= SS Southborough =

Cargo steamer

History

United Kingdom
- Name: SS Anerley (1910–1913); SS Southborough (1913–1918)
- Owner: Hazelwood Shipping Co. Ltd. (1913–1918)
- Builder: Sunderland Shipbuilding Company, South Dock, Sunderland, England
- Completed: 1910
- Stricken: 16 July 1918 (107 years ago)
- Fate: Sunk by a torpedo from UB-110 of the Imperial German Navy

General characteristics
- Tonnage: 3,709 tons
- Length: 105.6 metres (346 ft)
- Propulsion: Single screw, Held triple expansion three cylinder engine

SS Southborough was a 3,709 ton British cargo screw steamer that was sunk on 16 July 1918 by a torpedo from a submarine of the Imperial German Navy. She was built by the Sunderland Shipbuilding Co. Ltd. in 1910 and was named Anerley. She was renamed to Southborough when bought in 1913 by the Hazelwood Shipping Co. Ltd.

While in service, Southborough was used for carrying coal and steel rails from Newcastle in England to Port Pirie in Australia, returning with iron ore. Her last visit to Australia was in January 1918, carrying a cargo of wheat from the Port of Fremantle to Great Britain.

== Fate ==
Southborough was sunk on 16 July 1918 by a torpedo fired by submarine UB-110 of the Imperial German Navy under the command of Werner Fürbringer, 5 nautical miles (5.8 mi; 9.3 km) off the coast of Scarborough, North Yorkshire, England. She was en route to the River Tees in England from La Goulette in Tunisia with a cargo of iron ore, before being struck by the torpedo on the starboard side of the forward bunker at 1:43 PM. After being hit, it sank within a minute. Thirty of the 38 members of crew died, including the master. The eight survivors were picked up by an escort vehicle and landed at Middlesborough.

UB-110 was sunk three days later by the HMS Garry in the River Tees area, and was towed to Newcastle for inspection. Southborough was towed to Whitby in North Yorkshire and scrapped.
