= Ruth Elizabeth Becker =

Titanic survivor (1899–1990)

Ruth Becker
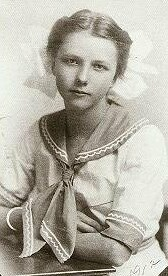
- Ruth Becker in 1912
- Born: October 28, 1899; Guntur, British India
- Died: July 6, 1990 (aged 90); Santa Barbara, California, United States
- Occupation: School teacher

Ruth Elizabeth Becker (October 28, 1899 – July 6, 1990) was a British-American passenger and one of the last survivors of the RMS Titanic disaster. Born in British India to American missionary parents, she boarded the Titanic in 1912 with her mother and siblings en route to the United States to seek medical care for her younger brother. During the sinking on April 15, 1912, Becker was separated from her family but survived.

Later in life, she became a school teacher and lived a quiet life. Only after retirement did she begin to speak publicly about her experience aboard the Titanic. After her death, her ashes were scattered at sea above the wreck site.

== Biography ==
=== Early life ===
Ruth Becker was born on October 28, 1899, in Guntur, British India. Her father, Allen Oliver Becker, was a Lutheran missionary, and her mother was Nellie E. Becker (née Baumgardner). She had a younger sister, Marion, born in 1907, and a younger brother, Richard, born in 1910. Another sibling, Luther, was born in Ohio in 1905 but died in India in 1907.

In 1912, Richard fell seriously ill at 1½ years old and needed medical treatment in the United States. While Allen Becker remained in India, Nellie Becker traveled to the U.S. with her children.

=== Aboard the Titanic ===
On the morning of April 10, 1912, in Southampton, England, Ruth, her mother, brother, and sister boarded the Titanic as second-class passengers. Ruth later recalled the ship, saying their cabin was, in her words, "very much like a large, new hotel room... with a bed for each of us and a wash‑basin for our toilette." She described the second-class dining room as luxurious, its chairs fixed to the floor, and the menu as well‑stocked, with seating served in two sittings at 6 pm and 7 pm. She also remembered pushing Richard in a pram supplied by the White Star Line.

The voyage proceeded smoothly until around midnight on April 14, 1912, when the ship struck an iceberg and began sinking. The Beckers reached the boat deck about an hour later. Ruth returned to their cabin to fetch blankets and was subsequently separated from her family. Richard and Marion, along with their mother, boarded Lifeboat 11, while Ruth was placed in Lifeboat 13 by an officer who carried her aboard. That boat was nearly crushed by Lifeboat 15 during lowering and stopped just 60 cm away. On board, she heard crew members playing what she believed to be the hymn Nearer, My God, to Thee.

In the lifeboat, Ruth distributed blankets to fellow passengers and comforted third-class passenger Thelma Thomas, promising to help find her baby who was on another boat. At dawn, survivors were rescued by the RMS Carpathia. On board, Ruth helped Thelma Thomas search for her child until she was reunited with her own mother. The Beckers were eventually reunited, and Mrs. Thomas found her son safe, having been rescued in Lifeboat 11.

=== Later life and career ===
The Carpathia arrived in New York on April 18, 1912. The Beckers disembarked amid crowds of reporters; Nellie Becker encouraged the public to ask Ruth directly about the events.

Ruth pursued her schooling in Ohio and Kansas, later marrying classmate Daniel Blanchard and having three children. The couple divorced after 20 years, and Ruth worked as a school teacher.

Her mother, Nellie, never fully recovered mentally from the tragedy, and became estranged from Marion. When Nellie died in 1961, she will leave everything to Richard and named Ruth as executor.

Richard Becker married twice and died in 1975.

Ruth rarely spoke about the Titanic until retirement, when she began attending Titanic Historical Society events.

=== Death ===
In March 1990, she took a cruise to Mexico—the first time she had sailed since the Titanic. She died of malnutrition as a complication of stomach ulcer and old age on July 6, 1990, in Santa Barbara, California, at age 90, and her ashes were scattered at sea over the wreck site of the Titanic, echoing the burial wishes of officer Joseph Boxhall and passenger Frank Goldsmith.

== Sources ==
- Ballard, Robert D. (1988). The Discovery of the Titanic. Glénat. ISBN 2-7234-0949-X.
- Brewster, Hugh; Coulter, Laurie (1999). Inside the Titanic. Glénat. ISBN 2-7234-2882-6.
