= Frank Goldsmith (Titanic survivor) =

English author and survivor of the Titanic

Frank John William Goldsmith
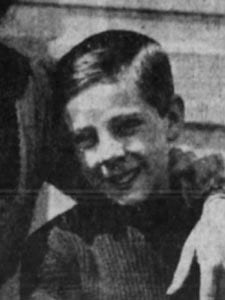
- Goldsmith in his childhood
- Born: 19 December 1902; Strood, Kent, England, United Kingdom
- Died: 27 January 1982 (aged 79); Orlando, Florida, United States
- Citizenship: United Kingdom; United States
- Spouse: Victoria Agnes née Lawrence
- Children: James Richard "Jim" Goldsmith; Charles Barton "Charlie" Goldsmith; Frank Goldsmith II
- Parents: Frank J. Goldsmith (Sr.); Emily Alice née Brown

Frank John William Goldsmith (19 December 1902 – 27 January 1982), was a young third-class passenger of the RMS Titanic and a survivor of the sinking in 1912. He later wrote a book about his experiences on the ship, published posthumously as Echoes in the Night: Memories of a Titanic Survivor (1991), which featured in the documentary, Titanic: The Complete Story (1994).

== Early life ==
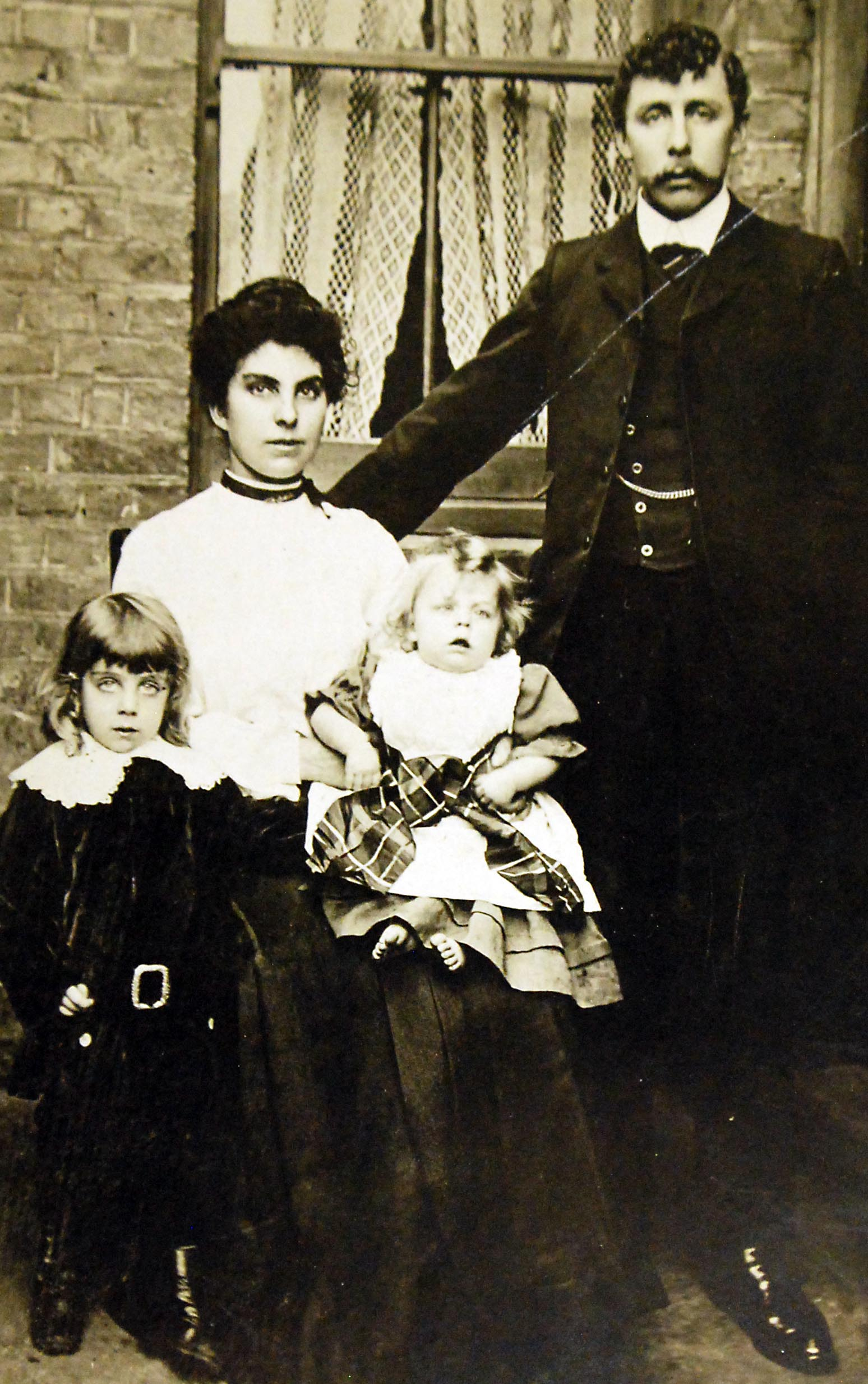
Frank John Goldsmith with his parents and younger brother, Bertie, around 1907

Frank John Goldsmith was born in Strood, Kent, England, the elder child of Frank and Emily (née Brown) Goldsmith. His father was originally from Tonbridge. His parents married sometime between October and December 1901, and Frank was born the following December. In early 1905, brother Albert John "Bertie" Goldsmith was born. Bertie died in late 1911 of diphtheria.

== RMS Titanic ==
Between 1908 and 1911, both of Emily's parents and six of her twelve brothers and sisters had immigrated to the United States, settling in Detroit, Michigan. In the wake of their youngest son's death, Frank's parents decided to immigrate and join Emily's relations in Detroit.

Goldsmith and his parents boarded the RMS Titanic in Southampton as third-class passengers, en route to New York City. His father, a tool maker, was bringing his bag of tools with him; these were stored in the ship's hold. Accompanying them were Thomas Theobald, Frank Sr.'s friend, and Alfred Rush, the son of a family friend. Rush commemorated his 17th birthday on 14 April on board the ship, celebrating his transformation from a boy to a man as he no longer had to wear short pants, and was now allowed to wear long trousers.

The nine year old Goldsmith spent his time on board the ship playing with a group of English speaking third-class boys who were about his age: Willie Coutts, Harold Goodwin, William Johnston, Albert and George Rice, and James and Walter van Billiard. They climbed the baggage cranes and wandered down to the boiler rooms to watch the stokers and firemen at work. Of these boys, only Goldsmith and Coutts survived the sinking.

When the ship struck the iceberg late in the evening of 14 April 1912, Frank Sr. woke Emily and Frank Jr. and, together with Theobald and Rush, they made their way to the forward end of the boat deck, where Collapsible C was being loaded. There was a ring of crewmen standing around it, letting only women and children pass through. Goldsmith wrote of the experience: "Mother and I then were permitted through the gateway, and the crewman in charge reached out to grasp the arm of Alfred Rush to pull him through because he must have felt that the young lad was not much older than me, and he was not very tall for his age, but Alfred had not been stalling. He jerked his arm out of the sailor's hand and with his head held high, said, and I quote, 'No! I'm staying here with the men.' At age 16, he died a hero." Theobald gave Emily his wedding ring, asking if she would give it to his wife if he did not survive. Goldsmith later recalled: "My dad reached down and patted me on the shoulder and said, 'So long, Frankie, I'll see you later.' He didn't and he may have known he wouldn't." Goldsmith Sr., Theobald, and Rush all died in the sinking; of the three, only Theobald's body was recovered.

The young Goldsmith and his mother were rescued by the RMS Carpathia in Collapsible C. As the Carpathia headed to New York City, in order to get Frank's mind off the sinking, Mrs. Goldsmith entrusted him into the care of a surviving Titanic fireman, Samuel Collins. While Mrs. Goldsmith was busy sewing clothes from blankets for women and children who had left the ship in only nightclothes, Frank accompanied Collins down to visit Carpathia's stokers. They offered to make him an honorary seaman by having him drink a mixture of water, vinegar, and a whole raw egg. He proudly swallowed it in one go, and from then on, considered himself as a member of the ship's crew. Goldsmith remembered fireman Collins telling him, "Don't cry, Frankie, your dad will probably be in New York before you are."

== Later life ==
After arriving in New York, Goldsmith and his mother were housed by the Salvation Army, which provided train fare to reach their relatives in Detroit. They moved to a home near the newly opened Navin Field, home of the Detroit Tigers. Every time the crowd cheered during a home run, the sound reminded him of the screams of the dying passengers and crew in the water just after the ship sank; as a result, he never took his children to baseball games.

Growing up, Goldsmith still held on to the hope of his father's survival. It took him months to understand that his father was really dead, and for years afterward, he used to tell himself, "I think another ship must have picked him up and one day he will come walking right through that door and say, 'Hello, Frankie.'"

Goldsmith married Victoria Agnes (née Lawrence) in 1926, and they had three sons: James, Charles, and Frank II.

During World War II, Goldsmith served as a civilian photographer for the U.S. Army Air Corps. After the war, he brought his family to Ashland, Ohio and later opened a photography supply store in nearby Mansfield.

Goldsmith's autobiography is entitled Echoes in the Night: Memories of a Titanic Survivor, and was published in 1981 by the Titanic Historical Society. Walter Lord wrote the foreword. Goldsmith's is the only book about the sinking written by a third-class passenger.

== Death ==
Goldsmith died at his home in 1982, at age 79. Several months after his death, on 15 April, the anniversary of the sinking, his ashes were scattered over the North Atlantic, above the place where the Titanic rests. Survivors Ruth Becker and Fourth Officer Joseph Boxhall also had their remains scattered there.

== In media ==
- Goldsmith wrote a book about his experiences on the ship, titled Echoes in the Night: Memories of a Titanic Survivor (1991)
- Goldsmith's memoir featured in the documentary, Titanic: The Complete Story (1994).
- A 1977 clip of Goldsmith describing his Titanic experience can be seen in the IMAX film Titanica (1995).
