= Sophie Ryder =

British sculptor (born 1963)

Sophie Ryder (born 1963) is a British sculptor, painter, printmaker and collagist known for her large wire structures. Ryder typically uses bronze, wet plaster embedded with found materials, sheet metal, marble, and stained glass.

== Biography ==
Sophie Ryder was born in London, England, in 1963. She studied combined arts at the Royal Academy of Arts from 1981 to 1984, focusing initially on painting. She changed her focus when the Royal Academy's director, Sir Hugh Casson, encouraged her skills development in sculpture.

=== Works ===
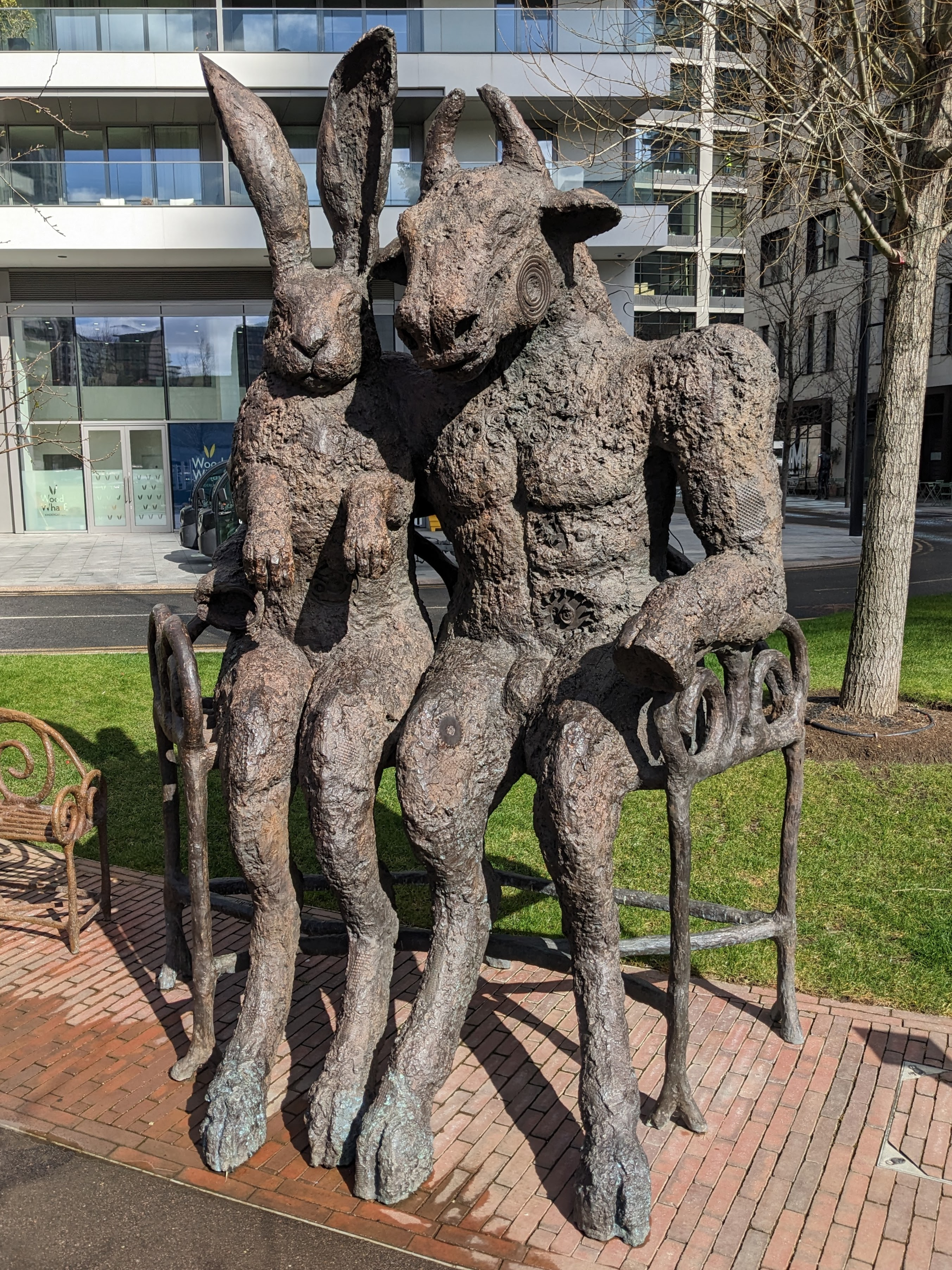
Sophie Ryder: Minotaur and Hare on Bench (1995) Canary Wharf, London

Ryder's sculptures sometimes represent mystical creatures, animals and hybrid beings created in assemblages of materials such as sawdust, wet plaster, obsolete machinery, toys, weld joins, wire 'pancakes', torn scraps of paper and charcoal sticks. Her iconography includes the character of the Lady Hare, which she sees as a counterpart to Ancient Greek mythology's Minotaur. Her most known piece is the Lady Hare, a hare with a female human body. The works have been commended for questioning human relationships to the natural and folkloric worlds while contemplating dualities of perception.

In 1994, a depiction of five minotaurs was excluded from an exhibition at Winchester Cathedral because the sculpture included genitalia as part of the anatomy.

Ryder has stated, "I don't sit and contemplate what it is I am trying to achieve. My head is full of ideas all the time. It is part of my life. I don't plan anything, it just comes." Similarly, when asked about the prominence of hares in her work, the artist stated, "it's the same as asking me why I make sculptures, and the answer is because I feel driven to. So it's difficult to always pin down reasons. My introduction to hares was when my lurcher dog would proudly bring hares home and drop them at my feet."

=== Solo shows ===
1987

- Edward Totah Gallery, London
- Courcoux & Courcoux Gallery, Salisbury
- Salisbury Cathedral, Salisbury

1988

- St. Paul's Gallery, Leeds
- Courcoux & Courcoux Gallery, Salisbury

1990

- Newport City Museum & Art Gallery, Newport, Gwent
- Courcoux & Courcoux Gallery, Salisbury
- Henley Festival, Henley-on-Thames
- Berkeley Square Gallery, Landon

1991

- Yorkshire Sculpture Park, Wakefield

1992

- Courcoux & Courcoux Gallery, Salisbury

1994

- Winchester Cathedral, Inner Close, Winchester
- Red House Museum & Gardens, Christchurch, Dorset
- The Allen Gallery (Garden), Aton, Hampshire

1995

- Berkeley Square Gallery, London

1996

- Belloc Lowndes Gallery, Chicago

1997

- O'Hara Gallery, New York
- Berkeley Square Gallery, London

1998

- Courcoux & Courcoux Gallery, Salisbury

1999

- Berkeley Square Gallery, London
- Victoria Art Gallery, Bath

2000

- Berkeley Square Gallery, London
- Odapark, Venray, The Netherlands
- Courcoux & Courcoux Gallery, Salisbury
- Buschlon Mowatt Galleries, Vancouver BC

2001

- Galerie de Bellefeuile, Montréal

2002

- Metropole Galleries, Folkestone, Kent, UK
- Courcoux & Courcoux Galley, Salisbury

2003

- Berkey Square Galley, London

2004

- Victoria Art Gallery, Bath
- Imago Galleries, Palm Desert, CA
- Courcoux & Courcoux Gallery, Salisbury
- Storey Galleries, Lancaster

2005

- Canary Wharf, London
- Solomon Gallery, Dublin

2006

- Atkinson Gallery, Millfield School
- Royal Hibernian Academy, Dublin

2007

- Imago Galleries, Palm Desert
- Frederick Meijer Gardens & Sculpture Park, Grand Rapids

2008

- Yorkshire Sculpture Park, Wakefield

2009

- Victoria Art Gallery, Bath

2010

- Aynhoe Park, Oxfordshire
- Chateau Saint Rosaline, Les Arc-sur Argens

2011

- Aynhoe Park, Oxfordshire

2012

- Cartwright Hall Aré Gallery, Bradford
- Villa D’Arte, Pietrasanta, Italy

2013

- Cola Landis Contemporary Art Gallery, Moreton in- Marsh Royal West Academy, Bristol
- Imago Galleries, Palm Desert

2014

- New Brewery Arts, Cirencester
- Courcoux & Courcoux Gallery, Stockbridge

2016

- Hignell Gallery, London
- Sophie Ryder Rising, Waterhouse and Dodd, Rising, New York

2017

- Hignell Gallery, London

2018

- Galerie de Bellefeuile, Montreal
