= Joseph Boxhall =

Fourth officer of RMS Titanic (1884–1967)

Commander Joseph Boxhall RD RNR
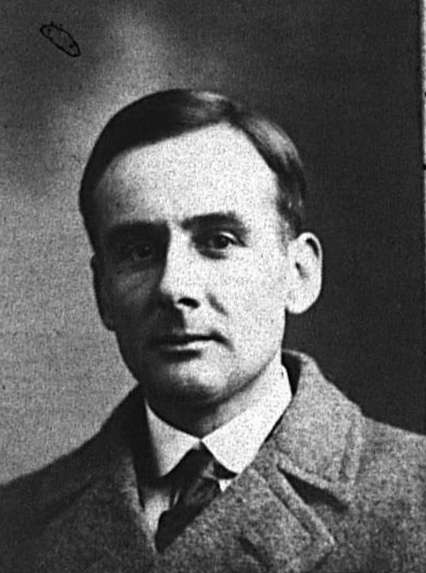
- Boxhall, c. 1919
- Born: 23 March 1884; Hull, East Riding of Yorkshire, England
- Died: 25 April 1967 (aged 83); Christchurch, Hampshire, England
- Resting place: North Atlantic Ocean; 41°46′N 50°14′W
- Occupations: Merchant seaman; Naval officer
- Known for: Fourth Officer on RMS Titanic
- Spouse: Marjory Bedells (m. 1919)
- Military career
- Allegiance: United Kingdom
- Branch: Royal Naval Reserve
- Rank: Commander
- Commands: HMTB 89
- Conflicts: World War I
- Awards: Victory Medal; 1914–15 Star; Reserve Decoration

Commander Joseph Groves Boxhall RD RNR (23 March 1884 – 25 April 1967) was a British merchant seaman and naval officer who was the fourth officer on the RMS Titanic. When the ship struck the iceberg, Boxhall was on watch and subsequently became the only on-watch officer that night to survive the sinking.

During the sinking, Boxhall was in charge of firing distress rockets in an attempt to signal a nearby ship, now known to be the SS Californian, and also made a second calculation of the Titanic's final position. He was ordered into Emergency Cutter No. 2 and, after the ship sank, was responsible for lighting green flares which helped attract the RMS Carpathia to the wrecksite, subsequently leading to a successful rescue of all the lifeboats. He subsequently took part in both the U.S. and U.K. inquiries.

Boxhall went on to serve in World War I with the Royal Naval Reserve. He rose to senior officer in the Merchant Navy, retiring from seafaring in 1940. Though he seldom spoke about Titanic, in retirement, he was persuaded to help out with the production of the film, A Night to Remember. He later gave an interview on the BBC on the 50th anniversary of the sinking. At the time of his death in 1967, Boxhall was the last living officer of Titanic.

== Early life ==
Boxhall was born in Hull in the East Riding of Yorkshire, England, the second child and only son of Miriam (née Groves) and Captain Joseph Boxhall. He had three sisters, two of whom, Violet and Mabel, survived into adulthood. The youngest, Enid, died a few months after birth.

He was born into an established seafaring tradition: His grandfather had been a mariner, his uncle was a Trinity House buoymaster and Board of Trade official, and his father was a respected master with the Wilson Line of Hull.

== Early maritime career ==
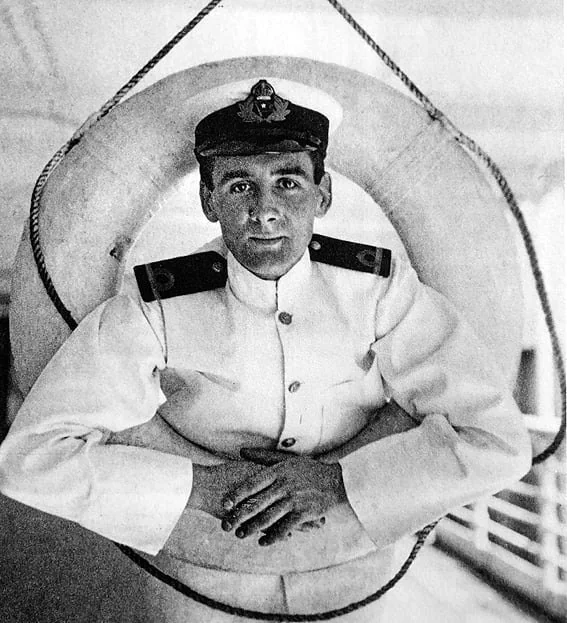
Boxhall during his time aboard RMS Oceanic, c. 1909

Boxhall followed in the footsteps of his family on 2 June 1899, when he joined his first ship, a barque of the William Thomas Line of Liverpool. Boxhall's apprenticeship lasted four years, during which time he travelled extensively. He then went to work with his father at Wilson Line, and obtained his Master's and Extra-Master's certifications in September 1907. Afterwards, he joined the White Star Line.

He joined the White Star Line November 1907, his first ship with the line being the RMS Celtic on which he served as sixth officer. He was then transferred to the RMS Oceanic in June 1908 where he served alongside Charles Lightoller, the only officer of the Titanic he knew before joining the ship.

In February 1910, he served aboard SS Runic on the Australian run before returning to the New York route aboard the RMS Cedric and then sailing on the Canadian run aboard SS Megantic. From December 1911 to January 1912, he was on the New York route again, serving aboard the SS Arabic. He was subsequently transferred to the RMS Titanic, White Star's newest liner and the largest in the world, as Fourth Officer for the ship's maiden voyage; he was then 28 years old.

On 1 October 1911, he was made a probationary sub-lieutenant in the Royal Naval Reserve, and was confirmed in the same rank on 5 March 1912.

== RMS Titanic ==
Like the ship's other junior officers, Boxhall reported to White Star's Liverpool offices at nine o'clock in the morning on 26 March 1912, and travelled to board the ship at Belfast the following day. Before the trials, Boxhall and Third Officer Herbert Pitman were tasked with inspecting the port lifeboats and their equipment. In Southampton on 10 April, Boxhall assisted with the ship's lifeboat drill.

The White Star Line operated a watchkeeping system whereby the three senior officers worked the same four-hour watches in every 12-hour period while the junior officers stood the traditional system of four hours on/four hours off with the rest of the Titanic's deck department. This was divided into two watches, designated Port and Starboard, and pairs of junior officers were assigned to each watch. Boxhall was assigned to the Starboard Watch with Sixth Officer James Moody. During delivery trip from Belfast to Southampton, and then again during departure from Southampton, Boxhall's departure position was on the navigating bridge, in charge of the engine telegraphs, as well as assisting the captain and the harbour pilot.

After the Titanic left Southampton, Boxhall – along with his fellow junior officers – settled into his regular duties; these included scheduled watches, aiding in navigation, and assisting passengers and crew when necessary.

=== Final watch and collision ===
On the evening of 14 April, Boxhall began his last watch at 8:00 PM, set to last until midnight, and spent "a great deal of time in the chartroom, evaluating previous navigational data and stellar fixes from Third Officer [Herbert] Pitman." He updated Titanic's position and reported the information to Captain Smith. He updated the ship's position once again at 10:00, incorrectly determining that any ice was to the north of the ship.

When Titanic collided with an iceberg at around 11:40 pm on 14 April, Boxhall was on duty but was not on the bridge at the time. (Note: At the two inquiries held into the sinking in 1912 he stated he was standing just outside the officers' quarters where his cabin was. However, in his 1962 BBC interview he stated that he was in his cabin, having gone there to have a cup of tea.) Hearing the lookout bell, he headed immediately to the bridge, arriving just after the impact. Captain Smith arrived almost immediately after Boxhall had, and began to assess the situation. Boxhall went off to inspect the damage and on his way down he came across passengers on the forward well-deck playing with ice.

Boxhall went as far as F-Deck and found no damage, but was later intercepted by the ship's carpenter who informed him that the ship was taking water, which was later confirmed by a mail clerk to Boxhall and Captain Smith. On the return trips up, he also noticed light ice scattered across the forward well deck. On his second trip down, Boxhall himself saw the damage in the mail hold as well as two of the postal clerks struggling to bring up mail bags.

=== Mystery ship and Titanic's position ===
Officer Boxhall sighted lights in the distance, likely the masthead light of the cargo steamer SS Californian, and attempted in vain to signal by using the morse lamp located atop Titanic's starboard bridge wing cab. After asking Captain Smith about Titanic's condition, he was told that she would sink in about an hour. After informing Smith that his position may be in error, Boxhall charted Titanic's position so that a distress signal could be sent out, incorrectly finding it as 41° 46' N, 50° 14' W, though it was more accurate than the Captain's initial position. (Note: This miscalculation in position was possibly due to a previous error made in calculations, not uncommon in those days, which is likely why even Captain Smith's initial calculations were incorrect.)

After giving the updated position to the wireless room, Boxhall began to fire distress rockets from the starboard bridge wing in an attempt to signal to the distant ship. The rockets were designed to be fired about 600 to 800 feet into the air and detonated with a loud report which Fifth Officer Harold Lowe, working at Lifeboat No. 1, described as "deafening." After Quartermaster George Rowe called the bridge from the stern, Boxhall ordered him to bring the remaining rockets from the stern to the bridge. Rowe and Boxhall subsequently fired a total of eight rockets, though that task also proved fruitless as the ship did not indicate they had seen them.

=== Lifeboat No. 2 and Carpathia ===
Boxhall was ordered into lifeboat No. 2 by Captain Smith, which was lowered from the port side at 1:45 am with 18 people aboard out of a possible 40. Boxhall was ordered to pull towards the starboard aft gangway doors, which he attempted to do but eventually the lifeboat rowed away from the ship for fear of being pulled down by suction. Boxhall later stated that he did not actually see Titanic founder, as her lights had gone out and his lifeboat was about 3/4 nautical mile (1.5 kilometres) distant.

Boxhall spotted the RMS Carpathia on the horizon around 4:00 am and guided her towards Titanic's lifeboats with green flares he had placed into the boat just before getting into it himself. As the lifeboat pulled alongside Carpathia, a passenger in the boat named Mahala Douglas, whom Boxhall had placed in charge of the tiller, called out "The Titanic has gone down with everyone aboard!" Boxhall quickly replied with "Shut up!" He later apologised for his outburst, and Douglas agreed that it was acceptable, given the circumstances they had just endured and their current conditions.

Once aboard the ship, Boxhall was taken to Captain Arthur Rostron who asked him, "The Titanic has gone down?" According to eyewitnesses, Boxhall's voice broke as he responded with, "Yes. She went down at about two-thirty." He subsequently informed Rostron the other lifeboats were nearby and assisted Carpathia's crew as they came up to the rescue ship one by one.

=== Inquiries ===
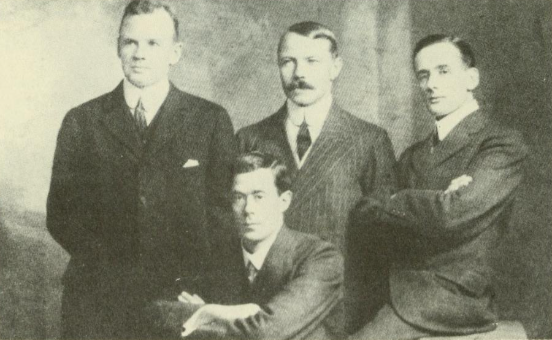
Titanic's four surviving officers. Standing, left to right: Charles Lightoller, Herbert Pitman, and Boxhall. Sitting: Harold Lowe

After arriving in New York on April 18, Boxhall, along with his fellow surviving officers, were served with subpoenas to testify at the American inquiry into the sinking. Initially, he testified on Day 3 of the hearings and was noted to be unwell. He had complained prior to the testimony of suffering from chest pains. Soon after, he was examined by a doctor who diagnosed him with pleurisy due to exposure whilst in the lifeboats. He would testify again about a week later. He and his fellow surviving officers were allowed to leave New York on the RMS Adriatic on 2 May.

After returning to England, Boxhall bore witness again, this time at the British inquiry. Much of his testimony concerned details of the lifeboat lowerings and Titanic's navigation, including the ice warnings, a number of which Boxhall marked down. Boxhall was also the first person to testify that he saw another vessel in proximity while Titanic sank.

== Later career and retirement ==
Following the sinking of Titanic, Boxhall briefly served as Fourth Officer on White Star's RMS Adriatic and then as Third Officer of the SS Persic. In November 1912, Boxhall received a promotion to senior officer, becoming Second Officer aboard the SS Irishman of the Dominion Line, on the Australian route. In June 1913, he appeared as a witness in the case of Ryan v. The Oceanic Steam Navigation Company.

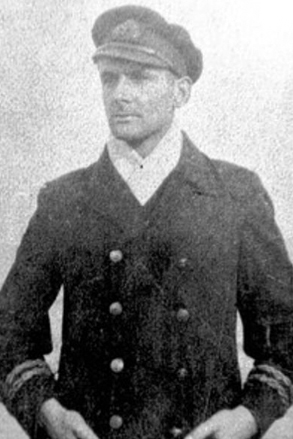
Lieutenant Boxhall during the First World War; photo taken during his time aboard a torpedo boat

He was promoted to lieutenant in the Royal Naval Reserve on 27 May 1915. During the First World War, he was commissioned to serve for one year aboard HMS Commonwealth before being dispatched to Gibraltar, where he commanded a torpedo boat, HMTB 89.

Boxhall returned to White Star following the war in May 1919. On 27 May 1923, he was promoted to lieutenant-commander in the RNR. On 30 June 1926, he signed on as second officer on board RMS Olympic, the older sister ship of Titanic. After the White Star–Cunard merger in 1933, he served in senior capacity as First and later Chief Officer of the RMS Aquitania, although he was never made a captain in the merchant marine. He also served as First Officer on RMS Berengaria and as Chief Officer on RMS Scythia.

After 41 years at sea, Boxhall retired in 1940. His RNR records describe him as working as a clerk in the Lymington Borough Council, in Lymington, Hampshire where he resided later in his career. His final listing is dated 20 May 1944 and 23 May 1944 where he is listed as being employed as "Marine Superdt" by the U.S. Army.

=== A Night to Remember ===
Boxhall was a generally taciturn and quiet man, usually reluctant to speak about his experiences on Titanic. However, in 1957, he acted as a technical advisor to William MacQuitty for the film adaptation of Walter Lord's historical account, A Night to Remember. It took the persuasion of an old friend, Captain Harry Grattidge, and from his family to get him to agree with the project.

Boxhall visited the set three times and was photographed with the film cast and crew. He later to attend the film's worldwide premiere in Odeon Leicester Square alongside Third Officer Herbert Pitman.

During a talk given at the Christchurch Red House Museum in May 1959, Boxhall remarked that he was "not too displeased" with the result, saying, "I've a great admiration for those film chaps who had to endure each shot being taken three times over in cold October whilst floundering about in Ruislip Reservoir."

Between April 1961 and July 1962, Boxhall exchanged letters with Joseph Carvalho, one of the founders of Titanic Historical Society. In them he implies that he and his wife are living in reduced financial circumstances due to "rapidly diminishing capital." He also notes he suffered from seasickness.

In 1962, for the 50th anniversary of the sinking, Boxhall gave an interview on the BBC regarding the disaster.

== Personal life ==
In the early 1910s, Boxhall was courting an Australian woman who eventually cut off their relationship. After the First World War, he married Marjory Bedells, the daughter of a Yorkshire industrialist. By all accounts, the marriage was a happy one. The couple had no children.

His health deteriorated rapidly in the 1960s, and he was eventually hospitalised. The last surviving deck officer of Titanic, Boxhall died of cerebral thrombosis on 25 April 1967 at the age of 83. His body was cremated and according to his last wishes, his ashes were scattered to sea at 41°46N 50°14W—the position he had calculated as Titanic's final resting place over 50 years earlier.

== Recognition ==
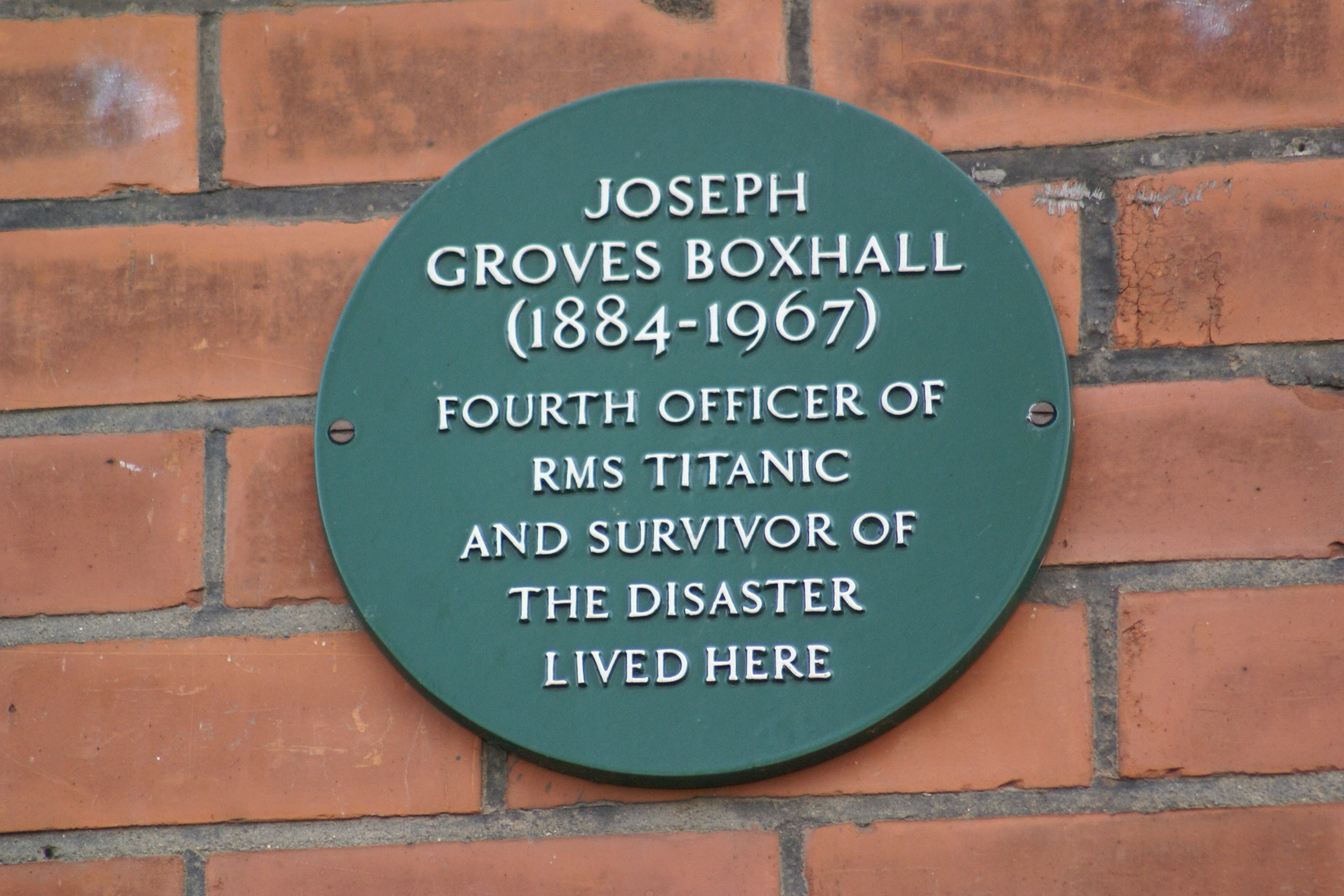
A green plaque on Boxhall's former home in Kingston upon Hull, Yorkshire

Boxhall is commemorated with a green plaque located at his former home at The Avenues, Kingston upon Hull.

He has been portrayed on screen several times:

- Jack Watling – A Night to Remember (1958)
- Warren Clarke – S.O.S. Titanic (1979)
- Gerard Plunkett – Titanic (1996); Boxhall's role is merged with that of Sixth Officer James Moody and he is inaccurately portrayed as dying in the sinking.
- Simon Crane – Titanic (1997)
- Cian Barry – Titanic (2012)
- Ethan McHale – Titanic Sinks Tonight (2025)
