= Charles Lightoller =

British mariner and officer (1874–1952)

Commander Charles Lightoller DSC & Bar RD RNR
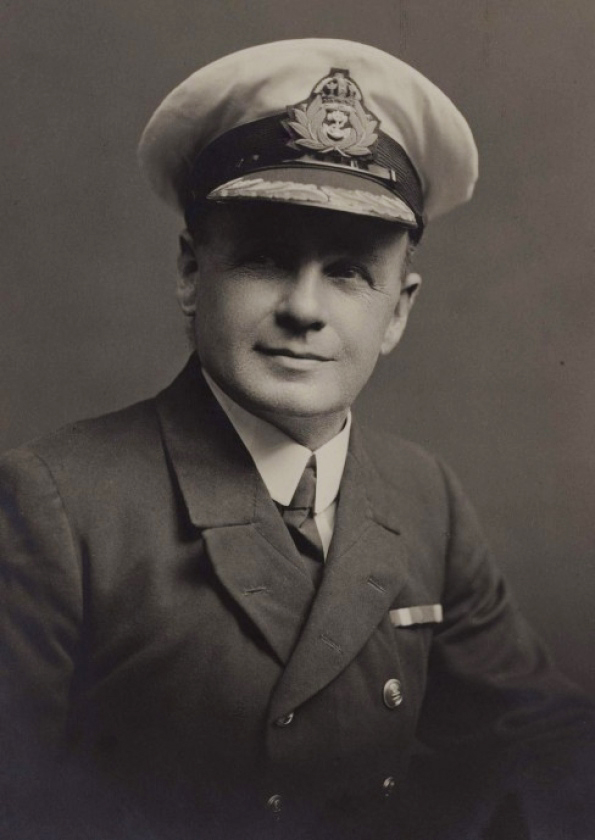
- Lightoller in 1920, Ellis Island Records
- Born: 30 March 1874; Chorley, Lancashire, England
- Died: 8 December 1952 (aged 78); Richmond, London, England
- Other name: Lights
- Occupations: Merchant mariner; Naval officer
- Spouse: Iowa Sylvania Zillah Hawley-Wilson (m. 1903)
- Children: 5
- Relatives: Louise Patten (granddaughter)
- Military career
- Allegiance: United Kingdom
- Branch: Royal Naval Reserve
- Rank: Commander
- Commands: HMTB 117; HMS Falcon; HMS Garry
- Conflicts: World War I
- Awards: Distinguished Service Cross & Bar; Reserve Decoration

Commander Charles Herbert Lightoller DSC & Bar RD RNR (30 March 1874 – 8 December 1952) was a British merchant mariner and naval officer who was the second officer on board the ocean liner RMS Titanic during its ill-fated maiden voyage, and was the most senior crewmember to survive the disaster.

During the sinking, and as the officer in charge of loading passengers into lifeboats on the port side, Lightoller strictly enforced the "women and children only" protocol, allowing only female passengers and children onto boats and turning away male passengers and female crewmembers. Lightoller went down with the ship and survived the night balancing on Collapsible B with several others.

Lightoller served as a commanding officer in the Royal Navy during World War I and he was twice decorated for gallantry. During World War II, in retirement, he voluntarily provided his personal yacht, the Sundowner, and sailed her as one of the "little ships" in the Dunkirk evacuation.

== Early life ==
Lightoller was born at Yarrow House in Chorley, Lancashire, on 30 March 1874, into a family that had operated cotton-spinning mills in Lancashire since the late 18th century. His mother, Sarah Jane Lightoller (née Widdows), died of scarlet fever shortly after giving birth to him. Two of his older siblings, Richard Ashton and Caroline Mary Lightoller, both also died of scarlet fever in early childhood.

His father, Frederick James Lightoller, was a captain in the British Army at the time of his first marriage. He remarried in 1876 to Margaret Barton, who died childless after five years of marriage. After being widowed again, Frederick allegedly had an affair with the family maid Joyce Gladwin, with whom he fathered a daughter, Janet, in 1883. In 1885, he emigrated, along with his eldest daughter Jane, to New Zealand when Charles was 10, leaving him in the care of extended family. There he married Joyce in Auckland, and died in 1913.

Though better known by his first name, Lightoller preferred to be called by his middle name "Herbert".

== Early maritime career ==
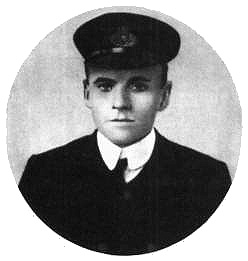
Lightoller as a merchant marine officer, c. 1894

At age 13, not wanting to end up with a factory job, Charles began a four-year apprenticeship on board the barque Primrose Hill. On his second voyage, he set sail with the crew of the Holt Hill. During a storm in the South Atlantic, the ship was forced to put in at Rio de Janeiro. Repairs were made in the midst of a smallpox epidemic and a revolution. Another storm, on 13 November 1889 in the Indian Ocean, caused the ship to run aground on an uninhabited four-and-a-half-square-mile island now called Île Saint-Paul. They were rescued by the Coorong and taken to Adelaide, Australia. Lightoller joined the crew of the clipper ship Duke of Abercorn for his return to England.

Lightoller returned to the Primrose Hill for his third voyage. They arrived in Calcutta, India, where he passed his second mate's certificate. The cargo of coal caught fire while he was serving as third mate on board the windjammer Knight of St. Michael, and for his successful efforts in fighting the fire and saving the ship, Lightoller was promoted to second mate.

In 1895, at age 21 and a veteran of the dangers at sea, he obtained his mate's ticket and left sailing ships for steamships. After three years of service in Elder Dempster's African Royal Mail Service on the West African coast, he nearly died from a heavy bout of malaria.

Lightoller went to the Yukon in 1898 to prospect for gold in the Klondike Gold Rush. Failing at this, he then became a cowboy in Alberta, Canada. To return home, he became a hobo, riding the rails back across Canada. He earned his passage back to England by working as a cattle wrangler on a cattle boat and arrived home penniless in 1899. Soon after, he returned to sea.

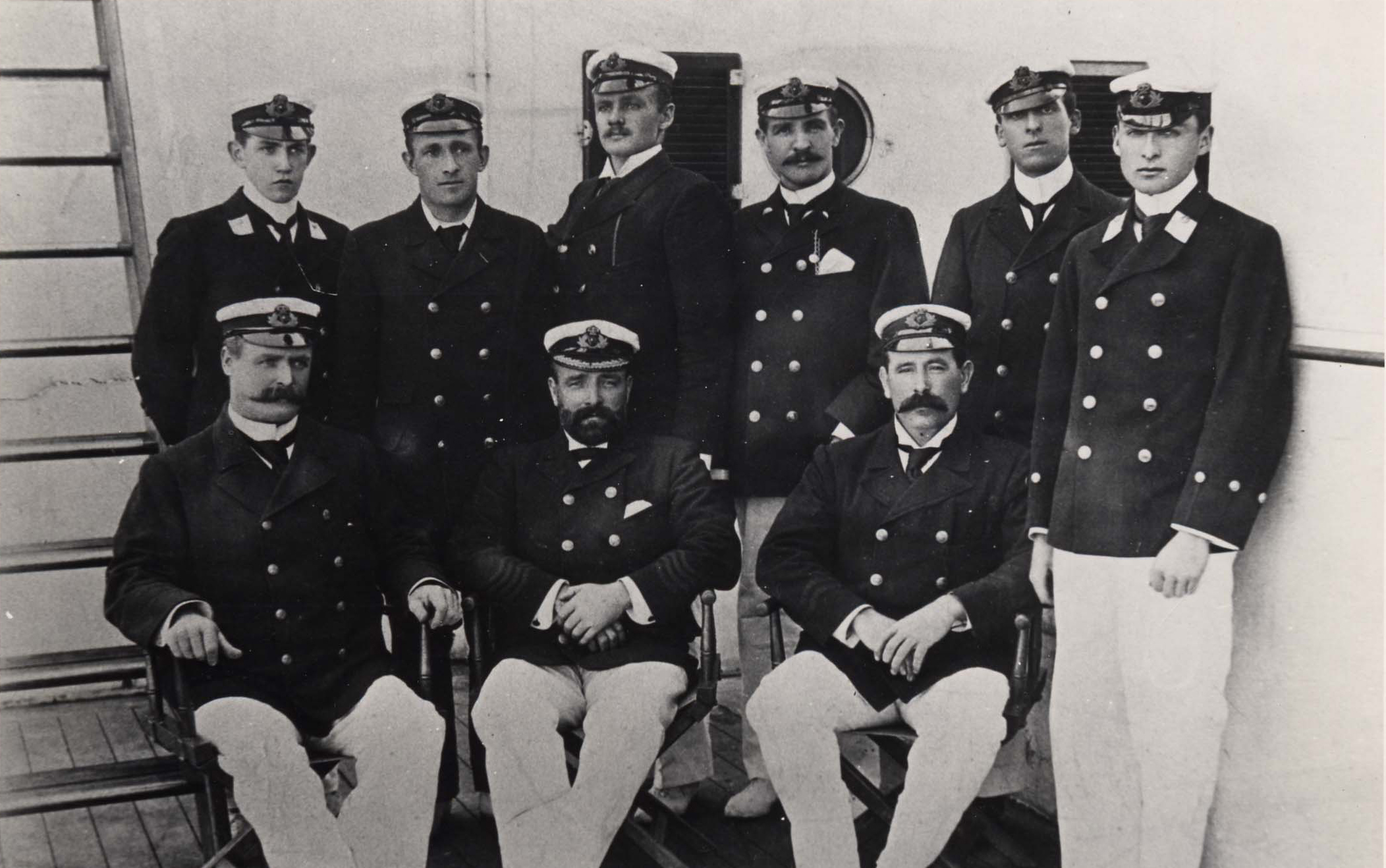
Lightoller (second from right) whilst serving on the SS Medic under Captain J B Ranson (seated centre), circa 1900. On his left is William Murdoch, his future shipmate aboard Titanic

While on the SS Medic, on a voyage from Britain to South Africa and Australia in October 1900, Lightoller was reprimanded for a prank he and some shipmates played on the citizens of Sydney at Fort Denison in Sydney Harbour. After the Medic dropped anchor in Neutral Bay, the group rowed to the fort where hoisted a makeshift Boer flag on the lightning conductor and fired a harmless wad of cotton waste from one of the 8-inch cannons, in an attempt to fool locals into believing a Boer raiding party was attacking Sydney. The blast shattered a few of the fort's windows but caused no other damage. Lightoller was never apprehended but confessed to his company's superiors and related the whole story in an autobiography.

In 1903 he found himself in Sydney again, having been transferred to the SS Suevic—possibly as punishment for another indiscretion. During the voyage, he met Sylvia Hawley-Wilson, a returning Australian whom he married in St James' Church, Sydney and took back to England on the return passage.

He later joined the RMS Majestic under the command of Captain Edward J. Smith in the Atlantic. From there, he was promoted to third officer on the RMS Oceanic, the flagship of the White Star Line. He returned to the Majestic as first mate and then transferred back to the Oceanic in the same position. In March 1911, while serving as first officer on the Oceanic, the ship's foremast was struck by lightning in a gale; Lightoller was standing on the bridge at the time, and narrowly avoided being seriously injured by falling splinters. While on the ship, with the bridge decking wet and the ship rolling, he liked to amuse himself "by trying to slide from one side of the bridge to the other, without touching anything".

== Titanic ==
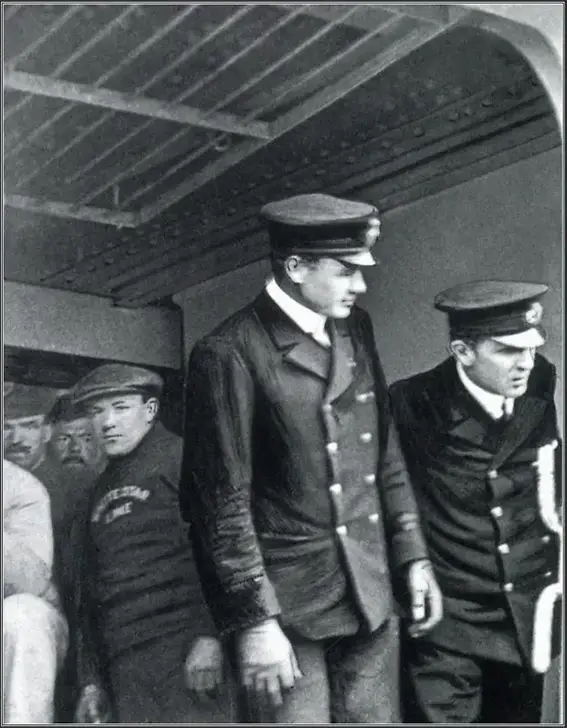
Second Officer Lightoller (center) and First Officer William Murdoch (right) closing the Titanic gangway before departure from Queenstown, Ireland, 11 April 1912

On 20 March 1912, Lightoller boarded the RMS Titanic in Belfast, as first officer for the sea trials. Lightoller would later state, "I was thoroughly familiar with pretty well every type of ship afloat, from a battleship and a barge, but it took me fourteen days before I could with confidence find my way from one part of that ship to another by the shortest route." Captain Smith gave the post of chief officer to Henry Wilde of the Olympic, demoting the original appointee William Murdoch to first officer and Lightoller to second officer. The original second officer, David Blair, was excluded from the voyage altogether, while the roster of junior officers remained unchanged. When the ship departed Southampton, Lightoller was at his departure station in the crow's nest.

At sea, Lightoller had the 6:00–10:00 watch every morning and night. On 14 April 1912, Lightoller and some of the other officers also discussed the subject of the ship's top speed; they were "interested" in seeing what the ship could do. Murdoch had the 10:00 a.m. to 2:00 p.m. watch on the bridge. However, the officers' lunch was served at 12:30. Lightoller returned to the bridge at that time to relieve Murdoch and let him grab a quick bite to eat. Captain Smith came on to the bridge, and gave him an ice warning message; this was the first that Lightoller recalled hearing anything about icebergs ahead of the ship. When Murdoch returned from his lunch, Lightoller mentioned that Captain Smith had given him a message regarding ice. Murdoch showed no overt surprise, but Lightoller was under the impression that the subject was new to the First Officer, just as it had been to him. Lightoller headed off to get lunch for himself.

At 6:00, Lightoller became officer of the watch, relieving Wilde. Murdoch returned at 7:05 p.m., and took the watch for a half-hour so that Lightoller could have his own dinner. Lightoller returned from dinner to resume his watch. Murdoch remarked to him that the temperature had dropped another four degrees. Murdoch departed the bridge. At 9:00, Captain Smith conferred with Lightoller on the bridge, and they agreed that they should be able to see an iceberg with plenty of time to avoid it. Smith left the bridge, saying, "If it becomes at all doubtful, let me know...". Lightoller asked Moody to use the telephone to call up the lookouts in the Crow's Nest; he wanted to have them "keep a sharp lookout for ice, particularly small ice and growlers", and to "pass that word on until daylight", as each successive shift took its turn on duty. Moody picked up the phone to the Nest in the wheelhouse and Lightoller overheard him say, "Keep a sharp look out for ice, particularly small ice.", before hanging up. Lightoller noted that Moody's order differed somewhat from the wording that he had specified, as Moody had not mentioned "growlers". He thought the detail was important enough to have Moody call the lookouts again, and to clarify that they should keep a sharp lookout for "small ice and growlers". Moody carried the order out, ringing the crow's nest a second time and conveying the order more precisely.

He then ordered the quartermaster, Robert Hichens, to check the ship's fresh water supply for signs of freezing below the waterline, signs which, if present, would indicate the ship was entering dangerous ice. Lightoller commanded the last bridge watch prior to the ship's collision with the iceberg, after which Murdoch relieved him at 10:00 p.m.; Lightoller conveyed to Murdoch the ship's course and the ice field that they were approaching, and that they expected to be in the vicinity of the ice somewhere around 11:00. Lightoller wished Murdoch "joy of his Watch" and departed the bridge.

=== Collision and port-side evacuation ===
Lightoller was in bed and awake when he felt the collision. Although he felt it had something to do with ice, he continued to lay in his berth, then felt the engines stop. Wearing only his pyjamas, Lightoller hurried out on deck to investigate, and conferred with Pitman – who was awakened by it and came out of his own cabin – on what happened. He retired back to his cabin; deciding it would be better to remain where other officers knew where to find him if needed, he lay awake in his bunk until fourth officer Joseph Boxhall arrived and remarked, "You know we have struck an iceberg." Lightoller responded, "I know we have struck something." Boxhall told him that the mail room was flooding, and Lightoller found the information enough to move him to act. Lightoller did not conclude that the ship would actually founder. He pulled on trousers, and a navy-blue sweater over his pyjamas, and donned his officer's overcoat and cap.

When Lightoller emerged onto the boat deck, he found that the noise of escaping steam made it very difficult to communicate with anyone. During the evacuation, Lightoller took charge of lowering the lifeboats on the port side of the boat deck. He helped to fill several lifeboats with passengers and launched them. Lightoller interpreted Smith's order for "the evacuation of women and children" as essentially "women and children only", rather than "women and children first". As a result, Lightoller lowered lifeboats with empty seats if there were no women and children waiting to board, meaning to fill them to capacity once they had reached the water. Major Arthur Peuchen has the distinction of being the only adult male passenger whom Lightoller allowed into the boats on the port side evacuation (Peuchen assisted on board Lifeboat No. 6), due to his experience as a yachtsman and offer of assistance when there were few seamen available from the Titanic's own complement to help command one of the lowering lifeboats.

There were fears from some of the officers that the davits used for lowering the boats would not hold the weight if the boats were full and would fail. Likely due to this fear, Lightoller's plan was to fill the lifeboats from the waterline and sent 10 men to open the gangway doors in the ship's port so that passengers would have access. The men failed in this task and were never seen again. The boats filled under Lightoller's watch were mostly half-full then pulled away from the ship as soon as they reached the water, rendering the plan a failure. At least one boat is confirmed as wilfully ignoring officers' shouted orders to return.

While working at the port side lifeboats, Lightoller was asked by Wilde where the firearms were. Lightoller led him, Murdoch and Smith to Murdoch's cabin, where Lightoller had stowed them during his time as first officer, and brought out the box of revolvers. He said Wilde gave him a revolver, along with ammunition; Lightoller stuffed these into his pocket. When Lightoller helped at Collapsible D, he saw a group of men and hopped into the boat, drew his revolver and "encouraged them verbally" to get out. Lightoller later recalled that the gun was not even loaded. He then passed the duty of loading Lifeboat 2 over to Captain Smith who ordered Fourth Officer Boxhall into the boat. While initial accounts varied, it is now believed there were only 17 people aboard the lifeboat, out of a capacity of 40.

=== Collapsible B and rescue on Carpathia ===
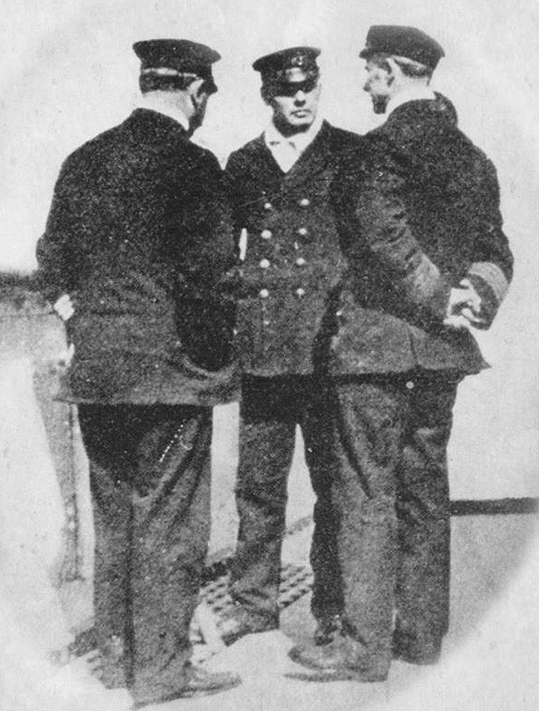
Lightoller (centre) after being rescued aboard RMS Carpathia, talking to Captain Arthur Rostron (right) and Chief Officer Thomas Hankinson

As the ship began its final plunge, Lightoller attempted to launch Collapsible B on the port side; the boat was one of the smaller Engelhardt lifeboats with canvas sides and was stowed atop the officers' quarters. The collapsible fell onto the deck upside down. Lightoller then crossed over to the starboard side of the roof, to see if there was anything further to be done there. A large wave rolled aft along the boat deck and engulfed many people. Seeing crowds of people run away from the rising water, Lightoller realized it would be futile heading aft and dived overboard from the roof of the officers' quarters. Lightoller described the shock of the water as being like "a thousand knives being driven into one's body".

Surfacing, Lightoller spotted the ship's crow's nest, now level with the water, and started to swim towards it as a place of safety before remembering that it was safer to stay away from the foundering vessel. Then, as water flooded down one of the forward ventilators, Lightoller was sucked under. He was pinned against the grating for some time by the pressure of the incoming water, until a blast of hot air from the depths of the ship erupted out of the ventilator and blew him to the surface. The suction pulled him down again against another grating, but he resurfaced. He then realized he could not swim properly because of the weight of the Webley revolver he was carrying in his coat pocket, so he swiftly discarded it. Following this, he saw Collapsible B floating upside down with several swimmers hanging on to it. He swam to it and held on to a rope at the front. Then the Titanic's Number 1 (forward) funnel broke free and hit the water, washing the collapsible further away from the sinking ship; it killed several people and closely missed Lightoller.

Lightoller climbed onto the boat and took charge, calming and organising the survivors (numbering around 30) on the overturned lifeboat. He led them in yelling in unison "Boat ahoy!", but with no success. During the night a swell arose, and Lightoller taught the men to shift their weight with the swells to prevent the craft from being swamped. As dawn broke and it became possible for those in other lifeboats to see them, Lightoller used his officer's whistle to attract the other lifeboats' attention; eventually lifeboats Nos. 4 and 12 rowed over and rescued the survivors of the overturned lifeboat and he took charge of both boats and their crew. Upon the Carpathia's arrival, Lightoller and the crew helped survivors from the lifeboats to the Carpathia; he was the last survivor to be taken aboard.

=== Titanic inquiries ===
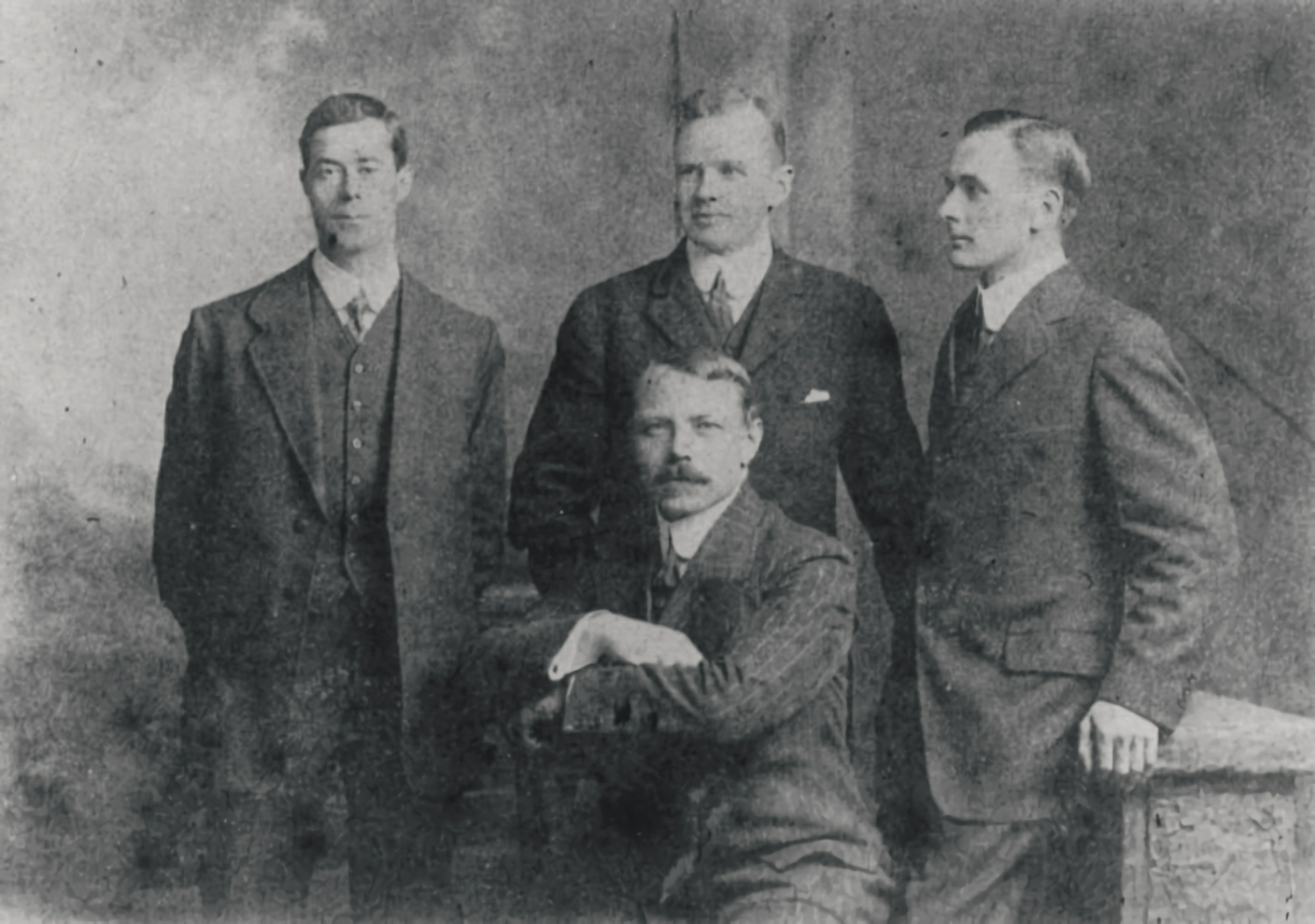
RMS Titanic's four surviving officers; clockwise from left: Fifth Officer Harold Lowe, Second Officer Lightoller, Fourth Officer Joseph Boxhall; Third Officer Herbert Pitman, seated

As the most senior surviving officer, Lightoller was a key witness at both the American and British inquiries, later saying he "felt more like a legal doormat than a mailboat officer" after the inquiries had finished.

In his autobiography, he described the American inquiry as a "farce" and he was indignant at some of the questions asked of him at the U.S. Senate inquiry, such as whether the falling funnel injured anyone when it fell down on the swimmers struggling in the water. Lightoller later said that the surviving officers were highly resentful of what they perceived to be poor treatment by the American authorities as well as invasive treatment by newspaper men. They were especially bemused that an inquiry into the sinking of a ship was being conducted by men with no knowledge of sailing, or experience at sea.

Lightoller took the British inquiry more seriously, describing it as "such a contrast to the dignity and decorum" in comparison to the more informal setting of the hastily convened U.S. inquiry. However, he would later note that, unlike in Washington, the crew had to be careful in their answers to avoid being pinned with the blame and potentially having their careers end. He noted the conflict of interest in the British Board of Trade (B.O.T.) holding the inquiry:

In Washington it was of little consequence, but in London it was very necessary to keep one's hand on the whitewash brush. Sharp questions that needed careful answers if one was to avoid a pitfall, carefully and subtly dug, leading to a pinning down of blame on to someone's luckless shoulders... A washing of dirty linen would help no one. The B.O.T. had passed that ship as in all respects fit for sea in every sense of the word, with sufficient margin of safety for everyone on board. Now the B.O.T. was holding an enquiry in to the loss of that ship – hence the whitewash brush... I think in the end the B.O.T. and the White Star Line won.

Lightoller blamed the accident on the seas being the calmest that night that he had ever seen in his life and on the floating icebergs giving no tell-tale early-warning signs of breaking white water at their bases. He mostly toed the company line during the inquiries and was noticeably careful in answering questions. Years later, however, in a recounting he gave of the night's events on a 1936 BBC I Was There programme, he reversed his defences towards his ex-employers, the White Star Line.

After the sinking, Lightoller published a testimony in the Christian Science Journal crediting his faith in a divine power for his survival, concluding: "with God all things are possible". In June 1913, he appeared as a witness in the case of Ryan v. The Oceanic Steam Navigation Company.

== First World War ==
Lightoller returned to duty with White Star Line, serving as a mate on RMS Oceanic. He received a promotion from sub-lieutenant to lieutenant in the Royal Naval Reserve in May 1913. At the outbreak of the First World War, as an officer in the RNR, he was called up for duty with the Royal Navy, first serving as a lieutenant on Oceanic, which had been converted to an armed merchant cruiser (HMS Oceanic). He served on this ship as the ship's First Officer until it ran aground and was wrecked on the notorious Shaalds of Foula on 8 September 1914. He was the last man off the grounded ship, taking the navigation room's clock as a souvenir.

In 1915, he served as the first officer during the trials of another former passenger liner, RMS Campania, which had just been converted into an aircraft carrier. In late 1915, he was given his own command, the torpedo boat HMTB 117. Whilst captain of HMTB 117 he was awarded the Distinguished Service Cross for engaging Zeppelin L31 in a prolonged night battle. With the assistance of a lightship, Lightoller and his crew laid an ambush at the mouth of the Thames Estuary, waiting until L31 was directly above the HMTB. Lightoller opened fire on the "Zepp" with tracer rounds eventually hitting its tail and forcing the airship's withdrawal. This action resulted in his being appointed captain of HMS Falcon, a C-class torpedo boat destroyer and for the next two years Lightoller served with the Falcon on the Dover patrol, protecting the Dover straits and engaging German destroyers conducting night time raids.

Lightoller wrote that whilst in command of the Falcon, he kept the ship in a constant state of readiness; the ship's guns were loaded and cleared for action at all times. He expected his men to think and act for themselves in times of an emergency. Falcon was sunk on 1 April 1918 after a collision, in fog, with the trawler, John Fitzgerald, while both ships were acting as escorts to a convoy in the North Sea. Lightoller was quickly exonerated in a court martial for the loss of the ship and he was commended for remaining on board the ship along with his first officer until the majority of the crew had taken to the boats (apart from three officers who were left trapped in the stern and had to be rescued by a trawler). Lightoller was subsequently given command of the River-class destroyer HMS Garry.

On 10 June 1918, Lightoller was awarded the Reserve Decoration.

=== Sinking of UB-110 ===
On 19 June 1918, the German U-boat UB-110 was depth charged, rammed and sunk off the Yorkshire coast by Lightoller and the crew of Garry. In his 1933 memoirs, Kapitänleutnant Werner Fürbringer accused the Captain and crew of Garry of war crimes by opening fire on the unarmed survivors of UB-110 with revolvers and machine-guns. Fürbringer alleged that the shooting only ceased when the convoy the Garry had been escorting, which contained many neutral-flagged ships, arrived on the scene. Fürbringer later recalled, "As if by magic the British now let down some life boats into the water".

Lightoller does not mention opening fire in his own accounting of the naval engagement, but he admitted that he "refused to accept the hands up air" business, explaining, "In fact it was simply amazing that they should have had the infernal audacity to offer to surrender, in view of their ferocious and pitiless attacks on our merchant ships. Destroyer versus Destroyer, as in the Dover Patrol, was fair game and no favour. One could meet them and take them on as a decent antagonist. But towards the submarine men, one felt an utter disgust and loathing; they were nothing but an abomination, polluting the clean sea". Lightoller stated that he "left the rescue work to the others" as his own ship took serious damage in the ramming.

Geoffrey Brooks, who translated into English and edited Fürbringer's 1933 memoir for its 1999 publication by Pen & Sword Books, commented about the action:

Regarding the alleged British atrocity committed against survivors of UB-110, the normal procedure would have been to report the matter to the German legal military authorities at the earliest opportunity. Depositions would have been taken from all available witnesses. One can imagine how far it would have proceeded subsequently. It is not, and never has been, the practice of the British military authorities to try British service personnel for alleged war crimes against enemy belligerents in wartime, no matter how strong the evidence.

Lightoller was awarded a bar to his Distinguished Service Cross for sinking UB-110. Contradictory information exists about the numbers of UB-110's crew lost, with Lightoller claiming 15 survivors with 13 lost, while a German account claims 13 survivors with 21 lost, most in the post-battle events.

=== Subsequent wartime service ===
Lightoller was promoted to acting lieutenant commander in July 1918 and was placed on the retired list on 31 March 1919, with the rank of commander.

== Retirement ==
After the war, despite his loyal service to White Star Line and having faithfully defended his employers at Titanic inquiries, Lightoller soon found that opportunities for advancement within the line were no longer available and would later blame it on his association with the Titanic disaster. A disillusioned Lightoller resigned shortly thereafter, and retired from seafaring in 1920.

Afterwards, he began taking such odd jobs as an innkeeper, a chicken farmer, and later property speculator, at which he and his wife had some success. During the early 1930s, he wrote his autobiography, Titanic and Other Ships, which he dedicated to his "persistent wife, who made me do it". The book eventually became quite popular and began to sell well.

In a letter to Walter Lord, Lightoller's widow Sylvia later claimed the book was withdrawn when the Marconi Company threatened a lawsuit, owing to a comment by Lightoller regarding the Titanic disaster and the role of the Marconi operators, but no proof of this has been found. Lightoller did put most of the blame on Marconi operator Jack Phillips, claiming that he did not deliver the SS Mesaba ice warning which he alleged could have prevented the sinking, and Titanic junior wireless operator Harold Bride responded strongly to the allegation in a letter to a newspaper. It was also known that Phillips and Bride both delivered multiple ice warnings to the bridge and Captain Smith, as well as Lightoller himself, were well aware of ice in the region before the collision occurred.

In 1936, Lightoller gave a radio interview for the BBC, in which he described the Titanic disaster.

== Second World War ==
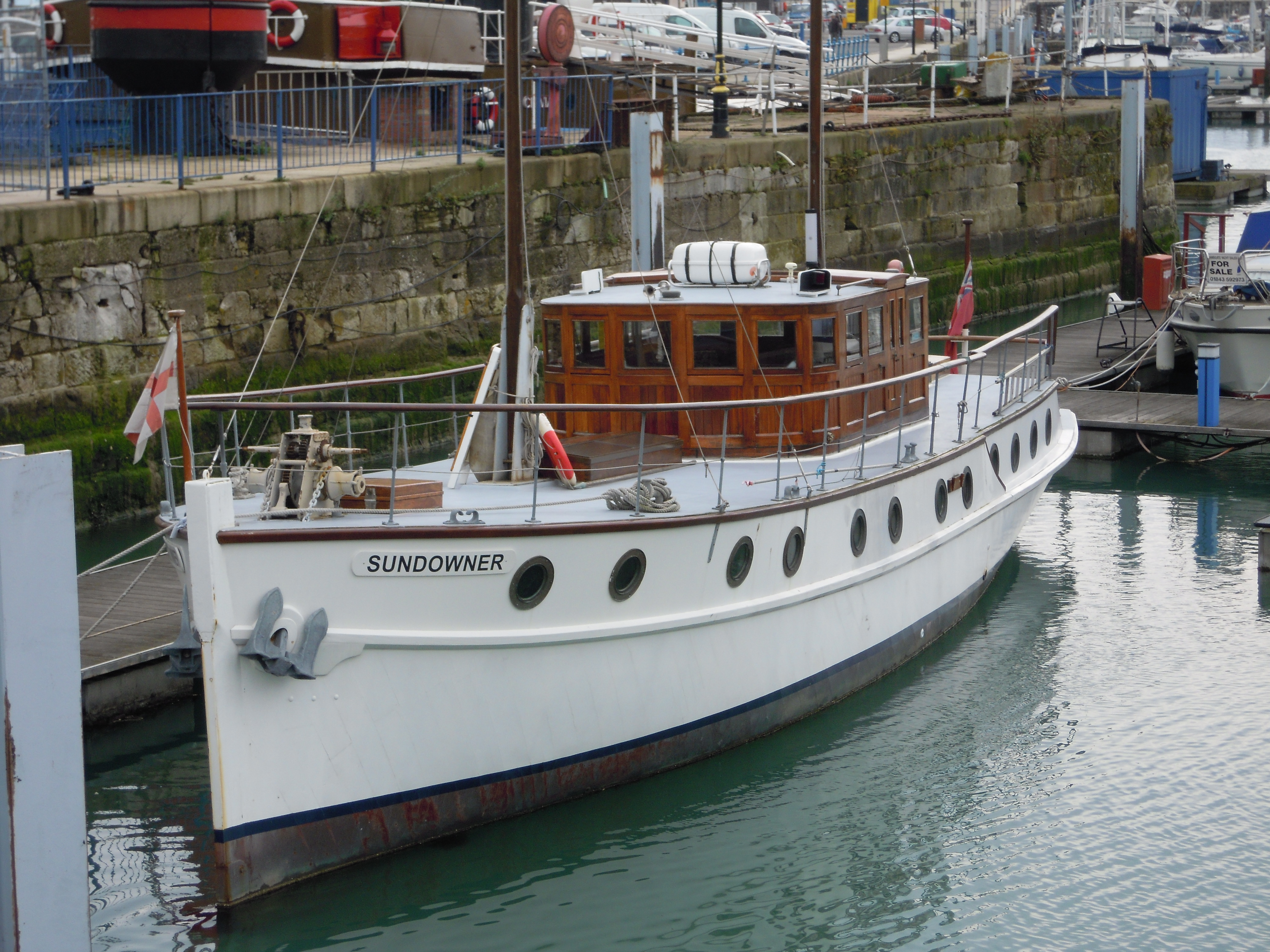
Lightoller's Sundowner, now preserved by Ramsgate Maritime Museum

The retired Lightoller did not turn his back on sailing altogether, as he eventually purchased a private motor yacht, Sundowner, in 1929. In early 1939, he was commissioned by the Admiralty to use Sundowner to tour the German coast to gather information and take photos of German naval installations. This was completed despite Lightoller nearly being caught out near the German naval base at Wilhelmshaven, which he avoided by pretending to be drunk when intercepted by a German naval vessel.

=== Dunkirk evacuation ===
In May 1940, Lightoller, together with his oldest son Roger and a young Sea Scout named Gerald Ashcroft, crossed the English Channel in Sundowner to assist in the Dunkirk evacuation. Rather than allow his motor yacht to be requisitioned by the Admiralty, he sailed the vessel to Dunkirk. In a boat licensed to carry 21 passengers, Lightoller and his crew repatriated 127 British servicemen. (Note: Sources vary slightly. The Association of Dunkirk Little Ships says, "Sundowner embarked 130 men." A member of Lightoller's crew says he "counted 129 troops aboard." In a radio interview, Lightoller says, "We tallied up 130." A commemorative plaque outside Lightoller's former home in Richmond says he "rescued 127 men." Stenson (2011) says, "Including the three-man crew and the five men rescued from the [sinking ship] Westerly she now had exactly 130 on board.") On the return journey, Lightoller evaded gunfire from enemy aircraft, using a technique described to him by his youngest son, Herbert, who had joined the RAF and been killed earlier in the war. Gerald Ashcroft later recalled "We attracted the attention of a Stuka dive bomber. Commander Lightoller stood up in the bow and I stood alongside the wheelhouse. Commander Lightoller kept his eye on the Stuka till the last second – then he sang out to me "Hard a port!" and I sang out to Roger and we turned very sharply. The bomb landed on our starboard side."

At the time of the evacuation, Lightoller's second son, Trevor, was a serving second lieutenant with the 3rd Division (Major-General Bernard Montgomery), which had retreated towards Dunkirk. Unknown to Lightoller senior, Trevor had already been evacuated 48 hours before Sundowner reached Dunkirk.

=== Subsequent wartime service ===
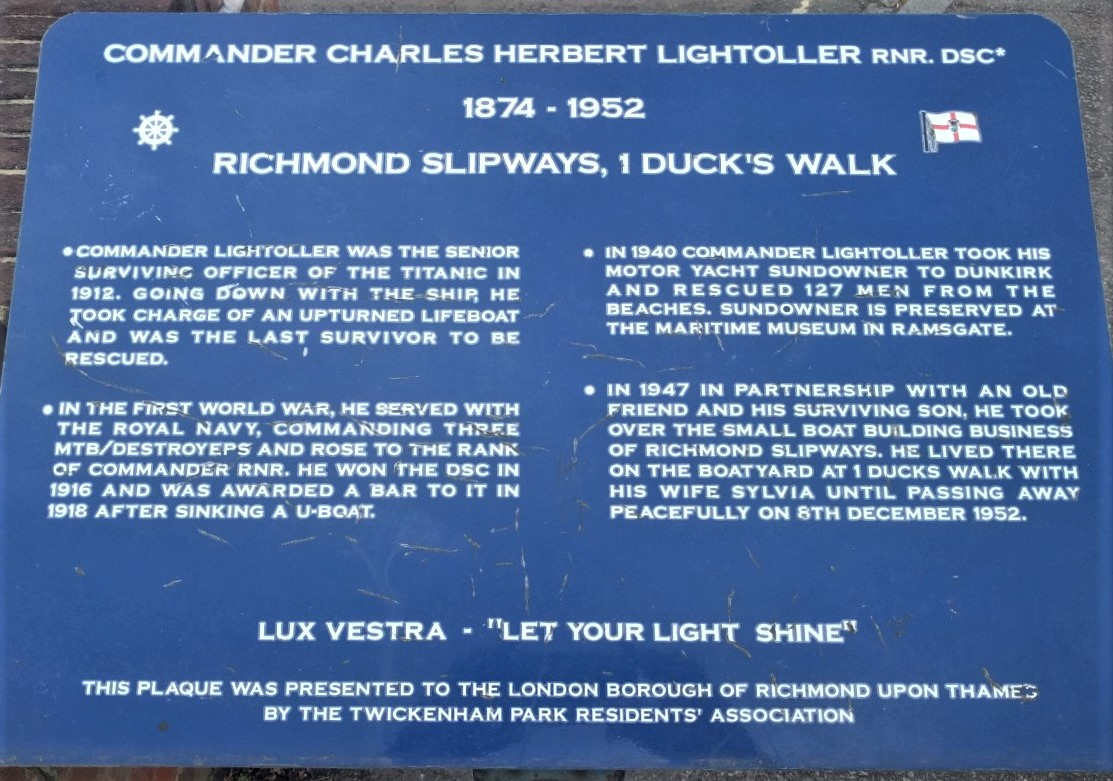
Information board in Twickenham near the Richmond Slipways where Lightoller lived and worked after 1947

Following Dunkirk, Lightoller continued to serve with the Small Vessels Pool until 1946. He was placed in command of a "Small Armed Vessel", patrolling the River Blackwater, Essex during the invasion scare (Operation Sea Lion) of 1940–41. He then ferried arms and ammunition for the Royal Army Service Corps until the end of the war. For these services Lightoller was mentioned in despatches in December 1944. After the Second World War, Lightoller managed a small boatyard in Twickenham, West London, called Richmond Slipways, which built motor launches for the river police.

== Family ==
While serving on the Majestic, Lightoller met Australian Iowa Sylvania Zillah Hawley-Wilson, known as "Sylvia", on her way home to Sydney after a stay in England. On the return voyage, she accompanied Lightoller as his bride.

The couple had five children: Frederic Roger, Richard Trevor, Sylvia Mavis, Claire Doreen, and Herbert Brian. Their youngest son Brian, a Royal Air Force (RAF) pilot, was killed in action on 4 September 1939 in a bombing raid over Wilhelmshaven, Germany, on the first night of Britain's entry into the Second World War. Their eldest son, Roger, served in the Royal Navy and was killed in March 1945 during the Granville raid whilst commanding a Motor Torpedo Boat. Trevor joined the army and gained the rank of lieutenant-colonel, serving under General Bernard Montgomery's command for the duration of the war. Mavis served in the First Aid Nursing Yeomanry, and Doreen in the Political Intelligence Unit. His grandson, A. T. Lightoller, served in the Royal Navy, commanding the submarine HMS Rorqual in the early 1970s.

== Death ==
Lightoller died of chronic heart disease on 8 December 1952, at the age of 78, during London's Great Smog of 1952. His body was cremated, and his ashes were scattered at the Commonwealth "Garden of Remembrance" at Mortlake Crematorium in Richmond, Surrey.

== Portrayals ==
Lightoller has been portrayed by:

- Herbert Tiede (1943) – Titanic (German film)
- Edmund Purdom (1953) – Titanic (American film)
- Neil North (1956) – A Night to Remember (Kraft Television Theatre)
- Kenneth More (1958) – A Night to Remember (British film)
- Malcolm Stoddard (1979) – S.O.S. Titanic (TV film)
- Sigmar Solbach (1984) Titanic – Nachspiel einer Katastrophe (German TV film)
- Kevin McNulty (1996) – Titanic (TV miniseries)
- John Bolton (1997) – Titanic (Broadway musical)
- Jonathan Phillips (1997) – Titanic (Film)
- Jesse Baker (2003) – Ghosts of the Abyss (Documentary)
- Johnny Eveson (2012) – Saving the Titanic (PBS TV miniseries)
- Steven Waddington (2012) – Titanic (TV miniseries)
- In the film Dunkirk (2017), Mark Rylance's character "Mr. Dawson", was inspired by Lightoller.
- Brendan Griffin (2024) – Unsinkable (Film)
- Adam Rhys-Charles (2025) – Titanic Sinks Tonight (BBC 4-part drama-documentary series)
