= SM UB-110 =

1917 German Type UB III U-boat

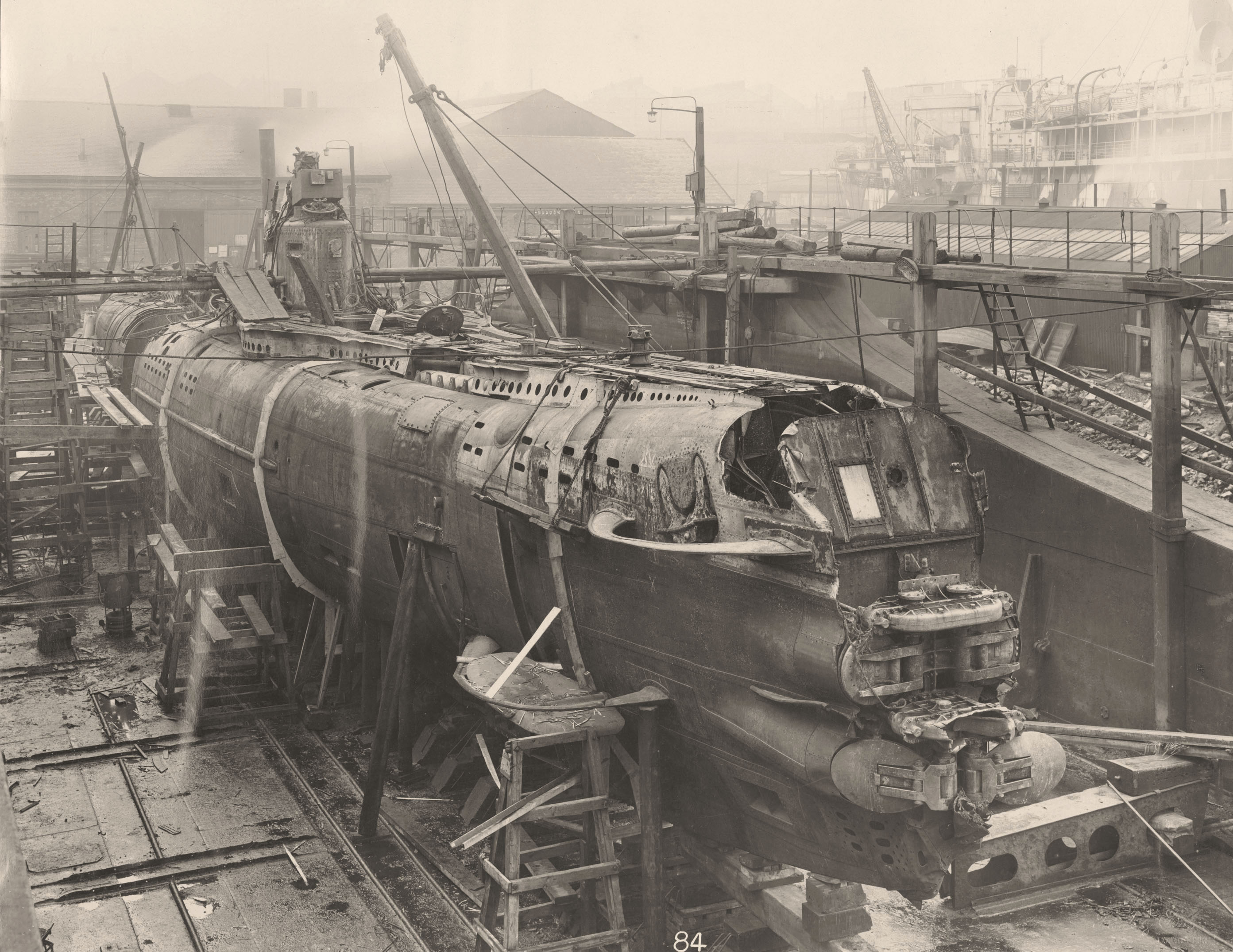
- UB-110 being repaired at Swan Hunter's dry dock in 1918

History

German Empire
- Name: UB-110
- Ordered: 6 / 8 February 1917
- Builder: Blohm & Voss, Hamburg
- Cost: 3,714,000 German Papiermark
- Yard number: 316
- Launched: 1 September 1917
- Commissioned: 23 March 1918
- Fate: Sunk 19 July 1918, raised and scrapped

General characteristics
- Class & type: Type UB III submarine
- Displacement: 519 t (511 long tons) surfaced; 649 t (639 long tons) submerged
- Length: 55.30 m (181 ft 5 in) (o/a)
- Beam: 5.80 m (19 ft)
- Draught: 3.70 m (12 ft 2 in)
- Propulsion: 2 × propeller shaft; 2 ×MAN-Vulcan four-stroke 6-cylinder diesel engines, 1,085 bhp (809 kW); 2 × Maffei electric motors, 780 shp (580 kW)
- Speed: 13.3 knots (24.6 km/h; 15.3 mph) surfaced; 7.5 knots (13.9 km/h; 8.6 mph) submerged
- Range: 7,420 nmi (13,740 km; 8,540 mi) at 6 knots (11 km/h; 6.9 mph) surfaced; 55 nmi (102 km; 63 mi) at 4 knots (7.4 km/h; 4.6 mph) submerged
- Test depth: 50 m (160 ft)
- Complement: 3 officers, (max.)31 men
- Armament: 5 × 50 cm (19.7 in) torpedo tubes (4 bow, 1 stern); 10 torpedoes; 1 × 8.8 cm (3.46 in) deck gun

Service record
- Part of: Flandern II Flotilla; 27 June – 19 July 1918
- Commanders: Kptlt. Werner Fürbringer; 23 March – 19 July 1918
- Operations: 2 patrols
- Victories: 1 merchant ship sunk (3,709 GRT); 1 auxiliary warship damaged (1,137 GRT)

SM UB-110 was a German Type UB III submarine or U-boat in the German Imperial Navy (German: Kaiserliche Marine) during World War I.

== Construction ==
UB-110 was built by Blohm & Voss of Hamburg. After just under a year of construction, it was launched at Hamburg on 1 September 1917 and commissioned in the spring of 1918 under the command of Kptlt. Werner Fürbringer. Like all Type UB III submarines, UB-110 carried ten torpedoes and was armed with an 8.8 cm (3.46 in) deck gun, carried a crew of three officers and up to 31 men, and had a cruising range of 7,420 nautical miles (13,740 km; 8,540 mi). It had a displacement of 519 t (511 long tons) while surfaced and 649 t (639 long tons) when submerged. Its engines enabled it to travel at 13.3 knots (24.6 km/h; 15.3 mph) when surfaced and 7.4 knots (13.7 km/h; 8.5 mph) when submerged.

== Ships hit by UB-110 ==
During its lifetime, UB-110 is confirmed to have torpedoed two ships, the Sprucol and the Southborough. The Sprucol was a 1,137 GRT tanker being operated by the Royal Fleet Auxiliary at the time of engagement, when it was damaged off the English coast but made it back to the Humber with no casualties. The 3,709-ton civilian steamer Southborough was not to be so lucky, sunk 5 miles off the east coast of Scarborough on 16 July 1918 with the loss of 30 civilian lives.

== Sinking ==
The submarine was commissioned into the German Imperial Navy on 23 March 1918 as SM UB-110. (Note: "SM" stands for "Seiner Majestät" (English: His Majesty's) and combined with the U for Unterseeboot would be translated as His Majesty's Submarine.)

On 19 July 1918, while under the command of Kapitänleutnant Werner Fürbringer, UB-110 was depth charged, rammed, and sunk near the Tees at position at 54°39′N 0°55′W by HMS Garry, commanded by Charles Lightoller, the senior surviving crew member of the sinking of RMS Titanic in 1912. This was possibly the last U-boat sinking during the Great War.

In his 1933 memoirs, Fürbringer alleged that, after the sinking, HMS Garry hove to and opened fire with revolvers and machine guns on the unarmed crew in the water. He states that he saw the skull of his 18-year old steward split open by a lump of coal hurled by a member of Garry's crew. He also states that when he attempted to help a wounded officer to swim, the man said, "Let me die in peace. The swine are going to murder us anyhow." The memoir states that the shooting ceased only when the convoy that the destroyer had been escorting, and that contained many neutral-flagged ships, arrived on the scene, at which point "as if by magic the British now let down some life boats into the water."

While Lightoller does not mention any massacre in his own recounting of the sinking, he does state that he "refused to accept the hands up air" business. Lightoller explained, "In fact it was simply amazing that they should have had the infernal audacity to offer to surrender, in view of their ferocious and pitiless attacks on our merchant ships. Destroyer versus Destroyer, as in the Dover Patrol, was fair game and no favour. One could meet them and take them on as a decent antagonist. But towards the submarine men, one felt an utter disgust and loathing; they were nothing but an abomination, polluting the clean sea." Lightoller claimed that he simply "left the rescue work to the others", and was more concerned about his own ship, which took serious damage in the ramming.

Lieutenant Commander Lightoller was awarded a bar to his Distinguished Service Cross for sinking UB-110. Contradictory information exists about the numbers of UB-110's crew lost, with Lightoller claiming 15 survivors with 13 lost, while a German account claims 13 survivors with 21 lost, most in the post-battle massacre. Official British records list 12 survivors.

According to historian P Armstrong, substantial uncertainty persists about the incident. This is due to the political climate around the publication of Fürbringer's memoirs, and the lack of earlier primary sources on the German side. According to Fürbringer's interrogation record, the large numbers of deaths were due to ships firing on the surfaced submarine as the crew tried to abandon ship, and a jammed hatch that caused a panic amongst the men. Armstrong suggests that a more likely culprit is not Garry but instead motor launches of the Auxiliary Patrol who claimed to have raked the stricken submarine with machine gun fire, a destroyer being unlikely to have the small arms available to conduct the massacre. Arndt, the steward Fürbringer reports as being killed by a block of coal, does not exist on the official German crew list.

== Rescue operation ==
HMTBD Bonetta arrived late on the scene and picked up five survivors, including the captain, but one of them, the engineer officer, died on deck immediately after being taken out of the water. The German captain, despite the ordeal he had come through, proved himself to be a very self-possessed individual when examined in the chart room. He expressed the opinion that Germany would shortly win the war, but he was a long way out in his calculation, as Germany was defeated six weeks later. The Bonetta's duties around that time had included picking up many, badly wounded, survivors, and dead, from fishing boats, which had been shelled by a German submarine, off the entrance to the Tyne. The crew of the Bonetta were not made aware of any massacre.

== Boat raised ==
UB-110 was raised on 4 October 1918 and broken up at Swan Hunter shipyard on the Tyne. An album of photographs of the vessel has been shared by Tyne and Wear Archives "The sinking and raising of UB-110"

The British were unsettled by the discovery during its salvage was that some of its torpedoes were fitted with magnetic firing pistols—the first they were able to properly identify. These early examples were problematic, often detonating their weapons prematurely if at all.

== Summary of raiding history ==
Date	Name	Nationality	Tonnage (Note: Merchant ship tonnages are in gross register tons. Military vessels are listed by tons displacement.)	Fate
10 July 1918	RFA Sprucol	(United Kingdom) Royal Fleet Auxiliary	1,137	Damaged
16 July 1918	Southborough	United Kingdom	3,709	Sunk

== Bibliography ==
- Bendert, Harald (2000). Die UB-Boote der Kaiserlichen Marine, 1914-1918. Einsätze, Erfolge, Schicksal (in German). Hamburg: Verlag E.S. Mittler & Sohn GmbH. ISBN 3-8132-0713-7.
- Gröner, Erich; Jung, Dieter; Maass, Martin (1991). U-boats and Mine Warfare Vessels. German Warships 1815–1945. Vol. 2. Translated by Thomas, Keith; Magowan, Rachel. London: Conway Maritime Press. ISBN 0-85177-593-4.
- Rössler, Eberhard (1979). Die deutschen U-Boote und ihre Werften: eine Bilddokumentation über den deutschen U-Bootbau; in zwei Bänden (in German). Vol. I. Munich: Bernard & Graefe. ISBN 3-7637-5213-7.
