= Simon Crane =

British stuntman and stunt coordinator

Simon Crane (born 1960) is a British stuntman, stunt coordinator, second unit director and film director.

== Biography ==
Born in Twickenham, Middlesex, England. Crane was originally a law student, but not liking it, he dropped out after one year and worked as an acrobat in a circus for three years. To fulfill English requirements for stuntmen to achieve instructor level in six sports, Crane became an instructor in gymnastics, parachuting, scuba diving, high diving, karate, and fencing. When he could not obtain a union card as a stuntman fast enough, he became an instructor in three more sports, including hang gliding. His father, Dr. John Crane, was the doctor for Arsenal F.C. and the England national football team.

=== Career ===
Crane's first major work came in the 1985 Bond film A View to a Kill. In 1987 he became Timothy Dalton's stunt double in The Living Daylights. He also played the character of Che Che in a reenactment of the "gatecrasher" fight scene from On Her Majesty's Secret Service traditionally used to test the fighting skills of actors up for the part of James Bond. Vic Armstrong coordinated the fight. Actors believed to have tested opposite Crane in the screen tests include Mark Greenstreet, Sam Neill and Pierce Brosnan.

After spending five years as the apprentice to an experienced stunt coordinator, Crane was allowed to act as second unit stunt coordinator on Licence to Kill. In 1993, Crane performed the dangerous-looking aerial transfer for the film Cliffhanger, for which he earned an entry in the Guinness Book of World Records for being part of the most expensive stunt ever performed. It cost $1 million to have Simon Crane descending on a rope between two planes at an altitude of 4,572 m (15,000 ft). Sylvester Stallone allotted the amount from his own salary to pay for the stunt.

In 1995 he became the overall stunt coordinator for GoldenEye – the opening bungee jump was voted the greatest film stunt ever in a poll for Sky Movies. After a four-year break from the Bond franchise, during which he coordinated stunts for the Academy Award-winning films Titanic (in which he happened to play fourth officer Joseph Boxhall, and had two lines) and Saving Private Ryan, Crane returned to handle the stunts for The World Is Not Enough, with Vic Armstrong as second unit director.

Crane also took the role of stunt coordinator in Will Smith's Hancock (2008). He was to make his directorial début directing a film adaptation of the popular video game, Kane & Lynch: Dead Men but departed from the project. Crane directed the 3-D supernatural thriller The Peak, which was based on a screenplay from Neal Marshall Stevens and Crane worked with Will Smith again as second unit director and stunt coordinator on Men in Black 3.

== Filmography ==
Year	Title	Stunts	Second unit director	Director
1990	Robin Hood: Prince of Thieves	Yes	No	Kevin Reynolds
1994	Frankenstein	Yes	Yes	Kenneth Branagh
1995	Braveheart	Yes	No	Mel Gibson
1995	GoldenEye	Yes	No	Martin Campbell
1996	101 Dalmatians	Yes	No	Stephen Herek
1997	Titanic	Yes	No	James Cameron
1998	Saving Private Ryan	Yes	No	Steven Spielberg
1999	The Mummy	Yes	No	Stephen Sommers
1999	The World Is Not Enough	Yes	No	Michael Apted
2000	Vertical Limit	Yes	Yes	Martin Campbell
2001	Lara Croft: Tomb Raider	Yes	Yes	Simon West
2002	Enough	Yes	Yes	Michael Apted
2003	Terminator 3: Rise of the Machines	Yes	Yes	Jonathan Mostow
2003	Lara Croft: Tomb Raider - The Cradle of Life	Yes	Yes	Jan De Bont
2003	Beyond Borders	Yes	Yes	Martin Campbell
2004	Troy	Yes	Yes	Wolfgang Petersen
2005	Mr. & Mrs. Smith	Yes	Yes	Doug Liman
2006	X-Men: The Last Stand	Yes	Yes	Brett Ratner
2007	Stardust	Yes	Yes	Matthew Vaughn
2008	Quantum of Solace	No	Yes	Marc Forster
2008	Jumper	Yes	Yes	Doug Liman
2008	Bedtime Stories	No	Yes	Adam Shankman
2008	Hancock	Yes	Yes	Peter Berg
2009	Surrogates	No	Yes	Jonathan Mostow
2011	Your Highness	Yes	Yes	David Gordon Green
2011	In the Land of Blood and Honey	Yes	Yes	Angelina Jolie
2012	Men in Black 3	Yes	Yes	Barry Sonnenfeld
2013	World War Z	Yes	Yes	Marc Forster
2014	Maleficent	Yes	Yes	Robert Stromberg
2014	Edge of Tomorrow	Yes	Yes	Doug Liman
2016	Jason Bourne	No	Yes	Paul Greengrass
2016	The Huntsman: Winter's War	No	Yes	Cedric Nicolas-Troyan
2016	Rogue One: A Star Wars Story	Yes	Yes	Gareth Edwards
2018	Robin Hood	Yes	No	Otto Bathurst
2019	Fast and Furious Presents: Hobbs and Shaw	Yes	Yes	David Leitch
2019	Maleficent: Mistress of Evil	Yes	Yes	Joachim Rønning
2020	Dolittle	Yes	Yes	Stephen Gaghan
2021	Chaos Walking	Yes	Yes	Doug Liman
2021	Infinite	Yes	Yes	Antoine Fuqua

Actor:

- The Living Daylights (1987) – Gibraltar Soldier #1 (uncredited)
- Blue Ice (1992) – Secret Serviceman (uncredited)
- GoldenEye (1995) – Lt. François Brouse – Tiger Helicopter Pilot (uncredited)
- Titanic (1997) – 4th Officer Joseph Boxhall
