= Herbert Druitt =

English solicitor and collector (1876–1943)

Herbert Druitt (4 January 1876 – 16 November 1943) was a solicitor and collector of antiquities. His collection formed the basis of the Red House Museum in Christchurch, Dorset.

== Biography ==
Herbert Druitt was born in Christchurch, Hampshire (now in Dorset) in 1876 , the son of Matilda and James Druitt, a solicitor. He studied classics at Oxford. The family wealth meant he did not have to work and he described himself as being of independent means in the census of 1911. He served as a member of the Christchurch Town council for several years and was defeated for the office of Mayor in 1927. His half-brother, James Druitt, became Town Clerk and then Mayor of Bournemouth.

His passion was collecting objects relating to the local area including flint implements, pottery, prints, watercolours, shells, coins and birds’ eggs. It was described as one of the finest private collections in the south of England. In 1909 Matilda Druitt bought the building known as the Red House, the old Christchurch workhouse. In 1916, after his mother’s death, it passed to Herbert Druitt who used it to house his collection. He sometimes opened the building to visitors but was often reluctant to show his collection. He was also reluctant to publish anything about his collection though he did publish on local history subjects without referring to his collection. In the 1939 register, he describes his profession as museum curator unpaid. His collection of flint tools, pottery, fossils, shells, books, and pamphlets filled three buildings.

Druitt's most substantial publication was a book on the history of costume. Between 1919 and 1933, he edited and published the Christchurch Miscellany to which he contributed many articles. In 1934, he contributed the chapter on Christchurch to 'The Book of Bournemouth' which was written for the visit of the British Medical Association's to Bournemouth.

Herbert Druitt died in 1943 leaving an estate valued at £21303 2s 2d. His estate and the Red House passed to his sister Charlotte. When she died in January 1947, she left the Red House and the collection in trust as a museum for the people of Christchurch.

== Bibliography ==
- Druitt, Herbert (1906). A manual of costume as illustrated by monumental brasses. London: Alexander Moring, Ltd., The De La More Press, 1906.
- Druitt, Herbert (1919 - 1932). Christchurch Miscellany. Christchurch
- Watson Smith, Dr S (Ed) (1934).The Book of Bournemouth Written for the One Hundred and Second Annual Meeting of the British Medical Association. Bournemouth:BMA.
