= Albany Academy, Chorley =

Albany Academy
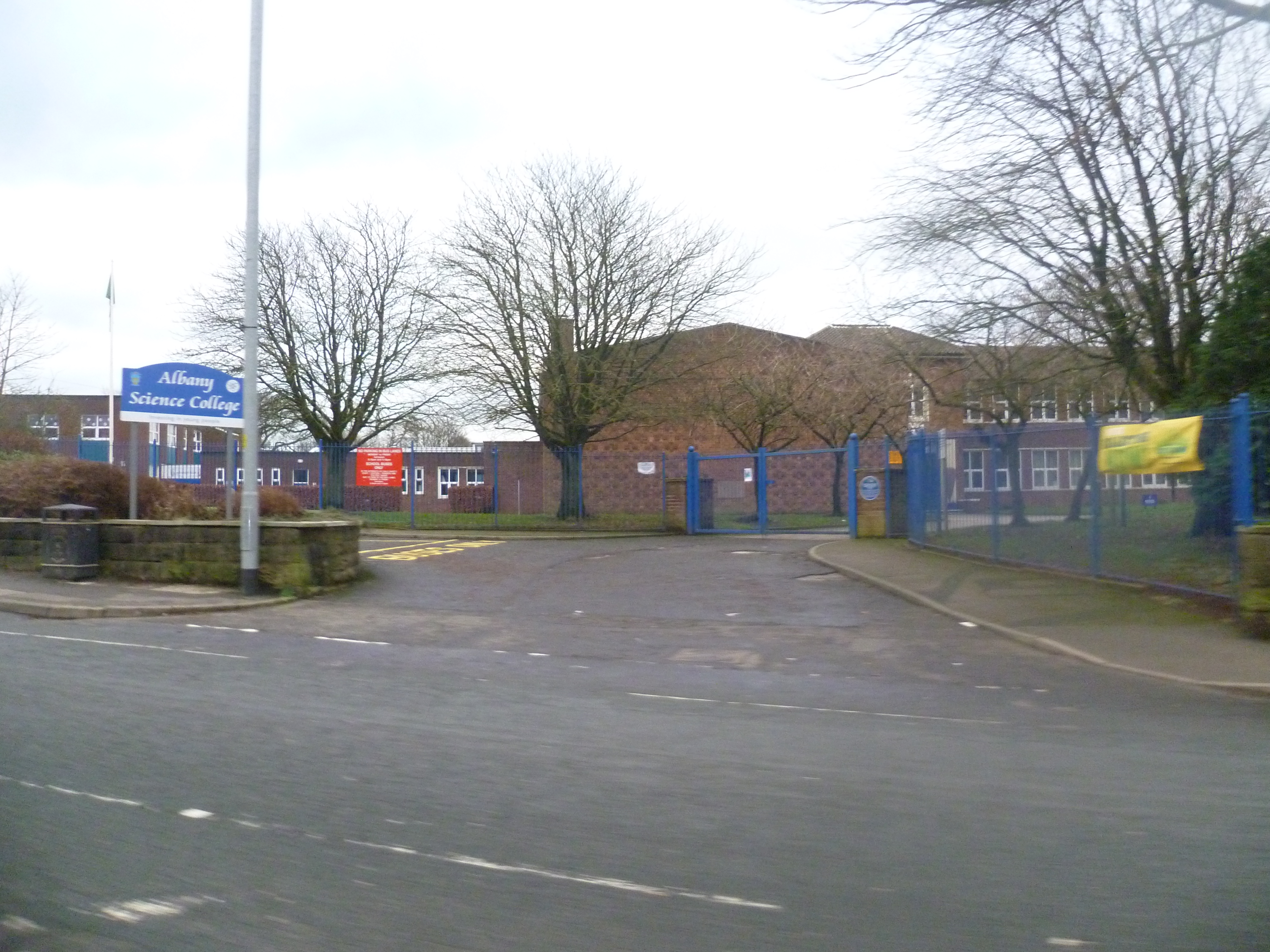
- View of the school (2011)

Location
- Bolton Road; Chorley, Lancashire, PR7 3AY; England; 53°38′35″N 2°37′10″W

Information
- Type: Academy
- Motto: Loyalty
- Religious affiliation: None
- Established: 1960
- Department for Education URN: 138544 Tables
- Ofsted: Reports
- Chair: Helen Brown
- Head teacher: Peter Mayland
- Gender: Mixed
- Age: 11 to 16
- Enrolment: 688
- Colour: Blue
- School Canteen Hygiene Rating: 5/5
- Website: https://albanyacademy.co.uk/

Albany Academy (formerly Albany Science College, Albany High School and St Alban's) is a secondary school with academy status located on the south side of Chorley, Lancashire, England.

Albany Academy has specialist status in science and was one of the first schools in the country to convert to academy status. The school is the founding member of the Albany Learning Trust, a Multi-academy trust - the first Trust of its type in Lancashire.

== History ==
=== Secondary school ===
The school was originally opened as St. Alban's, and was built on the former Yarrow House next to the river of the same name. In 1982, the School adopted a new name, Albany High School, and was subsequently renamed Albany Science College, before becoming Albany Academy when it converted to academy status.

The school was rated good by Ofsted on 5 March 2024.

=== Buildings ===
The former house was the birthplace and childhood home of Charles Lightoller, the second officer and highest ranking surviving crew member of RMS Titanic. This has been commemorated by a blue plaque on the school gates and the renaming of the school's canteen to Lightoller's Diner.

Albany Academy have developed opportunities and social activities focused on leisure, health and career development. In addition, a wide range of services and facilities available to hire by community groups, local sports clubs and businesses in the local area.

Facilities are available for hire. These include: Sports Hall, Gymnasium, Fully fitted fitness suite Classrooms with ICT facilities and large hall with stage and a sports field.

== Educational Results ==
Albany Academy is consistently one of the top ten performing schools in Lancashire. The school is outstanding in pupil behaviour and safety and is also outstanding in leadership and management

== Media ==
The school appeared on the TV Show Canteen Rescue in 2010, after winning an award to have the school canteen re-decorated. The theme was a 1950s style American Diner.

== Employment ==
Albany Academy is accredited as a Living Wage Employer.
