= Werner Fürbringer =

German World War I U-boat commander

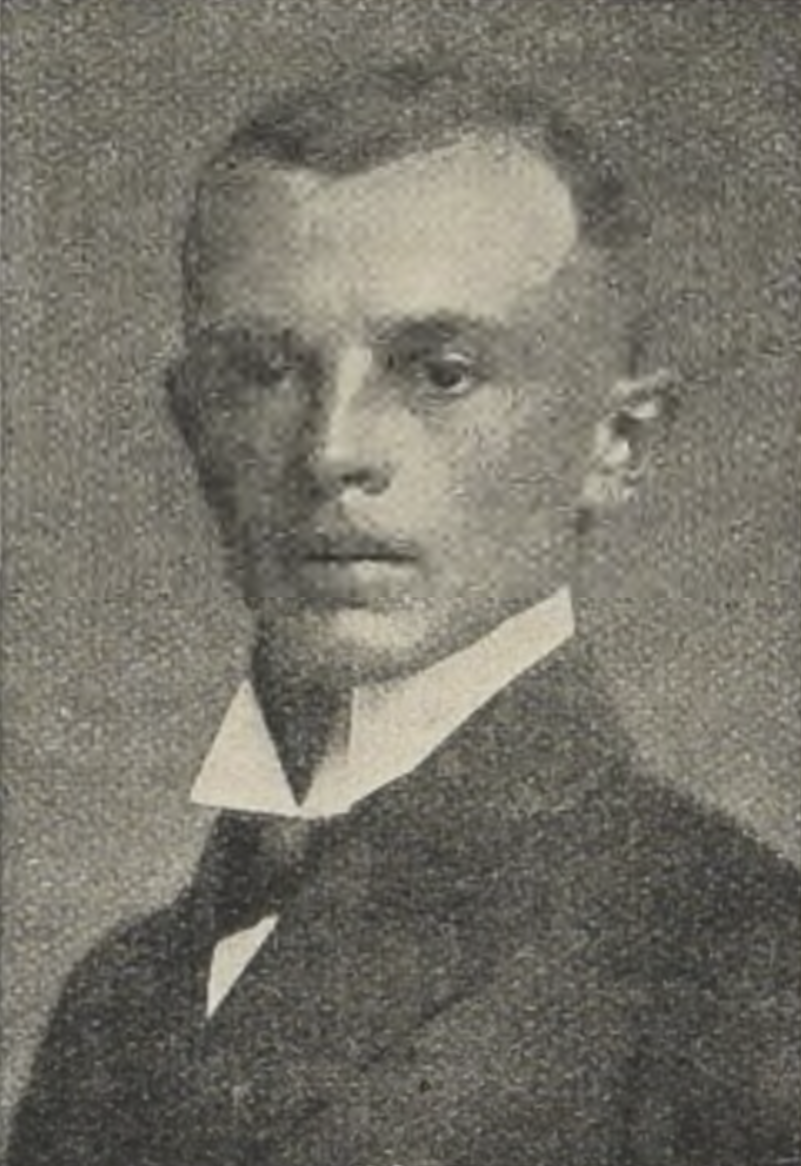
- Born: 2 October 1888; Braunschweig, Duchy of Brunswick, German Empire
- Died: 8 February 1982 (aged 93); Braunschweig, Lower Saxony, West Germany
- Relatives: ∞ 1916 Käte Rennau; 4 children
- Military career
- Allegiance: German Empire (to 1918); Weimar Republic (to 1933); Nazi Germany
- Branch: Imperial German Navy; Reichsmarine; Kriegsmarine
- Service years: 1907–20, 1927–43
- Rank: Konteradmiral
- Nickname: "Fips"
- Commands: UB-110
- Conflicts: World War I World War II
- Awards: House Order of Hohenzollern; Iron Cross, 1st Class

Werner "Fips" Fürbringer (2 October 1888 – 8 February 1982) was a successful German U-boat commander in the Kaiserliche Marine during World War I, sinking 101 ships. He was later promoted to the rank of Konteradmiral during World War II.

== Life ==
Fürbringer was born in Braunschweig and entered the Imperial German Navy as a Seekadett on 3 April 1907. Subsequently, he attended basic training and was assigned on training ship SMS Charlotte. He also attended the Naval Academy and was promoted to the rank of Fähnrich zur See (officer candidate).

He then spent some time aboard the cruiser SMS Roon, sailing in East Asia within the High Seas Fleet, before being transferred to the Heavy cruiser SMS Scharnhorst. During the time of his transfer, Fürbringer was promoted to the rank of Leutnant zur See on 28 September 1910.

Spending another two years with the East Asia Squadron in Jiaozhou Bay Leased Territory, Fürbringer returned home in November 1912 and was selected for U-boat training.

=== World War I ===
Fürbringer served aboard U-20, but left prior to the U-20's sinking of RMS Lusitania in 1915. He exclusively commanded small, coastal U-boats, starting with UB-2 in February 1915. He went on to command six subsequent UB and UC-type boats, during which time he was awarded the Iron Cross, Second and First class. He was a successful commerce raider, responsible for sinking 101 (mostly small, coastal) ships (totaling 97,881 GRT) and damaged five others (of 9,033 GRT). On 9 December 1916, he married and would have four children. In 1942, his only daughter Ingeborg (b. 10 January 1921 in Hamburg) married Major (later Oberst of the Bundeswehr) Hans-Joachim Karl Wilhelm Hellmuth Keitel (1917–2004), only son of General Bodewin Keitel.

His last command was UB-110, which was depth-charged and rammed by HMS Garry on 19 July 1918. The Garry's commanding officer was Lieutenant Commander Charles Lightoller. Years later, in his postwar memoirs (1933), Fürbringer accused the Garry's crew of opening fire with revolvers and machine guns on the unarmed survivors after the sinking of UB-110. Fürbringer alleged that he watched the skull of an 18-year-old member of his crew being split open by a lump of coal hurled by a crewmember from the Garry. When Fürbringer attempted to help a wounded officer to swim, he alleges the man said, "Let me die in peace. The swine are going to murder us anyhow." Fürbringer claimed the shooting only ceased when the convoy the destroyer had been escorting and which contained many neutral-flagged ships, arrived on scene. He later recalled, "As if by magic the British now let down some life boats into the water." Fürbringer was captured and spent the rest of the war as a prisoner of war.

Lightoller was awarded a Bar to the Distinguished Service Cross for sinking SM UB-110. Contradictory information exists about the numbers of UB-110's crew lost, with Lightoller claiming 15 survivors with 13 lost, while a German account claims 13 survivors with 21 lost, most in the alleged post-battle events.

=== World War II ===
In the inter-war years Furbringer served in various capacities, and at the start of the Second World War he was appointed commander of Submarine Defence Department of Germany's Naval High Command (OKM). In 1942 he was promoted to Konteradmiral, and was Inspector of Armaments in the occupied Eastern Territories. He was released from service in June 1943.

== Death ==
Rear Admiral (Ret.) Werner Furbringer died in Brunswick in February 1982.

== U-boat commands ==
Werner Furbringer held command of seven U-boats during World War I

- UB-2: Feb 1915-Mar 1916
- UB-17: Mar 1916
- UB-39: Apr-Nov 1916
- UC-70: Nov 1916-Jun 1917
- UC-17: May-Aug 1917
- UB-58: Aug 1917-Feb 1918
- UB-110: Mar-July 1918

== Promotions ==
- 3 April 1907 Seekadett (Officer Candidate)
- 21 April 1908 Fähnrich zur See (Officer Cadet)
- 28 September 1910 Leutnant zur See (2nd Lieutenant)
- 27 September 1913 Oberleutnant zur See (1st Lieutenant)
- 16 November 1917 Kapitänleutnant (Lieutenant Captain)
- 1 October 1933 Kapitänleutnant a. D./L-Offizier (retired Lieutenant Captain and state protection officer; Landesschutzoffizier) with the emoluments of a Fregattenkapitän
- 15 May 1934 Fregattenkapitän a. D./L-Offizier (retired Frigate Captain / Commander and state protection officer; Landesschutzoffizier)
- 5 March 1935 Fregattenkapitän/E-Offizier (supplemental Frigate Captain / Commander; Ergänzungsoffizier)
  - 1 May 1937 received new and improved Rank Seniority (RDA) from 1 October 1933
- 1 October 1937 Kapitän zur See/E-Offizier (supplemental Captain at Sea / Captain / Colonel; Ergänzungsoffizier)
- 19 April 1941 Kapitän zur See (active Captain at Sea / Captain / Colonel) with effect from 20 April 1941 and RDA from 1 October 1937
- 1 December 1942 Konteradmiral (Rear Admiral)
- 1 July 1943 Konteradmiral z. V. (Rear Admiral at disposal)

== Awards and decorations ==
- Iron Cross (1914), 2nd and 1st Class
  - 2nd Class on 20 February 1915
  - 1st Class on 10 October 1915
- War Merit Cross (Brunswick) in May 1915
- House Order of Hohenzollern, Knight's Cross with Swords (HOH3X) on 31 August 1916
- Hamburg Hanseatic Cross (HH) on 8 August 1917
- Lübeck Hanseatic Cross (LübH/LüH)
- U-boat War Badge (1918)
- The Honour Cross of the World War 1914/1918 with Swords on 7 February 1935
- Wehrmacht Long Service Award, 4th and 3rd Class on 2 October 1936
- War Merit Cross (1939), 2nd and 1st Class with Swords
  - 2nd Class on 30 January 1941
  - 1st Class in 30 January 1942

== Publications ==
- Werner (Fips) Fürbringer: Alarm! Tauchen!! U-Boot in Kampf und Sturm, Ullstein, Berlin 1933, ISBN 978-0023535338. English translation: Fips: Legendary U-Boat Commander, 1915-1918, Naval Institute Press, 2000, ISBN 978-1557502865.
