= SM U-18 =

German World War I submarine

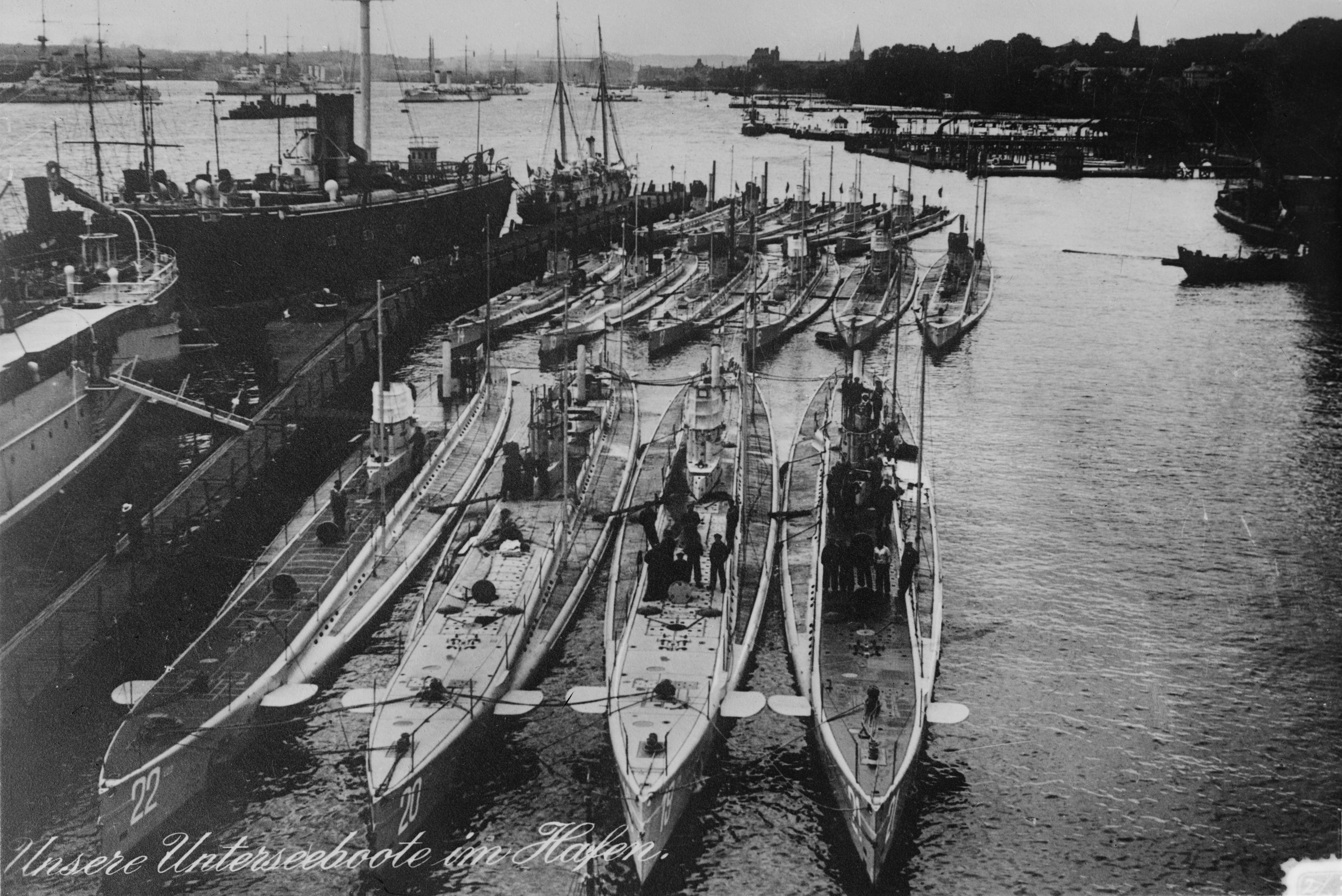
- SM U-18 (second row, second from the right)

History

Germany
- Name: U-18
- Ordered: May 6, 1910
- Builder: Kaiserliche Werft Danzig
- Cost: 2,333,000 Goldmark
- Yard number: 12
- Laid down: 27 October 1910
- Launched: 25 April 1912
- Commissioned: 17 November 1912
- Fate: Scuttled on 23 November 1914

General characteristics
- Class & type: Type U 17 submarine
- Displacement: 564 t (555 long tons) surfaced; 691 t (680 long tons) submerged
- Length: 62.35 m (204 ft 7 in)
- Beam: 6 m (19 ft 8 in)
- Height: 7.30 m (23 ft 11 in)
- Draught: 3.40 m (11 ft 2 in)
- Propulsion: 2 shafts; 2 × 2 Körting 8-cylinder two stroke paraffin motors with 1,400 PS (1,030 kW; 1,380 shp); 2 × AEG electric motors with 1,120 PS (820 kW; 1,100 shp); 550 rpm surfaced; 425 rpm submerged
- Speed: 14.9 knots (27.6 km/h; 17.1 mph) surfaced; 9.5 knots (17.6 km/h; 10.9 mph) submerged
- Range: 6,700 nmi (12,400 km; 7,700 mi) at 8 kn surfaced; 75 nmi (139 km; 86 mi) at 5 kn submerged
- Test depth: 50 m (164 ft 1 in)
- Boats & landing craft carried: 1 dingi
- Complement: 4 officers, 25 men
- Armament: 4 × 45 cm (17.7 in) torpedo tubes (2 each bow and stern) with 6 torpedoes

Service record
- Part of: II Flotilla; 1 August – 23 November 1914
- Commanders: Kptlt. Heinrich von Henning; 1 August – 23 November 1914
- Operations: 3 patrols
- Victories: None

SM U-18 (Note: "SM" stands for "Seiner Majestät" (English: His Majesty's) and combined with the U for Unterseeboot would be translated as His Majesty's Submarine.) was one of 329 submarines serving in the Imperial German Navy in World War I. U-18 engaged in commerce warfare in the First Battle of the Atlantic.

== Service history ==
Beginning in October 1914, she was commanded by Kaptlt. von Hennig.

On her third mission, on 23 November U-18 penetrated the fleet anchorage of Scapa Flow via Hoxa Sound, following a steamer through the boom and entering the anchorage with little difficulty. However, the fleet was absent, being dispersed in anchorages on the west coast of Scotland and Ireland. As U-18 was making her way back out through Hoxa Sound to the open sea, her periscope was spotted by a guard boat. The trawler Dorothy Gray altered course and rammed the periscope, rendering it unserviceable. U-18 then suffered a failure of her diving plane motor and the boat became unable to maintain her depth, at one point even impacting the seabed. She was rammed a second time by destroyer HMS Garry and eventually, her captain was forced to surface and scuttle his command just outside the Hoxa Gate; all crew members, except one, were picked up by British boats. One crew member died, while the remaining 22 were interned as prisoners of war.

The wreck lies 75 m (246 ft) below the surface just outside the Hoxa Gate, at 58°41′N 02°55′W.
