= SS Runic =

Several ships have borne the name SS Runic:

- SS Runic was a livestock carrier launched in 1889 at Harland & Wolff. She was sold to the West India & Pacific SS Company in 1895 and renamed Tampican. Sold again in 1912, she was renamed SS Imo and was involved in the 1917 Halifax Explosion. She was renamed Guvernøren in 1918 and was wrecked in 1921.
- SS Runic (1900) was a passenger liner launched in 1900 at Harland & Wolff for the White Star Line. She was sold to Christian Salvesen in 1930, converted to a whale factory ship and renamed New Sevilla. She was torpedoed and sunk in 1940.
- SS Runic (1949) was a refrigerated cargo ship launched at Harland & Wolff in 1949 for Shaw, Savill & Albion Line, she was wrecked in 1961 on Middleton Reef on a voyage from Brisbane, Australia to New Zealand in 1961 after going through the tail end of a cyclone.
