= HMS Garry =

Destroyer of the Royal Navy

History

United Kingdom
- Name: Garry
- Ordered: 1903 – 1904 Naval Estimates
- Builder: Yarrows, Poplar
- Laid down: 25 November 1904
- Launched: 21 March 1905
- Commissioned: September 1905
- Out of service: 1919 laid up in reserve awaiting disposal
- Fate: 22 October 1920 sold to J.H. Lee for breaking

General characteristics
- Class & type: Yarrow Type River Class destroyer
- Displacement: 590 long tons (599 t) standard; 660 long tons (671 t) full load; 231 ft 4 in (70.51 m) o/a; 23 ft 6 in (7.16 m) Beam; 7 ft 2.5 in (2.197 m) Draught
- Propulsion: 4 × Yarrow type water tube boiler; 2 × Vertical Triple Expansion (VTE) steam engines driving 2 shafts producing 7,000 shp (5,200 kW) (average)
- Speed: 25.5 kn (47.2 km/h)
- Range: 130 tons coal; 1,620 nmi (3,000 km) at 11 kn (20 km/h)
- Complement: 70 officers and men
- Armament: 1 × QF 12-pounder 12 cwt Mark I, mounting P Mark I; 3 × QF 12-pounder 8 cwt, mounting G Mark I (Added in 1906); 5 × QF 6-pdr naval gun (removed in 1906); 2 × single tubes for 18-inch (450mm) torpedoes

Service record
- Part of: East Coast Destroyer Flotilla - 1904; 3rd Destroyer Flotilla - April 1909; 5th Destroyer Flotilla - 1912; Assigned E Class - Aug 1912 - Oct 1913; 9th Destroyer Flotilla - 1914; 7th Destroyer Flotilla - August 1915
- Operations: World War I 1914 - 1918
- Victories: U-18 23 November 1914; UB-110 19 July 1918

HMS Garry was a Yarrow-type River-class destroyer of the Royal Navy built under the 1903 – 1904 Naval Estimates. Named after the River Garry in north central Scotland, she was the first ship to carry this name in the Royal Navy.

== Construction ==
She was ordered under the 1903 – 1904 Naval Estimates, laid down on 25 November 1904 at the Yarrow shipyard at Poplar and launched on 21 March 1905. She was completed in September 1905. Her original armament was to be the same as the turtleback torpedo boat destroyers that preceded her. In 1906 the Admiralty decided to upgrade the armament by landing the five 6-pounder naval guns and shipping three 12-pounder 8 hundredweight (cwt) guns. Two would be mounted abeam at the foc's'le break and the third gun would be mounted on the quarterdeck.

== Pre-war ==
After commissioning she was assigned to the East Coast Destroyer Flotilla of the 1st Fleet and based at Harwich.

On 26 July 1907, Garry and the destroyer Waveney collided off Sandown, damaging both ships.

In April 1909, she was assigned to the 3rd Destroyer Flotilla on its formation at Harwich. She remained until displaced by a Beagle-class destroyer by May 1912. She was assigned to the 5th Destroyer Flotilla of the Second Fleet with a nucleus crew.

On 30 August 1912 the Admiralty directed all destroyer classes were to be designated by alpha characters starting with the letter 'A'. The ships of the River class were assigned to the E class. After 30 September 1913, she was known as an E class destroyer and had the letter 'E' painted on the hull below the bridge area and on either the fore or aft funnel.

== First World War ==
In early 1914, when displaced by G-class destroyers she joined the 9th Destroyer Flotilla based at Chatham, tendered to St George. The 9th Flotilla was a patrol flotilla tasked with anti-submarine and counter-mining patrols in the Firth of Forth area. By September she had been redeployed to Scapa Flow Local Flotilla and tendered to Orion. Here she provided anti-submarine and counter mining patrols in defence of the main fleet anchorage.

On 23 November 1914, the German submarine U-18 was attempting to enter Scapa Flow when it was spotted in Pentland Firth and was rammed by the naval trawler Dorothy Grey. In an attempt to escape U-18 dived, struck bottom forcing her back to the surface. Garry then rammed U-18 which sank at position 58°41′N 002°55′W with the loss of one person and 22 survivors becoming prisoners of war.

In August 1915, with the amalgamation of the 7th and 9th Flotillas, she was assigned to the 1st Destroyer Flotilla when it was redeployed to Portsmouth in November 1916. She was equipped with depth charges for employment in anti-submarine patrols, escorting of merchant ships and defending the Dover Barrage. In the spring of 1917 as the convoy system was being introduced the 1st Flotilla was employed in convoy escort duties for the English Channel for the remainder of the war.

On 19 July 1918, Garry (Lt Cdr Charles Lightoller RNR) attacked the German submarine UB-110 off the north coast of Yorkshire. Damaged by the depth-charge attack, the U-boat surfaced and was rammed by Garry at position 54°39′N 00°55′E. According to a British account, UB-110 sank with the loss of 13 of her men. There were 15 survivors. According to the German commander, decades later, all but the two radio operators were able to escape from the sinking U-boat, but the survivors were subsequently attacked while in the water with the result that only 13 of the crew of 34 survived.

Lightoller's memoir of his war service did not confirm that the ship in question was the UB-110 nor explicitly stating that he gave an order to fire on unarmed men in the water attempting surrender. However, he did note of his low opinion of submariners and of one unspecified occasion where he claimed he refused to "accept the hands-up business":

"The man that could sink a merchantman, from below the surface, without giving him the ghost of a chance, must have had a mentality lower than the worst aborigine and heaven knows, they glory in some pretty flthy practices.

Anyhow, that was my feeling about them and their work, so I suppose there was little wonder that when one did surrender to us, I refused to accept the hands-up business. In fact it was simply amazing that they should have had the infernal audacity to offer to surrender, in view of their ferocious and pitiless attacks on our merchant ships.

Destroyer versus Destroyer, as in the Dover Patrol, was fair game and no favour. One could meet them and take them on as a decent antagonist. But towards the submarine men, one felt an utter disgust and loathing; they were nothing but an abomination, polluting the clean sea."

The wreck was raised by the Royal Navy in October 1918. Lt Cdr Lightoller was awarded a bar to his DSC for this action.

== Disposition ==
In 1919, she was in collision with Attentive and not repaired. She was placed on the disposal list. On 22 October 1920, she was sold to J. H. Lee for breaking up.

She was not awarded a battle honour for her service.

== Pennant Numbers ==
Pennant Number	From	To
N10	6 Dec 1914	1 Sep 1915
D21	1 Sep 1915	1 Jan 1918
D41	1 Jan 1918	13 Sep 1918
H73	13 Sep 1918	22 Oct 1920

== Bibliography ==
- Chesneau, Roger & Kolesnik, Eugene M., eds. (1979). Conway's All The World's Fighting Ships 1860–1905. London: Conway Maritime Press. ISBN 0-85177-133-5.
- Colledge, J. J.; Warlow, Ben (2006) [1969]. Ships of the Royal Navy: The Complete Record of All Fighting Ships of the Royal Navy from the 15th Century to the Present (3rd Rev ed.). London: Chatham Publishing. ISBN 978-1-86176-281-8. OCLC 67375475.
- Dittmar, F.J.; Colledge, J. J. (1972). British Warships 1914–1919. Shepperton, UK: Ian Allan. ISBN 0-7110-0380-7.
- Friedman, Norman (2009). British Destroyers: From Earliest Days to the Second World War. Barnsley, UK: Seaforth Publishing. ISBN 978-1-84832-049-9.
- Gardiner, Robert & Gray, Randal, eds. (1985). Conway's All The World's Fighting Ships 1906–1921. London: Conway Maritime Press. ISBN 0-85177-245-5.
- Manning, T. D. (1961). The British Destroyer. London: Putnam & Co. OCLC 6470051.
- March, Edgar J. (1966). British Destroyers: A History of Development, 1892–1953; Drawn by Admiralty Permission From Official Records & Returns, Ships' Covers & Building Plans. London: Seeley Service. OCLC 164893555.
