= Red House Museum and Gardens, Christchurch =

The Red House Museum and Gardens, Christchurch
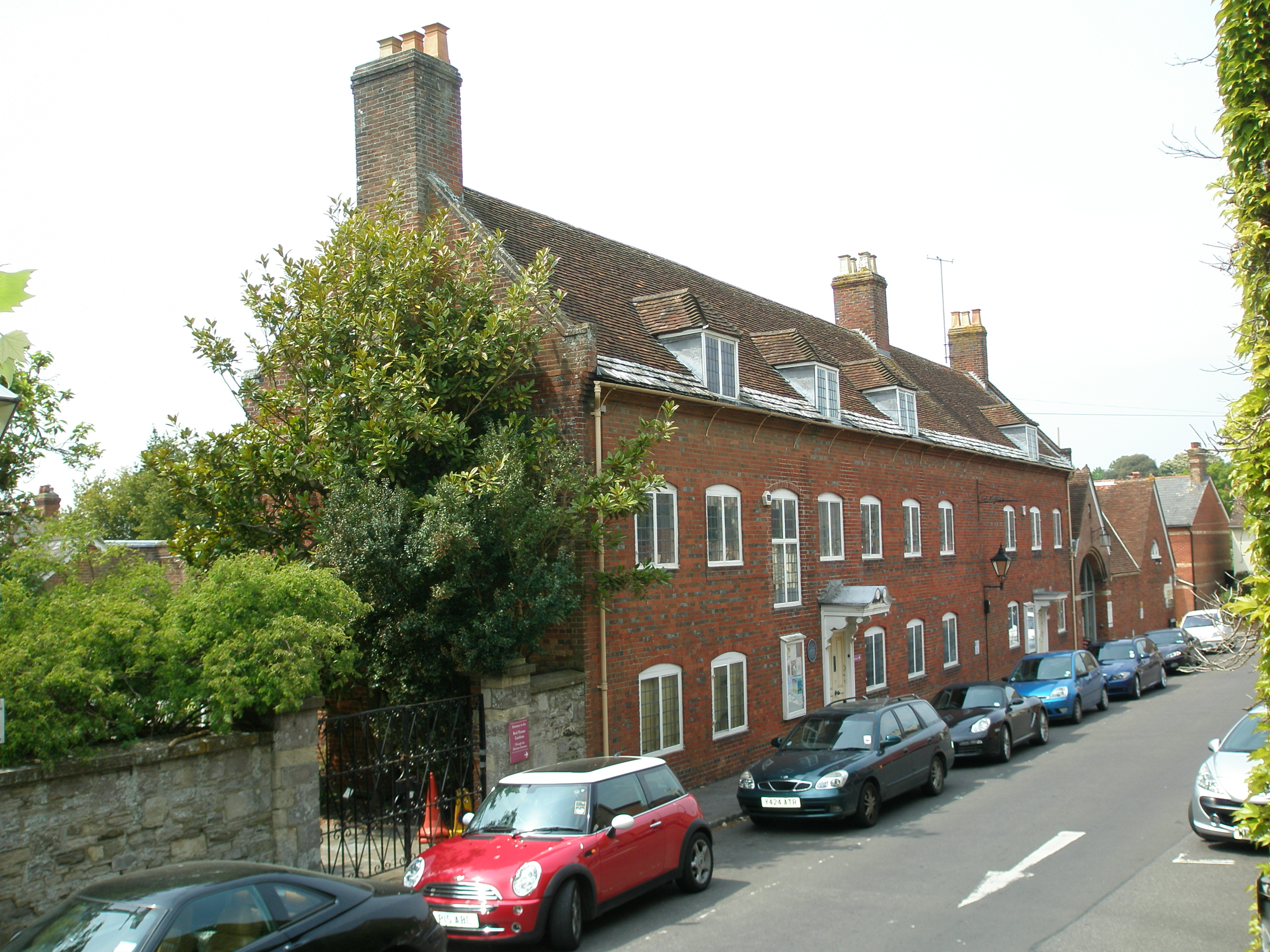

- Location in Dorset
- 50°43′57″N 1°46′35″W
- Location: Christchurch, Dorset, England
- OS grid reference: SZ 15890 92560

History
- Built: 1764

Site notes
- Governing body: Hampshire Cultural Trust
- Website: www.hampshireculturaltrust.org.uk

Listed Building – Grade II*
- Designated: 14 October 1953
- Reference no.: 1110072

The Red House Museum and Gardens is a museum of local history located in Christchurch, Dorset. The red-brick Georgian building was constructed in 1764 as the parish workhouse. Early in the 20th century it was acquired by local antiquarian Herbert Druitt and his collections provided the basis for a public museum that opened in 1951. The Red House is now a Grade II* listed building.

== History ==
In 1745 the churchwardens and Overseers of the Poor for Christchurch purchased a barn on the corner of Church Lane and Quay Road to provide "more comfortable support" for the town's numerous poor. In 1764 a purpose-built, red-brick poorhouse was constructed on the site, and this remained in use as the local workhouse until it was replaced in 1881 by a larger Union Workhouse that had been newly constructed in the fields to the north of the town. The last inmates to leave the increasingly decrepit Quay Road site were the "juvenile paupers", the children, who were finally relocated in 1886.

The dilapidated building was bought at auction by the Rev Thomas H Bush, the vicar of the nearby Priory Church, who named it the 'Red House'. The Rev Bush undertook many alterations and demolished some of the buildings. He erected stables on the site of the original barn, transformed the former exercise yards into gardens, and built a stone garden wall facing Quay Road where the women's ward had previously stood. The Red House remained a family home until the death of Rev Bush in 1909.

The Red House was then purchased by Matilda Druitt, the widow of solicitor James Druitt, whose home in the High Street is now Christchurch Library. After her death in 1916 the Red House passed to her solicitor son Herbert who, being a passionate local antiquarian and an outspoken champion of the town's history, used it as a storehouse for his vast collection of local documents, archaeological artefacts, and works of art. Although Herbert Druitt would open the Red House to visitors by private arrangement, his desire that it should become a permanent museum for the town remained unrealised before his death in 1943. The Red House passed to his sister Charlotte, who gifted the building to the town in 1947.

It took the trustees of the new museum three years to get the Red House and its overgrown garden to a state in which it could fulfil Charlotte's legacy and Herbert's wish. It was intended that the Red House should be more than just a museum and the executors of artist Graham Robertson donated £1,000 towards the cost of an art gallery. The opening ceremony of the Red House Museum was performed on Wednesday 30 May 1951 by Sir Donald Bailey, the inventor of the military Bailey Bridge, who lived locally. Because it was opened as part of the town's Festival of Britain celebrations, entry was free for the first two weeks, after which a sixpenny (6d) entry fee was introduced.

In 1971 the running of the Museum was taken over by Hampshire County Council. Following the changes to the county boundaries in 1974, when Christchurch was transferred from Hampshire to Dorset, Hampshire County Council retained control and set up a joint management agreement with Dorset County Council and Christchurch Borough Council.

== Present Day ==
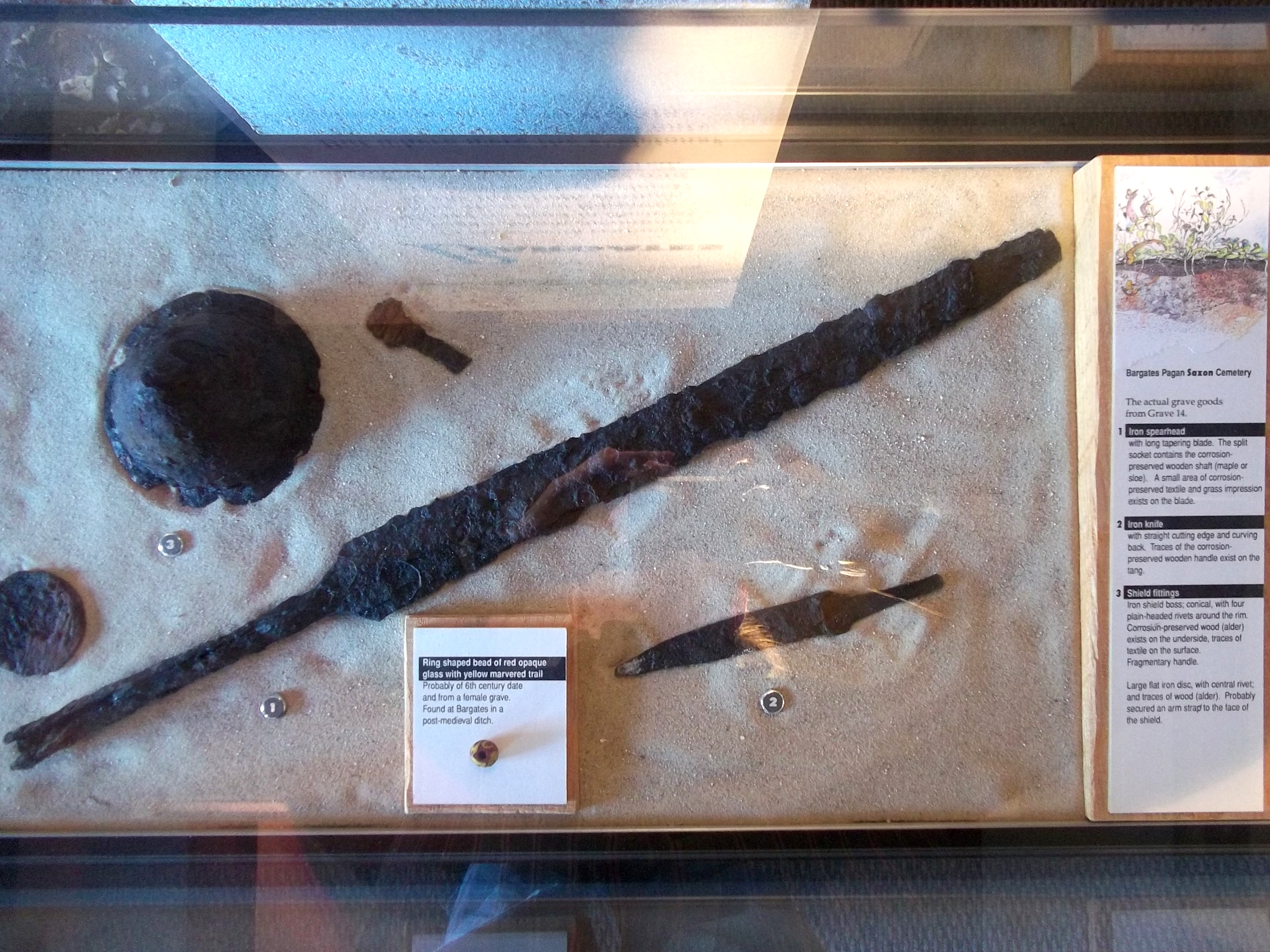
Saxon grave goods on display in the Red House Museum.

The Red House Museum is a free entry museum of local history. The ground floor features a Kitchen Gallery, Victorian Bygones Gallery, costume and fashion collections, and an exhibition of 1930s furniture by the noted Christchurch-based craftsman Arthur Romney Green. The Main Gallery in the former stables hosts regular temporary exhibitions.

On the first floor there are Archaeology Galleries covering significant local Bronze Age and Saxon burials and finds associated with Hengistbury Head. There is a Local History Resource Room with public access to several thousand historical photographs, local trade directories, electoral registers, and other research material. There is also an archive of historical documents that is viewable by appointment.

The gardens include a courtyard, Herb Garden, and larger South Garden.

The Red House Museum is presently owned by Hampshire County Council and operated by the Hampshire Cultural Trust. It receives funding from Dorset County Council and Christchurch Borough Council.
