= Lifeboats of the Titanic =

Lifesaving craft for RMS Titanic

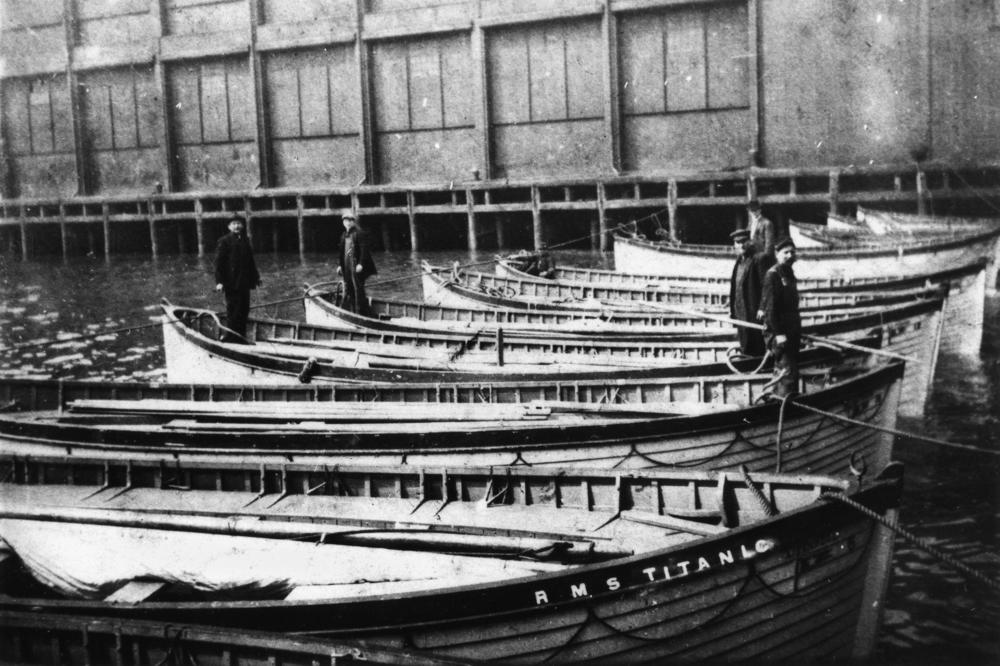
Titanic's wooden lifeboats in New York Harbor following the disaster. The word "R.M.S. Titanic" was etched onto the photograph as the lifeboats bore the name "S.S. Titanic" on a plaque mounted at the other end of the boat.

Lifeboats played a crucial role during the sinking of the Titanic on 14–15 April 1912. The ship had been supplied with 20 lifeboats that, by lifeboat capacity of that time, could accommodate 1,178 people, a little over half of the 2,207 on board the night it sank. Although the number of lifeboats was insufficient, Titanic in fact complied with maritime safety regulations at the time and even went over regulations by adding four collapsibles. The sinking highlighted that the regulations were outdated for passenger ships. Additionally, it was not anticipated that all passengers and crew would require evacuation at the same time; it was believed that Titanic could float long enough to allow a transfer of passengers and crew to a rescue vessel.

During the night of the sinking, 18 lifeboats were successfully launched over 2 hours and 40 minutes. Two others were in the process of being prepared to be launched when the ship began its final plunge; Collapsible Boat A was cut free and floated off the ship's partially submerged deck and Collapsible Lifeboat B floated away upside down minutes before the ship upended and sank.

The majority of the lifeboats only carried a fraction of their nominal capacity. There are many reasons behind half-filled lifeboats; these included the "women and children first" order, and apprehensions from the crew that the lifeboats or the ropes could give away under the weight as the boats appeared overloaded. Additionally, many passengers did not feel safe stepping in a lifeboat hovering 90 feet above the freezing ocean, having to be convinced, whilst others refused to leave behind family and friends.

As the boats rowed away from the ship, they were too far away for other passengers to reach, and most lifeboats did not return to the wreck due to a fear by its occupants of being swamped by drowning victims or being pulled down by suction of the sinking ship. Only Lifeboat No. 14 returned to the wreck site to retrieve survivors from the water; one other, No. 4, was close enough to the sinking to pick up some survivors who swam up to it. A total of 1,496 people died when the Titanic sank in the North Atlantic Ocean. Only 712 people survived in the lifeboats until later that morning when they were rescued by the RMS Carpathia. Thirteen of the lifeboats were also taken aboard and returned to the White Star Line at New York Harbour.

== Number and types of lifeboats ==
Boat layout infographic. The dots represent the occupancy and nominal capacity per boat.

Titanic had 20 lifeboats of three different types:

- 14 clinker-built wooden lifeboats, measuring 30 ft (9.1 m) long by 9 ft 1 in (2.77 m) wide by 4 ft (1.2 m) deep. Each had a capacity of 655.2 cubic feet (18.55 m^{3}) and had a nominal capacity of 65 people. (Note: The capacity of the lifeboats was measured by cubic feet, meaning how many people could fit within the available space. Under modern SOLAS rules, Titanic lifeboats would be allowed to carry 24 people and, with a minor breach, would allow for 34.) The rudders were made of elm – selected because it resisted splitting – and were 1.75 in (4.4 cm) thick. The exteriors of the boats were fitted with "grablines" for people in the water to hold on to. They were fitted with a variety of equipment to aid the occupants, comprising 10 oars, a sea anchor, two bailers, a painter (effectively a tow-rope) 150 feet (46 m) long, two boat-hooks, two 10 imperial gallons (45 L) tanks of fresh water, a mast and sail, a compass, a lantern and watertight metal provision tanks which contained biscuits. This equipment was not kept in the boats for fear of theft, but in locked boxes on the deck. In many cases, the equipment was not transferred to the boats when they were launched on 15 April and ended up going down with the ship. Blankets and a spare lifebelt could also be found in the boats.
- 2 wooden cutters intended to be used as emergency boats. They were kept ready to be launched quickly in the event of an incident requiring a boat in the water, such as a man overboard. The cutters were swung out at all times when the ship was underway, uncovered and with all their equipment, including a lighted oil lantern placed in the boat every evening. The cutters were of a similar design to the main lifeboats, but smaller, measuring 25 ft 2 in (7.67 m) long by about 7 ft (2.1 m) wide by 3 ft (0.91 m) deep. Their capacity was 322 cubic feet (9.1 m^{3}) and had a nominal capacity of 40 people. They were equipped similarly to the main lifeboats but with only one boathook, one water container, one bailer and six oars each.
- 4 "collapsible" Engelhardt lifeboats. These were effectively boat-shaped unsinkable rafts of kapok and cork, with heavy canvas sides that could be raised to form a boat. They measured 27 ft 5 in (8.36 m) long by 8 ft (2.4 m) wide by 3 ft (0.91 m) deep. Their capacity was 376.6 cubic feet (10.66 m^{3}) and had a nominal capacity of 47 people. The Engelhardts, built to a Danish design, were built by the boatbuilders McAlister & Son of Dumbarton, Scotland. Their equipment was similar to that of the cutters, but they had no mast or sail, had eight oars apiece and were steered using a steering oar rather than a rudder.

The main lifeboats and cutters were built by Harland and Wolff at Queen's Island, Belfast, at the same time that Titanic and her sister ship Olympic were constructed. They were designed for maximum seaworthiness, with a double-ended design (effectively having two bows). This reduced the risk that they would be flooded by a following sea (i.e., having waves breaking over the stern). If a lifeboat had to be beached, the design would also resist the incoming surf. Another safety feature consisted of airtight copper tanks within the boats' sides to provide extra buoyancy.

== Use and locations aboard Titanic ==
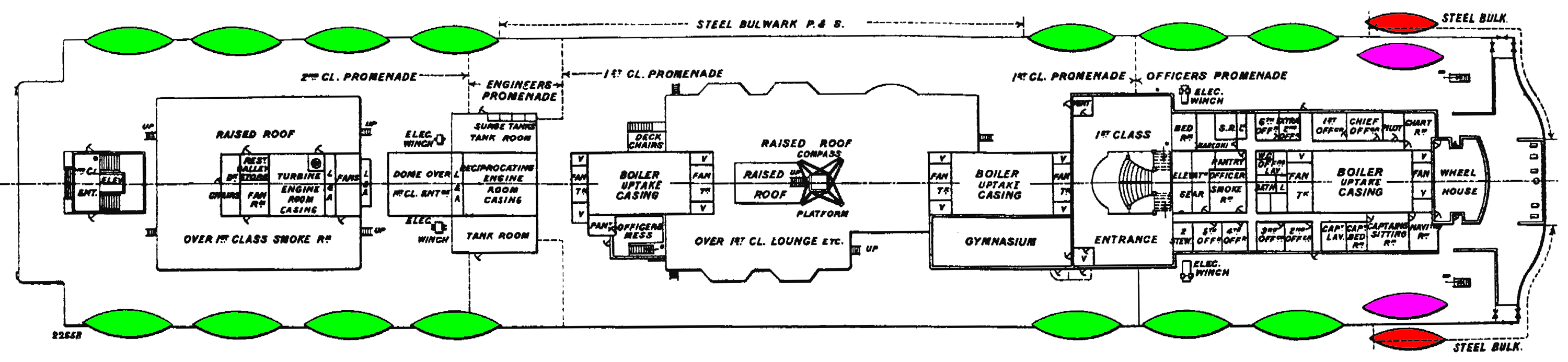
Plan of the Boat Deck of RMS Titanic showing the location of the lifeboats. The main lifeboats are marked in green, while the emergency cutters are highlighted in red. Two of the collapsible lifeboats are marked in purple. The other two (not on this diagram) were situated on the roof of the officers' quarters behind the wheelhouse.

All but two lifeboats were situated on the Boat Deck, the highest deck of Titanic. They were located on wooden chocks at the fore and aft parts of the Boat Deck, on both sides of the ship; two groups of three at the forward end, and two groups of four at the aft end. The two cutters were situated immediately aft of the bridge, one to port and the other to starboard. While Titanic was at sea, they were positioned outboard so that they could be lowered instantly in the event of an emergency, such as needing to rescue a person who had fallen overboard. The lifeboats were assigned odd numbers on the starboard side and even numbers on the port side, running from forward to aft, while the collapsible lifeboats were lettered A to D.

The collapsibles were stored in two places. Two of them were stowed on the deck in their collapsed state underneath the cutters, while the remaining two were situated on top of the officers' quarters. Despite the first two both being erected and launched without difficulty during Titanic's sinking, the other two both turned out to be very poorly located. They were both located 8 feet (2.4 m) off the deck and lowering them required a piece of equipment held in the boatswain's store in the bow. By the time this was realised, the bow was already well underwater, and the store was inaccessible. They were manhandled down and floated away freely as the deck flooded.

The lifeboats were intended to be launched from davits supplied by the Welin Davit & Engineering Company of London. All lifeboats but the collapsibles were slung from the davits, ready to be launched. The davits were of a highly efficient double-acting quadrant design, capable of being slung inboard (hanging over the deck) as well as outboard (hanging over the side) to pick up additional lifeboats. The davits aboard Titanic were capable of accommodating 64 lifeboats, though only 16 were actually fitted to them. The collapsibles were also intended to be launched via the davits. Each davit was doubled up, supporting the forward arm of one boat and the after arm of the next one along. A bitt and sheave was located at the keel of each davit to facilitate the lowering of boats, and the falls could be taken across the deck so that a number of men could work simultaneously on each boat and davit. They had to be lowered by hand, ideally by a team of between eight and ten men. Despite Titanic having a number of electric winches, they could only have been used to winch the lifeboats back out of the water.

== Lifeboat regulations ==
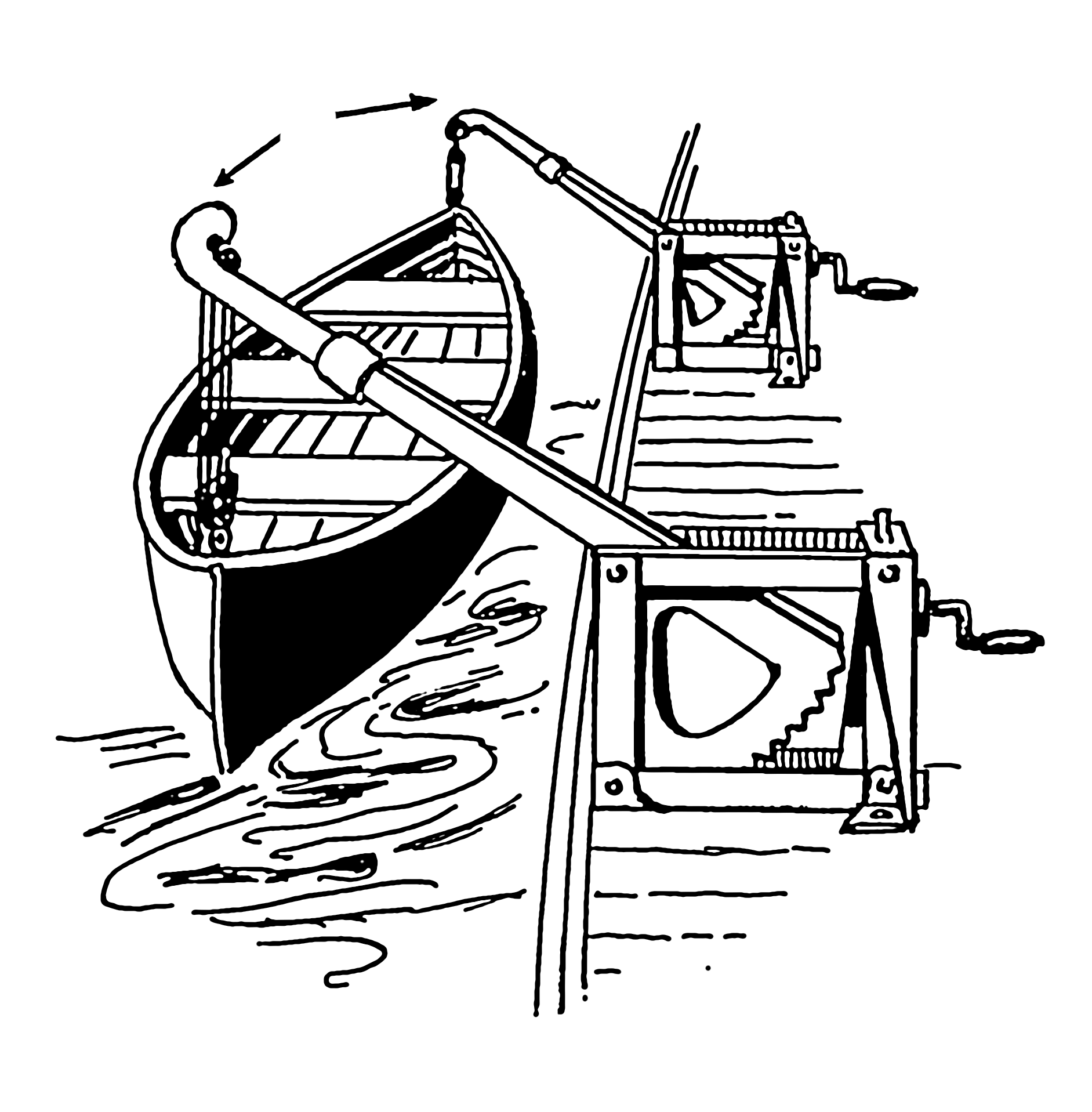
Boat suspended from Welin Quadrant davits

Titanic only had enough lifeboats to accommodate approximately a third of the ship's total capacity. Had every lifeboat been filled accordingly, they still could have only evacuated about 53% of those actually on board on the night of the sinking. The shortage of lifeboats was not due to a lack of space; Titanic had actually been designed to accommodate up to 64 lifeboats – nor was it because of cost, as the price of an extra 32 lifeboats (when it could have even held an extra 48) would only have been some $16,000, a tiny fraction of the $7.5 million that the company had spent on Titanic. The reason lay in a combination of outdated safety regulations.

In 1886, a committee of the British Board of Trade devised safety regulations for the merchant vessels of the time. These were updated with the passage of the Merchant Shipping Act 1894 (57 & 58 Vict. c. 60) and were modified subsequently, but by 1912, they had a fatal flaw – they had been intended to regulate vessels of up to 10,000 tons. At the time of the original regulations in the 1880s, the largest liners (the Cunard sisterships Etruria and Umbria) had a registered tonnage of just under 8,000 grt. The 1894 act made provision for vessels with a registered tonnage "greater than 10,000 tons" but at the time the legislation was drafted, the largest liner in service was then Cunard's Campania of 12,950 grt and with a maximum capacity of 2,500 passengers and crew. Between 1895 and 1910, the size and capacity of new liners entering service rapidly exceeded the scope of the act: Titanic had a gross register tonnage of 46,328 tons and a total capacity of over 3,300 people. Other ships were in a similar situation; 33 of the 39 British liners over 10,000 tons did not have enough lifeboats for all aboard, and the six that did were marginally over 10,000 tons. RMS Carmania was perhaps the worst of them, with only enough lifeboats for 29% of her occupants. Non-British ships, such as the German liner SS Amerika and the American liner SS St. Louis similarly had only enough lifeboat space for about 54–55% of those aboard.

The regulations required a vessel of 10,000 tons or more to carry 16 lifeboats with a total capacity of 9,625 cubic feet (272.5 m^{3}), sufficient for 960 people. Titanic actually carried four more lifeboats than was needed under the regulations. Her total lifeboat capacity was 11,327.9 cubic feet (320.77 m^{3}), which was theoretically capable of taking 1,178 people. The regulations required that lifeboats should measure between 16–30 feet (4.9–9.1 m), with a minimum capacity of 125 cubic feet (3.5 m^{3}) each. The cubic capacity divided by ten indicated the approximate number of people that could be carried safely in each lifeboat, and also dictated the size of the airtight buoyancy tanks incorporated into the boats' hulls, with each person corresponding to 1 cubic foot (0.028 m^{3}) of tank capacity.

In reality, the given capacity was quite nominal, as filling the lifeboats to their indicated capacity would have required some passengers to stand. This did in fact happen to some of the last lifeboats to leave Titanic; at the subsequent British enquiry, Titanic's Second Officer Charles Lightoller testified that the nominal capacity could only have applied "in absolutely smooth water, under the most favourable conditions." Harold Sanderson, Vice-President of the IMM, stated that the proper capacity, in typical Atlantic seaway capacity, would have been more like 40 people per boat. Additionally, there was also notable reluctance from passengers, some of whom did not wish to be separated from their families and others who felt the ship was safer than the wooden lifeboats.

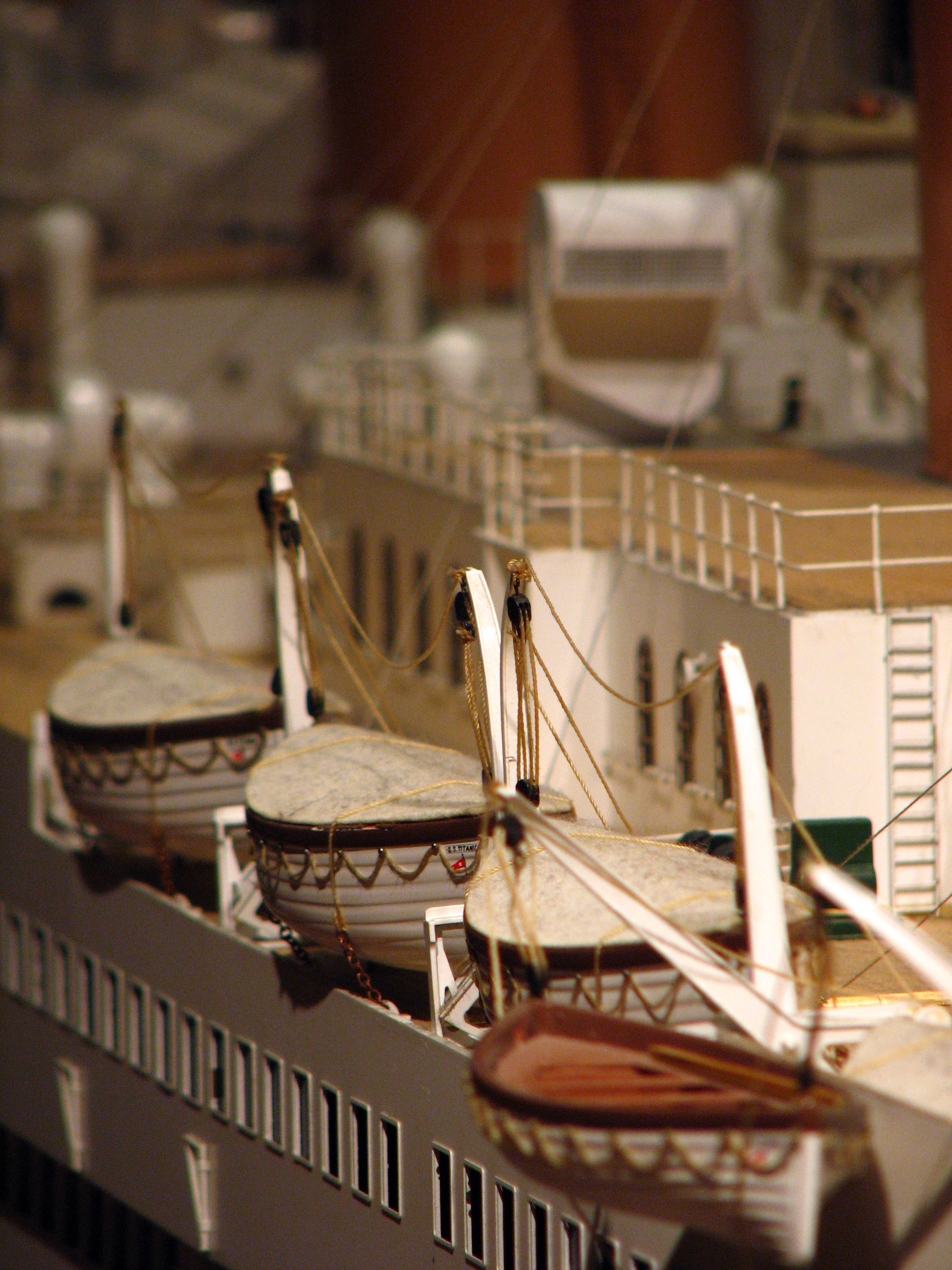
Arrangement of lifeboats on the forward part of the Boat Deck of Titanic, shown on a large-scale model of the ship

Titanic and her sister ships had been designed with the capability of carrying many more lifeboats than were actually provided, up to a total of 48. During the design stage, Alexander Carlisle, Harland & Wolff's chief draughtsman and general manager, submitted a plan to provide 48 lifeboats, with each davit holding three boats. He signed off on 16 lifeboats in May 1911, before the maiden voyage of Olympic. At the British inquiry, when why he signed off on the number despite his reservations, Carlisle replied, "I do not know why I did. I am not generally soft... But I must say I was very soft the day I signed that." When further pushed on whether he explicitly said there should be three times the number of lifeboats, Carlisle responded, "No, I would not say that I did."

Sailors and shipbuilders of the time had a low opinion of the usefulness of lifeboats in an emergency, as experience showed that small wooden vessels were likely to sink in rough seas (even if properly used and not overloaded), as illustrated by the SS Atlantic disaster, and therefore considered it more important to make a ship "unsinkable". Admiral Lord Charles Beresford, who served simultaneously as a high-ranking Royal Navy officer and Member of Parliament, told the House of Commons a month after the disaster:

Remember that on not more than one day in twelve all the year round can you lower a boat. With the roll of the ship the boats swing and will be smashed to smithereens against the side of the ship. The boats then should not be overdone ... It might be fairly supposed that had the Titanic floated for twelve hours all might have been saved.

British shipping lines never envisaged that all of the crew and passengers would have to be evacuated at once, particularly in cases such as Titanic and other larger liners which were considered practicably unsinkable. The lifeboats were instead intended to be used to transfer passengers off the ship and onto a nearby vessel providing assistance. While Titanic was under construction, an incident involving the White Star liner RMS Republic appeared to confirm this approach. Republic was involved in a collision with the Lloyd Italiano liner SS Florida in January 1909 and sank. Even though she did not have enough lifeboats for all passengers, they were all saved because the ship was able to stay afloat long enough for them to be ferried to ships coming to assist. This fact is what led to the harsh condemnation of Captain Stanley Lord of the SS Californian, who both American and British inquiries into the disaster felt could have saved many if not all of the passengers and crew had she heeded the Titanic's distress calls. In this scenario, Titanic's lifeboats would have been adequate to ferry the passengers to safety as planned. However, it is worth noting that the ferrying of passengers between two ships would have been a long, arduous process even under the best conditions. It took Carpathia well over four hours to pick up and account for all of Titanic's lifeboats in the morning after the disaster. During the sinking of the aforementioned Republic in 1909, it took nearly half a day to ferry all of her passengers to rescue ships, and during the sinking of the Italian liner Andrea Doria in 1956, it took nearly eight hours to ferry all her passengers to safety. Both liners sank at a much slower rate, roughly half a day, in contrast to Titanic, which sank slightly shy of three hours after her collision with the iceberg.

== Launch of the lifeboats ==
Lifeboat tally
Boat	Aboard	Boat	Aboard
2	18	1	12
4	30	3	32
6	24	5	36
8	27	7	28
10	57	9	40
12	41	11	50
14	40	13	55
16	52	15	66
B	28	A	13
D	20	C	43
Total:	337	Total:	375
	Total:	712	

It was not until about 12:40 a.m., an hour after Titanic struck the iceberg at 11:40 p.m. on 14 April, that the first lifeboat was lowered into the sea. The lifeboats were lowered in sequence, from the middle forward then aft, with First Officer William McMaster Murdoch, Third Officer Herbert Pitman and Fifth Officer Harold Lowe working on the starboard side, and Chief Officer Henry Tingle Wilde, Sixth Officer James Paul Moody and Second Officer Charles Lightoller working on the port side, with the assistance of Captain Smith. The collapsible boats were dealt with last, as they could not be launched until the forward davits were clear.

Smith had ordered his officers to put the "women and children in and lower away". However, Murdoch and Lightoller interpreted the evacuation order differently: Murdoch as women and children first, while Lightoller as women and children only. In fact Lightoller lowered lifeboats with empty seats if there were not any women and/or children waiting to board at all, while Murdoch only allowed a limited number of men to board if all the nearby women and children had already embarked. This had a significant effect on the survival rates of the men aboard Titanic, whose chances of survival came to depend on which side of the ship they tried to find lifeboat seats.

Two contemporary estimates were given for the number of occupants in each lifeboat, one by the British inquiry that followed the disaster, and one by survivor Archibald Gracie, who obtained accounts and data from other survivors. However, the figures given–854 persons and 795 persons respectively–far exceed the confirmed number of 712 survivors, due to confusion and misreporting. Some occupants were transferred between lifeboats before being picked up by RMS Carpathia. More recent research has helped to produce estimates of the number of occupants that are closer to the total number of survivors rescued by Carpathia.

=== Lifeboat 7 (starboard) ===
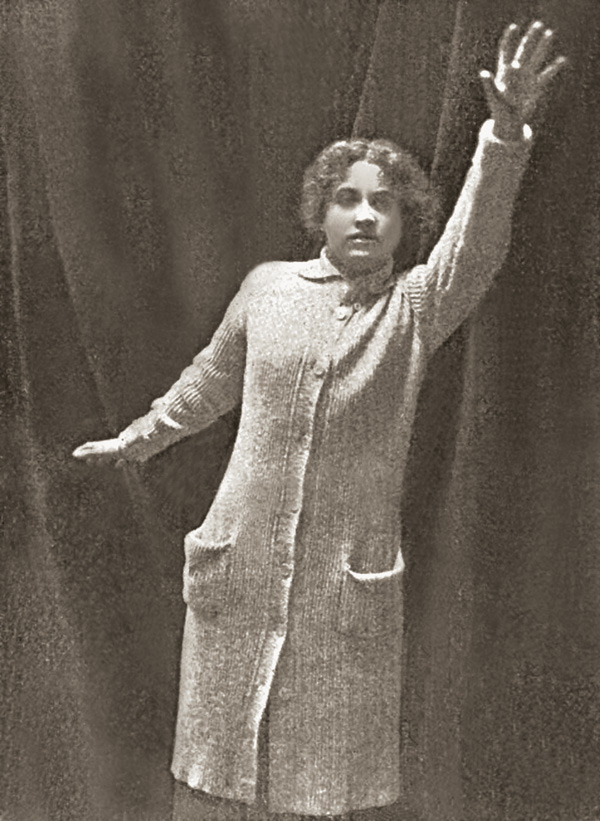
Dorothy Gibson in a promotional photo for Saved From the Titanic (1912), wearing the clothes she wore the night of the sinking

Lifeboat 7 was the first lifeboat to be launched at about 12:45 a.m., under the supervision of First Officer Murdoch, supported by Fifth Officer Lowe. It had a capacity of 65 people but was lowered with only 28 estimated people aboard. The two officers had tried for some minutes to encourage passengers to board but they were reluctant to do so. Later testimony at the U.S. Senate inquiry into the disaster stated the ship's officers were worried the lifeboats were at risk of buckling and breaking apart if they were lowered while fully loaded, or that the falls could fail and spill the passengers over. Edward Wilding, one of the chief architects of Titanic, testified that the lifeboats had been tested with the weight equivalent to that of 70 men but also that noted that the results of such tests were not passed on to the crew.

Among the occupants of Lifeboat 7 were:

- Dorothy Gibson, American silent film actress who starred in Saved from the Titanic (1912), the first motion picture produced about the disaster
- Pauline Caroline Boesen, Gibson's mother
- Frederic Kimber Seward, prominent New York corporate lawyer
- William T. Sloper, Connecticut banker, who was falsely accused of dressing as a woman to get into the lifeboat
- Archie Jewell, Lookout
- Margaret Hays, New York heiress, who brought her Pomeranian, Bebe, with her
- Alfred Nourney, traveling under the pseudonym Baron Alfred von Drachstedt
- Dickinson Bishop, businessman (who was also falsely accused of dressing as a woman that night) and his new wife Helen
- Antoinette Flegenheim, German socialite
- John Pillsbury Snyder, banker, and his new wife Nelle

The lifeboat was launched without its plug, causing water to leak into the bottom of the boat. As Gibson later put it, "this was remedied by volunteer contributions from the lingerie of the women and the garments of men." Those aboard had to sit for hours with their feet soaking in ice-cold water. When Titanic went down at 2:20 a.m., the noise of hundreds of people screaming for help was heard by the lifeboat's occupants, a sound that Gibson said would "remain in my memory until the day I die." George Hogg, a Titanic lookout manning the boat, wanted to turn back to pick up some of those in the water but was shouted down by the boat's occupants. They drifted for some time until they came within reach of Lifeboat 5. The officer in charge of the latter decided to transfer a number of survivors from his boat, which he thought was overcrowded, into Lifeboat 7. The two boats were lashed together for the rest of the night until they separated to meet the RMS Carpathia.

=== Lifeboat 5 (starboard) ===
Murdoch and Lowe were joined by Third Officer Pitman and the White Star Line's chairman J. Bruce Ismay to help them lower Lifeboat 5, which left at 12:43 a.m. The boat was loaded primarily with women and children. Charles Stengel, who boarded a later boat, remembered that 'approximately thirty-six' out of 65 seats were occupied.

Most of those on deck were unaware of the seriousness of their situation and did not even attempt to board. John Jacob Astor, who was subsequently among the victims of the disaster, remarked: "We are safer on board the ship than in that little boat." Ismay disagreed; still wearing slippers and pajamas, he urged Pitman to begin loading the boat with women and children. Pitman, who did not recognise Ismay, responded with: "I await the Captain's orders," and went to the captain for the approval. Ismay returned a short time later to urge a stewardess to board, which she did. Pitman entered on Murdoch's orders. Later on the ocean, passenger Henry Frauenthal would learn from Pitman that Titanic had collided with an iceberg, and that within half an hour, the lifeboat would return to the ship.

The occupants included:

- Karl Behr, American tennis star and banker, along with his future fiancée and her parents Sallie and Richard Beckwith
- Third Officer Herbert Pitman, put in charge of the boat by Murdoch.
- Quartermaster Alfred John Olliver
- Eleanor Cassebeer
- Annie Stengel
- Spencer Victor Silverthorne
- Norman and Bertha Chambers
- Edwin and Susan Kimball
- Samuel and Nella Goldenberg
- Ruth Dodge and her son Washington Jr. ('Bobo'), who was the first child to enter a lifeboat.
- Henry and Clara Frauenthal with his brother Isaac
- Elmer Taylor
- Helen Ostby
- Maximilian Fröhlicher-Stehli and daughter Marguerite

The boat's progress down the side of the ship was slow and difficult. The pulleys were covered in fresh paint and the lowering ropes were stiff, causing them to stick repeatedly as the boat was lowered in jerks towards the water. One of those watching the boat being lowered, Washington Dodge, felt "overwhelmed with doubts" that he might be subjecting his wife and son to greater danger aboard the boat than if they had remained on Titanic. Ismay, helping passengers into the lifeboats, got a little "excited" and spurred those lowering the boat to greater urgency by calling out repeatedly: "Lower away!" This resulted in Lowe, who did not recognise Ismay and was personally helping lower the boat with one of the davit falls, losing his temper: "If you'll get the hell out of the way, I'll be able to do something! You want me to lower away quickly? You'll have me drown the lot of them!" Ismay calmed down and returned to finding and helping passengers. In the end, the boat was launched safely.

After Titanic sank, several of those aboard Lifeboat 5 were transferred to Lifeboat 7, leaving about 30 on board by the time Lifeboat 5 reached Carpathia. Herbert Pitman wanted to return to the scene of the sinking to pick up swimmers in the water and announced: "Now men, we will pull toward the wreck!" The women on board protested, one begging a steward: "Appeal to the officer not to go back! Why should we lose all our lives in a useless attempt to save others from the ship?" Pitman gave in to the protests. He later broke down at the U.S. Senate inquiry when asked about the cries from the water and said, "I would rather you would not speak of it."

The occupants of the lifeboat endured a freezing night. Mrs. Dodge was particularly badly affected by the cold but was helped by Quartermaster Alfred Olliver, who gave her his socks: "I assure you, ma'am, they are perfectly clean. I just put them on this morning." At about 6:00 a.m., they were rescued by Carpathia.

=== Lifeboat 3 (starboard) ===
Lifeboat 3 was launched at 1:00 a.m. by Murdoch and Lowe with 32 estimated people on board, with Able Seaman George Moore put in charge by Murdoch.

Railroad manager Charles Melville Hays saw his wife, Clara (along with her maid) and his daughter Orian Davidson into Lifeboat 3 and then retreated, making no attempt to board any of the remaining lifeboats.

The occupants included:

- Henry S. Harper, a member of a New York City publishing firm, who also brought into the boat his Pekinese dog Sun Yat Sen, along with his wife Myra and their manservant.
- Charlotte Wardle Cardeza and her son Thomas
- Albert and Vera Dick
- Frederic and Margaretta Spedden with their six-year-old son Robert

Eleven crewmen were among the occupants of this boat. It suffered the same problems with lowering that Lifeboat 7 had encountered, with the lifeboat descending in fits and starts as the lowering ropes repeatedly stuck in the pulleys, but eventually reached the water safely. After Titanic sank, the lifeboat drifted, while the bored women passengers passed the time by arguing with each other over minor annoyances. The occupants had a long wait in freezing conditions and were not rescued until about 7.30 a.m. when their boat reached Carpathia.

=== Lifeboat 8 (port) ===
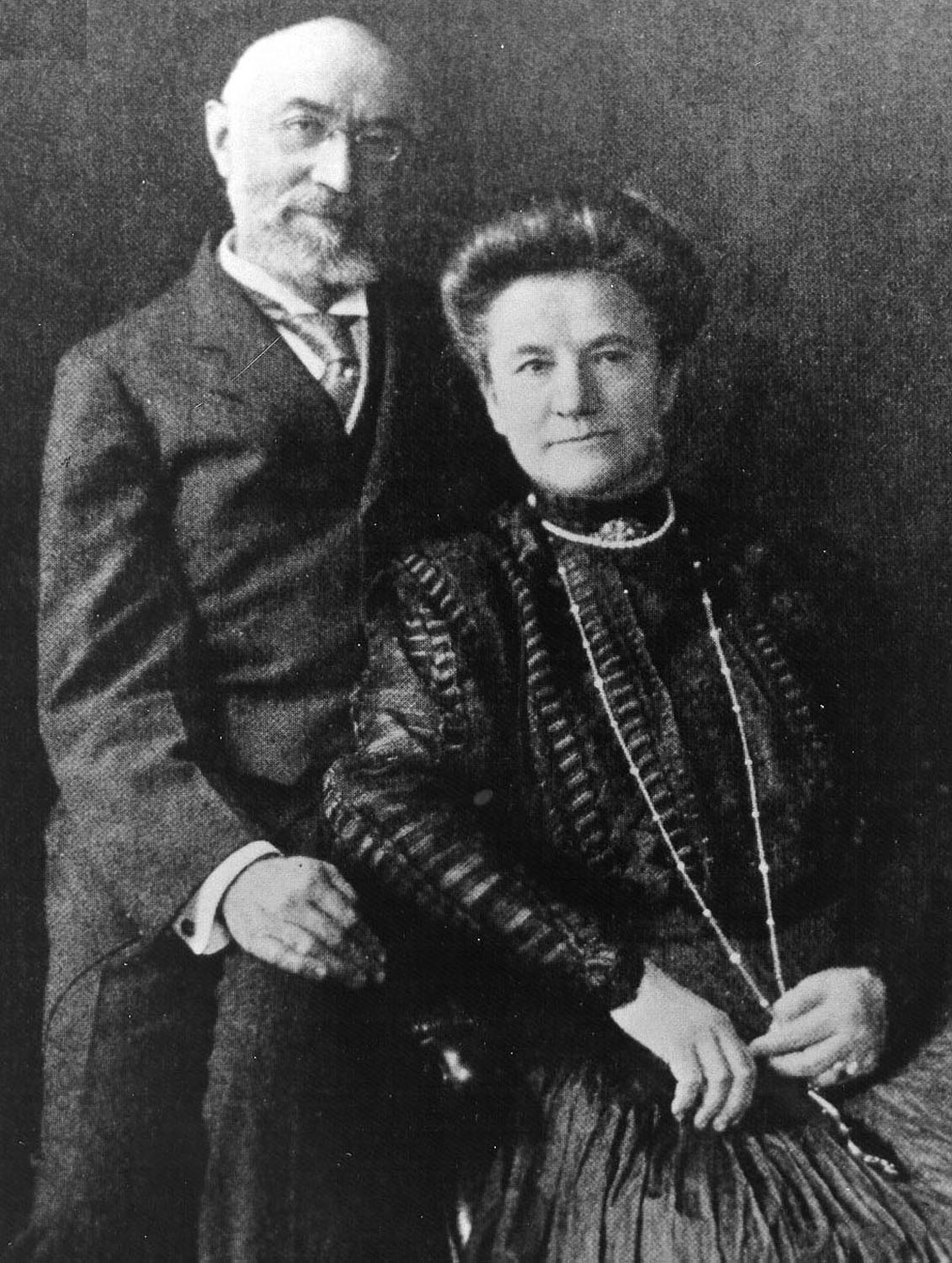
Isidor and Ida Straus, who refused to board a lifeboat while there were younger people still waiting to board

Lifeboat 8 was loaded with 27 estimated people under the supervision of Captain Smith and Chief Officer Wilde, being launched at 1:10 a.m. Lifeboat 8 was the first lifeboat on the port side to be lowered. Ida Straus, wife of New York merchant Isidor Straus, was asked to join a group of people preparing to board but refused, saying, "I will not be separated from my husband. As we have lived, so will we die – together." The 67-year-old Isidor likewise refused an offer to board on account of his age, saying: "I do not wish any distinction in my favor which is not granted to others." They were last seen alive on deck arm in arm. Major Archibald Butt – military aide to US President William Howard Taft – escorted Marie Young to the boat. She later recalled that Butt "wrapped blankets about me and tucked me in as carefully as if we were going on a motor ride." He wished her farewell and good luck, asking her to "remember me to the folks back home." Other single women were brought to the boats by men who had earlier offered their services to "unprotected ladies", as the conventions of the era dictated.

The occupants of Lifeboat 8 numbered around 27 people, including:

- Ellen Bird, personal maid of the Strauses
- Noëlle, Countess of Rothes, who took charge of the lifeboat's tiller and helped row, along with her maid and her husband's cousin, Gladys Cherry
- Marie Grice Young, former music teacher to the children of President Theodore Roosevelt and Mrs. Roosevelt
- Ella Holmes White
- Thomas William Jones, in charge of the lifeboat.

After Titanic sank, Seaman Thomas William Jones, in command of the boat, suggested going back to save some of those in the water. Only three passengers agreed; the rest refused, fearing that the boat would be capsized by desperate swimmers. Jones acquiesced, but told them: "Ladies, if any of us are saved, remember I wanted to go back. I would rather drown with them than leave them." The passengers' conduct during the subsequent hours presented some striking contrasts. Lady Rothes – who had been one of the few passengers to support a rescue attempt – took charge of the tiller and put others to work at the oars. Her conduct was later complimented by Jones, who called her "more of a man than any we had aboard" and gave her the lifeboat's numeral 8, in a frame, as a keepsake. In fact, when Walter Lord, author of A Night to Remember, interviewed the Countess and Seaman Jones in 1954, he discovered their mutual admiration had led to a lifelong correspondence. By contrast, Ella White was so annoyed that the stewards in Lifeboat 8 were smoking cigarettes that she complained about it at the US Senate inquiry into the disaster; she was particularly indignant that one of the ship's crewmen had said to another during the night: "If you don't stop talking through that hole in your face, there will be one less in the boat!"

The occupants of Lifeboat 8 spent the night rowing towards what they thought were the lights of a ship on the horizon but turned around at daybreak when Carpathia actually arrived on the scene from the opposite direction. They had travelled further from the scene than any other lifeboat and had a long row back; It was not until 7:30 a.m. that they were picked up.

=== Emergency Boat 1 (starboard) ===
Emergency Boat 1 was the first Emergency Lifeboat to be launched at 1:10 a.m. under the supervision of Murdoch and Lowe. It became one of the most controversial episodes in the aftermath of the disaster, both because the craft only contained 12 people and because of the alleged misconduct of two of its occupants, Sir Cosmo Duff-Gordon and his wife, Lucy, Lady Duff-Gordon, famous as the dress designer "Lucile" of London, Paris and New York. The boat was one of Titanic's two emergency cutters with a capacity of 40. Of the twelve people aboard, seven were crewmen and the remaining five were First-Class passengers.

Its composition was not, however, a departure from Murdoch's interpretation of the "women and children first" directive. He had already allowed several married couples and single men to board lifeboats if there were no women around. Cosmo Duff-Gordon had been standing on deck with his wife and her secretary, Laura Mabel Francatelli, watching the launching of three other lifeboats when, as Lifeboat 1 was being prepared, he asked Murdoch if his party could board. Murdoch assented and also allowed two Americans, Abram Salomon and Charles E. H. Stengel, to enter. He then instructed a group of six stokers to board, along with Lookout George Symons whom he placed in charge of the boat. With nobody else around the boat, due in part because of its location at the bridge, he gave the order to lower away.

The census conducted on the cutters by Harland & Wolff concluded that Lifeboat 1 had room for about another 28 passengers. However, Lifeboat 1 would not return to rescue those in the water after the Titanic sank. Fireman Charles Hendrickson claimed he told his boat mates: "It's up to us to go back and pick up anyone in the water!" but found no support. At least three other crew members, as well as the Duff-Gordons, Salomon and Stengel, denied hearing any suggestion to go back or opposing any proposition to do so. In the media later, the passengers – the Duff-Gordons in particular – were widely criticised for what was interpreted as their callousness in the face of the disaster. For instance, as Titanic sank, Lady Duff-Gordon reportedly commented to her secretary: "There is your beautiful nightdress gone." Fireman Pusey replied that she should not worry about losing her belongings because she could buy more. Pusey mentioned that the crew had lost all their kit and that their pay stopped from the moment of the sinking. Cosmo responded: "Very well, I will give you a fiver each to start a new kit!" Aboard the rescue ship Carpathia, he did as he promised, presenting each of the seven crewmen in his lifeboat a cheque for £5.

When this act was made public, it was interpreted by much of the press as a bribe to prevent the crew from returning to the scene of the sinking to rescue others. The British Board of Trade's official inquiry into the disaster investigated the allegation but found the charge of bribery to be false. Even so, the publicity injured Cosmo's reputation. A photograph of the occupants of Lifeboat 1 was taken aboard the Carpathia. Lady Duff-Gordon had consented to a request from a Carpathia passenger, Dr. Frank Hamlin Blackmarr, to take the image, but the sight of some of the crew posing in their lifejackets disturbed some fellow survivors who subsequently complained about the incident.

=== Lifeboat 6 (port) ===
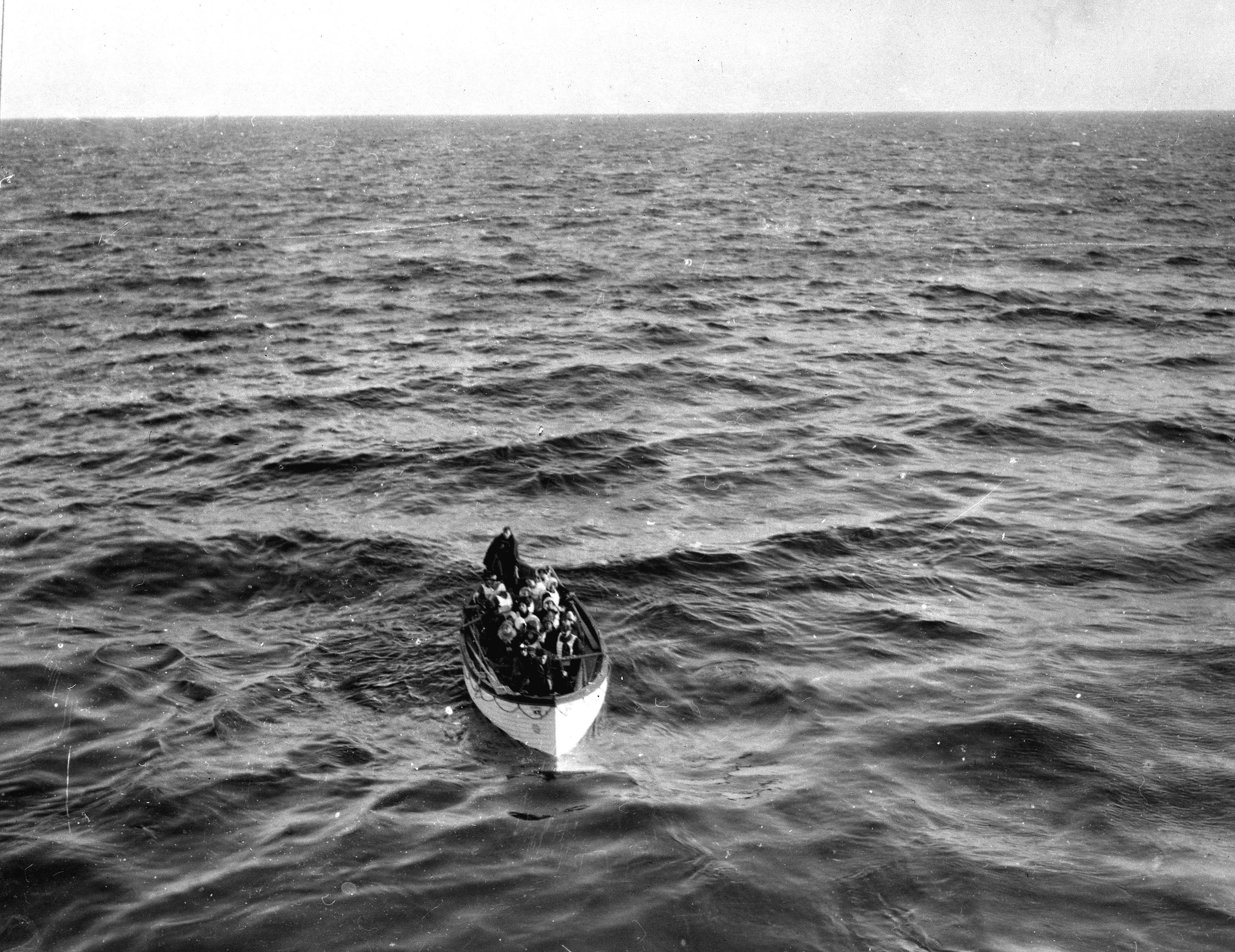
Lifeboat 6 rowing towards RMS Carpathia on April 15, 1912

Smith and Second Officer Lightoller launched Lifeboat 6 at 12:55 a.m.; it was photographed as it approached Carpathia, revealing it to have about 24 people aboard, though it had a capacity of 65. Denver millionaire Margaret "Molly" Brown was among Lifeboat 6's most prominent occupants, along with Washington, D.C. writer and feminist Helen Churchill Candee, and English suffragettes, Elsie Bowerman and her mother Mrs. Edith Chibnall. Brown did not board voluntarily but was picked up by a crewman and dropped bodily into the boat as it was being lowered. Quartermaster Robert Hichens was placed in charge of the craft along with lookout Frederick Fleet. While being lowered, pleas from women in the boat for additional oarsmen forced Lightoller to solicit the crowd on deck for anyone who had sailing experience. Major Arthur Peuchen of the Royal Canadian Yacht Club volunteered, shinnying down the falls (ropes) into the boat. Peuchen was the only adult male passenger whom Second Officer Lightoller permitted to board a lifeboat.

Relations among the occupants of Lifeboat 6 were strained throughout the night. Hichens apparently resented Peuchen's presence, perhaps fearing the Major would pull rank and take charge. The two men quarreled, and Hichens refused Peuchen's request that he assists him at the oars, since there was only one other man (Fleet) rowing.

When the Titanic sank, Peuchen, Brown and others urged Hichens to return to rescue people struggling in the water. Hichens refused, even ordering the men at the oars to stop rowing altogether. "There's no use going back", he called out. "There's only a lot of stiffs out there", adding: "It's our lives now, not theirs." The cries for help soon died. Brown now asked Hichens to let the women row to help keep them warm. When he balked, Brown ignored him and started passing out oars anyway. He protested and swore at her, and at one point moved to physically stop her. She told him to stay put or she would throw him overboard. Others joined in to back her up, telling Hichens to keep quiet. But he continued swearing, shocking a stoker (transferred from Lifeboat 16) who finally asked him: "Don't you know you're talking to a lady?" Taking an oar herself, Brown organised the other women in shifts, two to an oar. When her heroic actions were published in the press, she became known as the "Unsinkable Molly Brown". Brown's leadership was supported by Helen Candee, who herself assisted in the rowing despite her broken ankle, sustained when she fell into the boat while boarding.

After the Titanic sank, Lifeboat 6 eventually tied up with Lifeboat 16. It was one of the last to reach Carpathia, coming alongside at 8:00 a.m. Mrs. Elizabeth Rothschild had her Pomeranian with her in the lifeboat. Initially, crew members of the Carpathia refused to take the dog aboard, but Mrs. Rothschild would not board the rescue ship without it. The Pomeranian was one of only three dogs to survive the disaster.

- Elsie Edith Bowerman and her mother Mrs. E. M. Chibnall
- Margaret Brown
- Helen Churchill Candee, noted American author
- Lookout Frederick Fleet, who had first sighted the iceberg
- Arthur Godfrey Peuchen, Toronto chemical manufacturer
- Mary Eloise Smith

=== Lifeboat 16 (port) ===
Chief Officer Wilde and Sixth Officer Moody supervised the launching of Lifeboat 16 at about 1:25 a.m. 53 people are believed to have been on board by the time it reached Carpathia; Most of those aboard were said to be women and children from Second and Third Class. Master-at-arms Joseph Henry Bailey was put in charge of the lifeboat along with Seamen Ernest Archer and James Forward.

Very few testimonies mention Lifeboat 16, which did not interact much with the other boats (but encountered Lifeboat 6 and gave them a fireman for rowing). Third Class passenger Carla Andersen-Jensen, who was most likely in Lifeboat 16, gave a detailed depiction of the disaster:

[...] We were now up on the deck and there were not much commotion, we had hit an iceberg, but everyone felt the ship would stay afloat. The ship was fully lit and there was music in the 1st class saloon. There were no panic even when the lifeboats were launched, no one seem to push to get into them and the women and children went into the boats first. When the lifeboat I got into rowed away from Titanic the orchestra was still playing. One said later it was the psalm Nearer My God to Thee [...] Then the catastrophe happened. Before anyone expected it. With fright we heard an incredible crash and it was as if a scream from 1,000 voices came from the lit giant ship, when it broke in two and both parts rose into the sky and sank. We sat like stone figures and saw it all happen. What was even worse than the screams were the deadly silence that came after.....it was frightful. We could not handle anything when we were taken onboard the freighter [...]. We were put in the hold or where there was room, we were well taken care of and got food and warm drinks. However the hours on board were frightful, some women were just sitting apathetically and staring out into the air and others were wandering around screaming their men's names. Some were lying around just crying and others could not handle the event and several times we saw canvas-covered bodies being lowered over the side.

Among the occupants of the lifeboat were:

- Stewardess Violet Constance Jessop, who survived the accidents that befell all of the Olympic-class liners: the collision of Olympic with HMS Hawke in 1911, the sinking of Titanic in 1912, and that of Britannic in 1916.
- Margaret Mannion, along with her best friend Ellen Mockler
- Stewardess Evelyn Marsden

=== Lifeboat 14 (port) ===
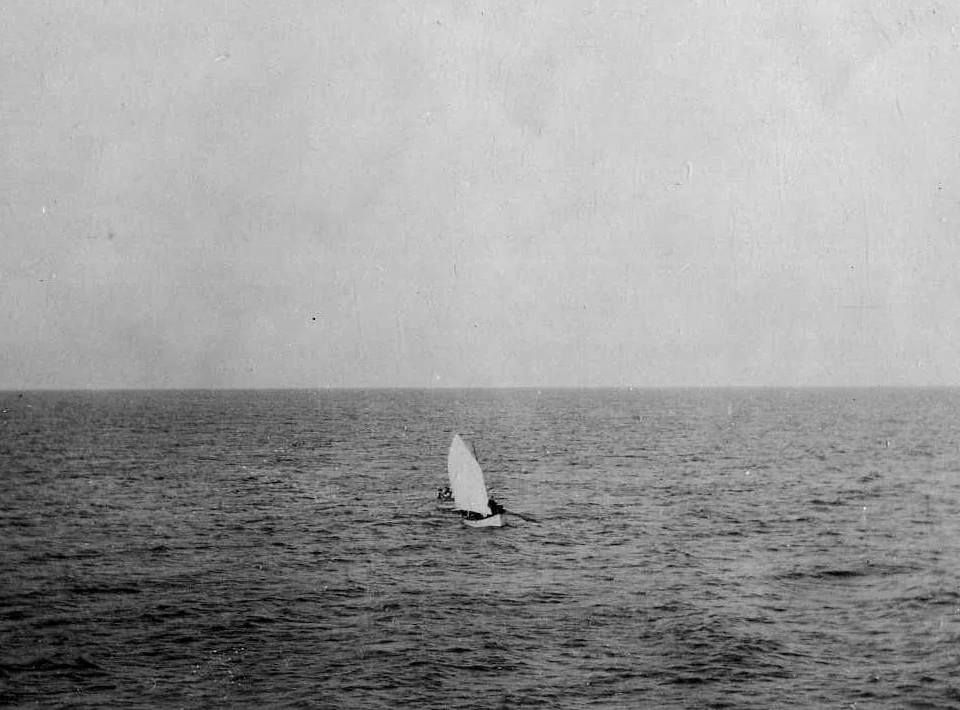
Lifeboat No. 14, under sail, approaching the RMS Carpathia.

40 passengers were aboard Lifeboat 14, with Wilde and Lowe generally supervising its launch. By the time it was launched at about 1:30 a.m., Titanic was well down in the water. Lowe fired three shots from his revolver to warn off a crowd of passengers pressing up against the rails. As the boat reached the water, one of the falls got twisted, leaving the stern of it high up and out of the water. Lowe cut the falls off and the boat fell even with the water.

The boat reached the water safely, with Lowe himself aboard to take charge. He stayed near the ship in order to be able to return to the wreck. However, Lowe felt that Boat 14 was quite full and thought that taking a boat full of passengers back to the wrecksite immediately after the ship foundered would have been "suicidal" and that "it would be no good me going back with a load of people." Hailing nearby lifeboats – Lifeboats 4, 10, 12 and Collapsible Boat D – he had them tied together and began to transfer Lifeboat 14's passengers out of it.

During the transfer, Lowe came across a male passenger who was trying to sneak by him wearing a shawl whom he "pitched" into another lifeboat. This was likely Daniel Buckley, a third class passenger from Irish immigrant who admitted to his family that he snuck into a lifeboat. Buckley later testified to the Senate inquiry into the sinking that he had helped put women and children in at least five lifeboats when he made a quick decision to jump in with a number of males; he recounted that when two officers ordered the men to get out, a female passenger took pity on him, threw a shawl over him and pushed him down to hide him in the bottom of the boat. Buckley later joined the 69th Infantry Regiment of the US Army during World War I and was killed in action on 15 October 1918 during the Meuse–Argonne offensive.

With the transfer complete, Lowe assembled a crew of volunteers, and took his boat back to the scene of the sinking to try and find survivors. By the time Lowe's boat reached the scene of the sinking, the sea was filled with the bodies of hundreds of people who had died of hypothermia. Four men were rescued from the wrecksite: Steward Harold Phillimore, First-Class passenger William Fisher Hoyt, Third-Class passenger Fang Lang and a fourth unknown person. However, the crew realised they had waited too long since most were already dead or dying. Hoyt died in the boat, while the other three survived.

After leaving the wrecksite, Lowe, an experienced boatsman, set up the lifeboat's mast and sail for better speed and maneuverability, making it the only lifeboat to avail of sail power. He spotted Collapsible Boat D which was struggling to row and took her in tow. After a while, Lowe spotted Collapsible Boat A at a distance, which was swamped and had only twelve survivors left of the thirty who originally took refuge on her. Lowe sailed down to her and brought another twelve people aboard Lifeboat 14. He left behind three bodies in the collapsible which was found a few weeks later by the RMS Oceanic. The boat rendezvoused with Carpathia at about 7:15 a.m.

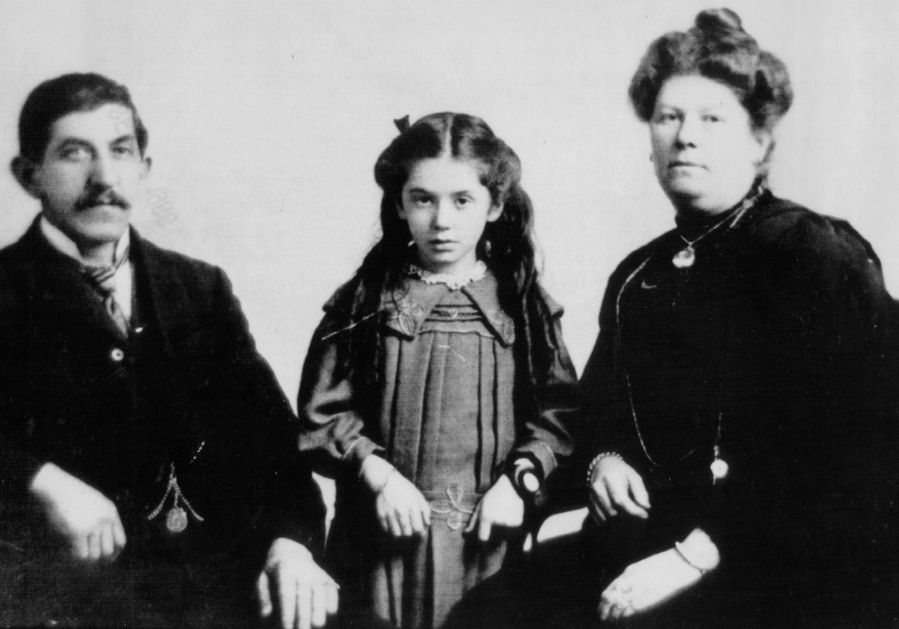
Hart Family (from left to right) Benjamin, Eva and Esther Hart. Benjamin did not survive the sinking

Among the survivors in Lifeboat 14 were:

- Harold Godfrey Lowe (in charge)
- Charles Williams, racquets player
- Edith Eileen Brown (age 15) and her mother, Elizabeth
- Marjorie Collyer (age 8) and her mother, Charlotte
- Eva Hart (age 7) and her mother, Esther

=== Lifeboat 12 (port) ===
Chief Officer Wilde and Second Officer Lightoller lowered Lifeboat 12 at 1:35 a.m., the same time as Lifeboat 9. It was first manned only by Able Seaman Frederick Clench and was subsequently put in the charge of Able Seaman John Poingdestre. A male passenger jumped into the boat as it was lowered past B Deck. Difficulty was encountered in unhooking the boat from the falls, requiring Poingdestre to use a knife to cut through the ropes.

Several passengers from other boats were transferred into Lifeboat 12 after the sinking. Lifeboat 12 encountered Lifeboats 4, 10, 14 and Collapsible D in sea. Fifth Officer Lowe in charge of Lifeboat 14 distributed 10 or 12 additional survivors to Lifeboat 12 (in order to go back himself with some seamen to the wreckage to see if he could save anyone). Lifeboat 12 probably received also 2 or 3 crew from Collapsible D to get to 40–45 people at this time. After that, Lifeboat 12 together with Lifeboat 4 heard Second Officer Lightoller's whistle (standing with some survivors on overturned Collapsible B), they rowed off and rescued about 16 or so people standing on the bottom of overturned Collapsible B. Lifeboat 12 passed then under the command of Second Officer Lightoller. It was heavily overloaded by the time with at least between 60 and 70 people aboard. It was the last lifeboat to be picked up by Carpathia, at about 8:30 a.m.

The occupants of Lifeboat 12 numbered initially (prior to transfer of passengers and rescue operation) around 28–30 people, mainly Second class passengers and crew.

=== Lifeboat 9 (starboard) ===
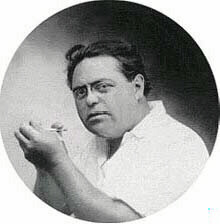
Jacques Futrelle urged his wife to enter Boat 9 but did not find a lifeboat for himself and died in the sinking

The lowering of Lifeboat 9 at 1:20 a.m., at the same time as Lifeboat 12, carried 40 passengers aboard and was supervised by Murdoch, Moody and Purser Hugh McElroy. Boatswain's Mate Albert Hames was put in charge with Able Seaman George McGough at the tiller. Most passengers were women, with two or three men who entered when no more women came forward. One elderly woman refused to board, making a great fuss, and retreated below decks. May Futrelle, the wife of novelist Jacques Futrelle, was likewise initially reluctant to board; but after her husband told her, "For God's sake, go! It's your last chance! Go!", an officer forced her into the boat. The millionaire Benjamin Guggenheim brought Léontine Aubart, his French mistress, and her maid, Emma Sägasser, to Lifeboat 9 before retiring to his stateroom with his secretary, Victor Giglio. Both men removed their life jackets and put on their evening clothes. Guggenheim told a steward,

We've dressed in our best, and are prepared to go down like gentlemen. There is grave doubt that the men will get off. I am willing to remain and play the man's game if there are not enough boats for more than the women and children. I won't die here like a beast. Tell my wife I played the game out straight and to the end. No women shall be left aboard this ship because Ben Guggenheim was a coward.

Kate Buss and her friend, Marion Wright, were standing with their shipboard acquaintances Douglas Norman and Dr. Alfred Pain, watching the boats being lowered, when a call came for "Any more ladies". The two men brought Buss and Wright to Lifeboat 9, who beckoned Norman and Pain to join them. However, the men were barred from entering by crewmen on the deck. Horrified, Buss demanded to know why they had not been allowed aboard. Hames told her, "The officer gave the order to lower away, and if I didn't do so he might shoot me, and simply put someone else in charge, and your friends would still not be allowed to come." Norman and Pain both perished in the disaster. The lifeboat was picked up by Carpathia several hours later, at about 6:15 a.m.

=== Lifeboat 11 (starboard) ===
Lifeboat 11 was lowered under Murdoch's supervision at 1:37 a.m. with Able Seaman Sidney Humphreys in charge. By now, the lifeboats were being filled much closer to capacity. Lifeboat 11 is estimated to have carried 70 people. One occupant, Steward James Witter, was knocked into the boat by a hysterical woman whom he was helping aboard as it was lowered. First-Class passenger Edith Louise Rosenbaum, a Paris-based correspondent for Women's Wear Daily, brought along her toy pig, a music box that played the Maxixe and had been given to her as a good luck token by her mother. She was too frightened to enter the lifeboat, but when a crew member, mistaking her toy for a baby, tossed it in, she leaped in after it. The toy pig is now part of the collection of the National Maritime Museum in London. Second-Class passenger Nellie Becker protested her way into Lifeboat 11, after an officer placed her son and younger daughter in the boat. She was initially prohibited from entering by Murdoch, who felt the boat was already too full, but eventually made her way aboard. In the chaos, however, her elder daughter Ruth was left behind and was instructed by Murdoch to head for Lifeboat 13.

On reaching the water, Lifeboat 11 was nearly swamped by a jet of water being pumped out from the ship to stem the flooding. Tempers flared among the crowded passengers, some of whom had to stand, as the boat was rowed away from the ship. Rosenbaum offered some levity by using her musical pig to entertain the children underfoot. The lifeboat was met by Carpathia at about 7:00 a.m.

Among the survivors in Lifeboat 11 were:

- Alice Catherine Cleaver, nursemaid to the Allison family's infant son Trevor, whom she brought with her into the boat
- Edith Louise Rosenbaum, American fashion designer
- Stewardess Annie Robinson who was one of only two female crewmembers subpoenaed to testify at the Board of Trade Inquiry into the sinking (the other being Elizabeth Leather)
- Jane Quick and her two daughters, May and Winnifred

=== Lifeboat 13 (starboard) ===
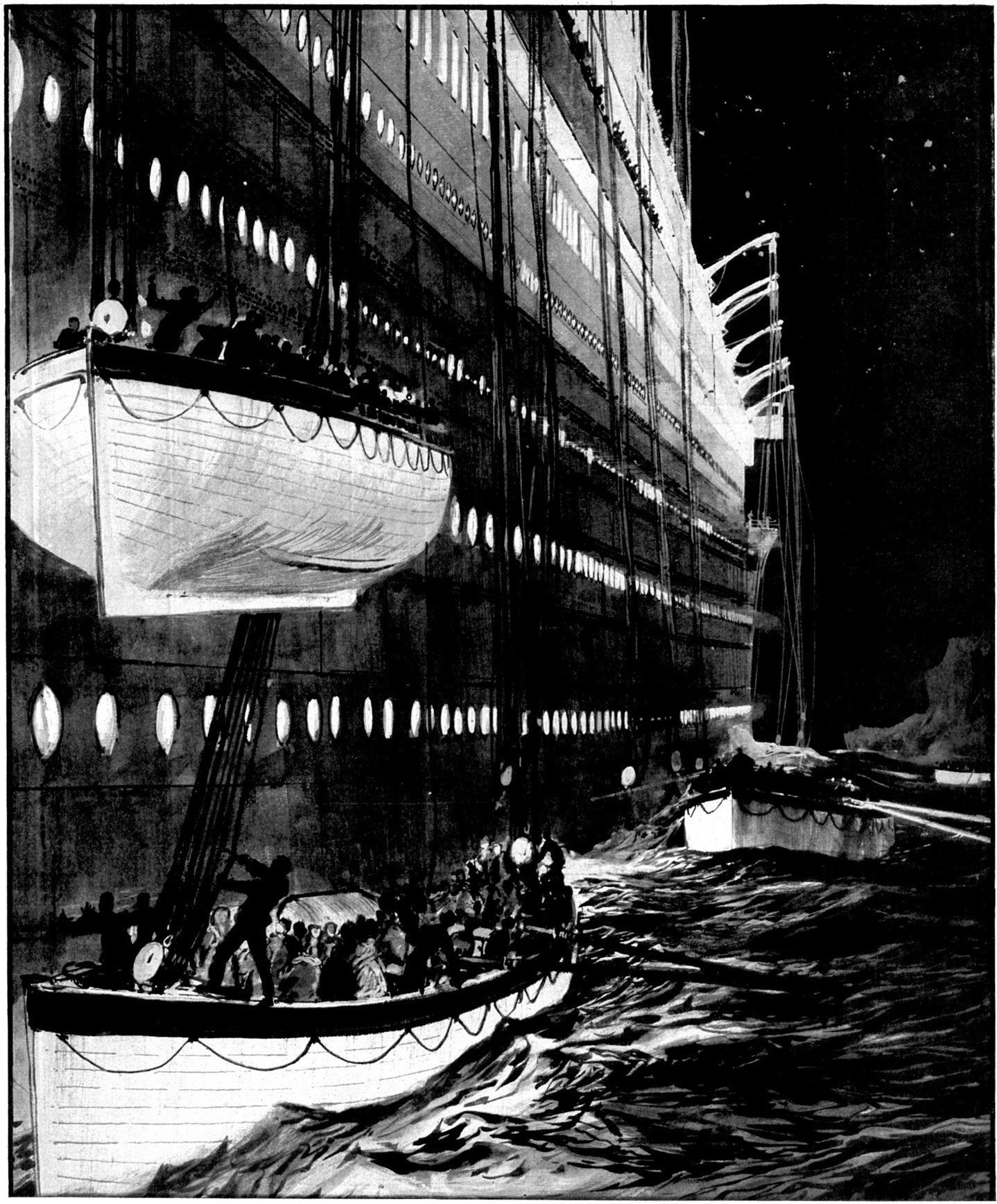
After being lowered into the sea, Boat 13 drifted under the descending Boat 15 (as depicted by Charles Dixon)

Lifeboat 13 was partially filled from the Boat Deck and partially from A Deck after it had been lowered to that level when it was launched under the supervision of Murdoch and Moody at 1:43 a.m. Again, it was heavily occupied, with 55 estimated people aboard and Leading Fireman Frederick Barrett in charge. The occupants were mainly Second- and Third-Class women and children. Among the men aboard was Lawrence Beesley, who subsequently wrote a popular book about the disaster. Dr. Washington Dodge was also aboard, having earlier seen his wife and young son aboard Lifeboat 5. He owed his presence aboard the boat to the apparent guilty feelings of Steward F. Dent Ray, who had urged the Dodges to sail on Titanic in the first place. Just before Lifeboat 13 was lowered, Ray bundled Dodge aboard. 12-year-old Second-Class passenger Ruth Becker was placed in this boat by Moody after being prevented from entering the heavily overloaded Lifeboat 11, which her mother and two siblings had boarded. She was one of the few passengers who brought blankets from her stateroom into a lifeboat, which were later used to keep the stokers, who were wearing sleeveless shirts, warm while rowing. Others did not want to board at all. A woman on deck panicked, crying, "Don't put me in that boat! I don't want to go in that boat! I've never been in an open boat in my life!" Ray told her, "You have got to go and you may as well keep quiet."

While it was being lowered, Lifeboat 13 was nearly swamped by "an enormous stream of water, three or four feet in diameter" coming from the condenser exhaust which was being produced by the pumps, far below, trying to purge the water that was flooding into Titanic. The occupants had to push the boat clear using their oars and spars and reached the water safely. The wash from the exhaust caused the boat to drift directly under Lifeboat 15, which was being lowered almost simultaneously. Its lowering was halted just in time, with only a few feet to spare. The falls aboard Lifeboat 13 jammed and had to be cut free to allow the boat to get away safely from the side of Titanic. According to passenger Delia McDermott, she climbed out of the boat early on to recover her new hat. A few hours later the occupants saw Carpathia coming to their rescue and began rowing towards it to an accompaniment of the Philip P. Bliss hymn, "Pull for the Shore". They were picked up at about 6:30 a.m.

- Leading Fireman Frederick William Barrett (in charge)
- Fireman George William Beauchamp
- Lawrence Beesley, English science master, who later wrote one of the first cogent accounts of the disaster
- Lookout Reginald Robinson Lee
- Dining Room Steward Frederick Dent Ray
- Ellen Shine, Irish immigrant

=== Lifeboat 15 (starboard) ===
Murdoch and Moody oversaw the lowering of Lifeboat 15, concurrently with Lifeboat 13 and it reached the water only a minute later, at 1:45 a.m. Fireman Frank Dymond was put in charge of what was the most heavily loaded boat at launching. The deck was practically empty when the lifeboat was lowered. It was so heavily loaded, with about 70 people, that the gunwales were reported to be far down in the water; one female passenger later said that when she leaned against the gunwale her hair trailed in the water. The boat was one of the last to be recovered by Carpathia, at about 7:30 a.m.

Occupants of Lifeboat 15 included:

- Lillian Gertrud Asplund, her mother Selma, and her younger brother Felix. Her father and three older brothers were left behind and lost.
- Fireman Arthur Priest, who later survived the sinking of the Britannic in 1916.
- Alfred Frank Evans, lookout
- George Cavell, trimmer

=== Emergency Boat 2 (port) ===
The lowering of Emergency Boat 2, the second of the two cutters, was overseen by Smith and Wilde at about 1:45 a.m. When Wilde moved from Lifeboat 12 to Lifeboat 2 to get it ready for loading, he found that it was already filled with a large group of firemen. He ordered them out at gunpoint, telling them, "Get out of there, you damned cowards! I'd like to see every one of you overboard!" They fled. Lifeboat 2 was loaded by Wilde and Captain Smith. It appeared to have been lowered with only approximately 18 people aboard, out of a capacity of 40, in part due to lack of passengers around the bridge where the boat was located.

The occupants were principally women, plus one male Third-Class passenger, Anton Kink, who joined his wife and young daughter in the boat. Joseph Boxhall, the fourth officer who had been in charge of firing distress rockets and signalling a nearby ship, was given charge of the boat by Smith. The boat was ordered to pull alongside the starboard gangway doors, and attempted to obey that order. However, this attempt was abandoned to fear of the ship's suction as the boat rounded the stern. When Titanic sank at 2:20 a.m., No. 2 boat was approximately half a mile away according to Boxhall. At the British inquiry, he stated he saw the ship's lights go out but could not see the sinking itself due to being further away than other boats.

Boxhall spotted the RMS Carpathia on the horizon around 4:00 am and guided her towards Titanic's lifeboats with a green flare. The lifeboat was the first to reach Carpathia, at 4:10 a.m. As the boat did so, Mrs. Mahala Douglas called out "Titanic has gone down with everyone aboard!" Boxhall quickly replied with "Shut up!" Boxhall later apologised for his outburst, but both Boxhall and Douglas agreed that it was acceptable, given the circumstances they had just endured and their current conditions.

The occupants of Lifeboat 2 numbered around 18 people, including:

- Joseph Groves Boxhall (in charge)
- Mahala Douglas, first class passenger
- Louise Kink and her parents, Anton and Louise
- Charlotte Appleton and her sister Mallvina Cornell
- Minnie Coutts and her two young sons, William and Neville

=== Lifeboat 4 (port) ===
Launched concurrently with Lifeboat 10, with about 34 people aboard, Lifeboat 4 was the last of the wooden lifeboats launched under the supervision of Lightoller at 1:50 a.m. with Quartermaster Walter Perkis put in charge. It was actually one of the first lifeboats to be lowered on Captain Smith's suggestion that passengers should be loaded from the Promenade Deck rather than the Boat Deck. However, the captain had forgotten that– unlike on his previous command, Titanic's sister ship Olympic – the forward half of the Promenade Deck was enclosed. Lightoller ordered that the windows on the Promenade Deck's enclosure were to be opened and moved on to deal with the other lifeboats. The windows proved unexpectedly difficult to open and to add to the problems, the lifeboat got caught up on Titanic's sounding spar, which projected from the hull immediately below the boat. The spar had to be chopped off to allow the lifeboat to progress. A stack of deck chairs was used as a makeshift staircase to allow passengers to climb up and through the windows and into the boat.

Among the occupants was Madeleine Astor, the pregnant wife of the American millionaire John Jacob Astor. She had endured a long wait, shuttling back and forth between the Promenade and Boat Decks as plans for loading the boat were made and discarded. Now she boarded, accompanied by her maid and nurse, and helped by Astor, who asked Lightoller if he could join her. Lightoller refused, telling him, "No men are allowed in these boats until the women are loaded first." Astor told Madeleine, "The sea is calm. You'll be all right. You're in good hands. I'll meet you in the morning." He did not survive.

The Carters also reached Lifeboat 4. William Carter helped his wife, Lucile, and daughter, also named Lucile, into the boat, but his son, Billy, had to leave his tan-and-black Airedale dog before he was allowed in the boat.

Of the seven members of the Ryerson party from First-Class, only the five women were initially allowed to board, including Emily, her two daughters, Emily and Susan, the maid, and the governess. The son, John, was not allowed by a steward until his father Arthur stepped forward, proclaiming, "Of course, that boy goes with his mother. He is only 13." All survived except Arthur, who stayed behind.

As it had been ordered, Perkis steered the boat along the side of the ship in search for open gangways, since he had been told to take more passengers on board but found no one. This way, the lifeboat ended up near the davits of Lifeboat 16 (which had been already launched), and two greasers, Thomas Ranger and Frederick William Scott, who were standing near them, climbed down the falls to Lifeboat 4 (Scott fell into the water but was hauled aboard the lifeboat while Ranger got into the boat directly). The boat then rowed away from the ship in order to avoid suction. A third man, lamp trimmer Samuel Ernest Hemming, climbed down the falls of another lifeboat and swam over to Lifeboat 4.

Immediately after the sinking, the lifeboat was approximately 200 yards away and was "mercifully spared the decision of whether or not to return." The boat picked six or seven more men, mostly crewmembers who had stuck together, who jumped from the ship and managed to swim up to the boat: trimmer Thomas Dillon, seaman William Lyons, stewards Andrew Cunningham and Sidney Siebert, greaser Alfred White, and storekeeper Frank Prentice. Siebert and Lyons later died of exposure.

Boat 4 then rowed away from the wrecksite and was called over by Fifth Officer Harold Lowe who had formed a flotilla of lifeboats. Lowe transferred some of his passengers over to the flotilla of boats, including some to lifeboat 4, in preparation of returning to the wrecksite for more survivors and left the flotilla with an empty boat and a crew of seven. No. 4 tied itself with No. 12 and subsequently took in a few occupants from Boat B, with No. 12 taking majority of them. Second Officer Charles Lightoller then took charge of the two boats. By the time it reached Carpathia at 8:00 a.m. it had about 60 occupants including:

- Madeleine Talmage Astor, pregnant wife of the wealthiest man aboard, and her maid and nurse
- Lucile Polk Carter, and her daughter Lucille and son William, and maid
- Emily Borie Ryerson, and her children Susan, Emily, and Jack, and her maid and son's governess
- Marian Longstreth Thayer, whose son was rescued from Collapsible Boat B, and her maid
- Eleanor Widener, who lost both her husband George and son Harry, and her maid

=== Lifeboat 10 (port) ===
Lifeboat 10 was launched at the same time with Lifeboat 4, under the supervision of Wilde and Murdoch at about 1:50 a.m. with Able Seaman Edward Buley in charge. It appeared to have had 57 people aboard when it was launched. By this time Titanic was listing to port, making it increasingly difficult to launch lifeboats from that side of the ship, as the ship's list had created a gap of about 3 feet (0.9 m) between the deck and the sides of the port-side lifeboats. An attempt to board by a young French woman nearly ended in disaster when she jumped towards the lifeboat, fell short and dropped into the gap. She was caught by the ankle by Dining Room Steward, William Burke, and was pulled back on board the ship by a person on the deck. She made it into the lifeboat safely on her second attempt. Titanic was clearly not far from sinking and this realisation led to an increased urgency to load the lifeboat; children were rushed aboard, one baby literally being thrown in and caught by a female passenger. Neshan Krekorian, an Armenian passenger from Third-Class, is said to have jumped into Lifeboat 10 as it was being lowered. Among the passengers of Lifeboat 10, was the youngest Titanic passenger, nine-week-old Millvina Dean, who was also the last remaining survivor. She accompanied her mother, Mrs. Etta Dean, and older brother, Bertram. Two of those aboard were later transferred to another lifeboat, and it had 55 aboard when it met Carpathia a few hours later. It was the second to last lifeboat to be picked up, at 8:00 a.m. The occupants of Lifeboat 10 numbered around 57 people, including:

- Able Seaman Frank Oliver Evans, who later transferred to Lifeboat 14
- Elizabeth Gladys 'Millvina' Dean, the youngest (and last surviving) passenger on board, and her mother Georgette and brother Bertram
- Masabumi Hosono, a Japanese civil servant who jumped into the lowering boat and spent the night rowing
- Barbara West, and her pregnant mother Ada and sister Constance

=== Collapsible Engelhardt Lifeboat C (starboard) ===
Wilde and Murdoch oversaw the launch of the first of the collapsible Engelhardt lifeboats, which was retrieved from its stored position, the sides erected, and the lifeboat attached to the davits. The majority of the forward boats had gone by this time and most of the crowd on deck had moved aft as Titanic's bow dipped deeper into the water. The lifeboat was rushed by a group of stewards and Third-Class passengers who tried to climb aboard but were driven back by Purser McElroy, who fired two warning shots into the air, while Murdoch tried to hold the crowd back. Two First-Class passengers, Hugh Woolner and Swedish industrialist Mauritz Björnström-Steffansson, came to the officers' assistance and dragged out two stewards who had made it into the lifeboat. With the assistance of Woolner and Steffansson, Murdoch and Wilde managed to load the lifeboat quickly but calmly. White Star Line Chairman J. Bruce Ismay also assisted by rounding up women and children to bring them to Collapsible Boat C. Captain Smith, who was observing events from the starboard bridge wing, ordered Quartermaster George Rowe to take command of the boat. After Wilde called repeatedly for women and children to enter, a number of men took up the remaining spaces in the lifeboat, including Ismay; his decision to save himself ultimately proved to be very controversial.

The lifeboat was lowered into the water at 2:00 a.m. and was the last starboard-side boat to be successfully launched. By now Titanic was listing heavily to port, and the boat collided with the ship's hull as it descended towards the water. Those aboard used their hands and oars to keep the boat clear of the side of the ship. As Titanic went down 20 minutes later, Ismay turned his back on the sinking ship, unable to bear the sight. It was the first of the collapsible lifeboats to reach Carpathia, at 5:45 a.m., and had about 43 people on board, including:

- Frank John William Goldsmith, and his mother Emily. His father didn't survive the sinking.
- Joseph Bruce Ismay, managing director of the White Star Line
- William E. Carter, whose family had already been rescued in Lifeboat 4

=== Collapsible Engelhardt Lifeboat D (port) ===
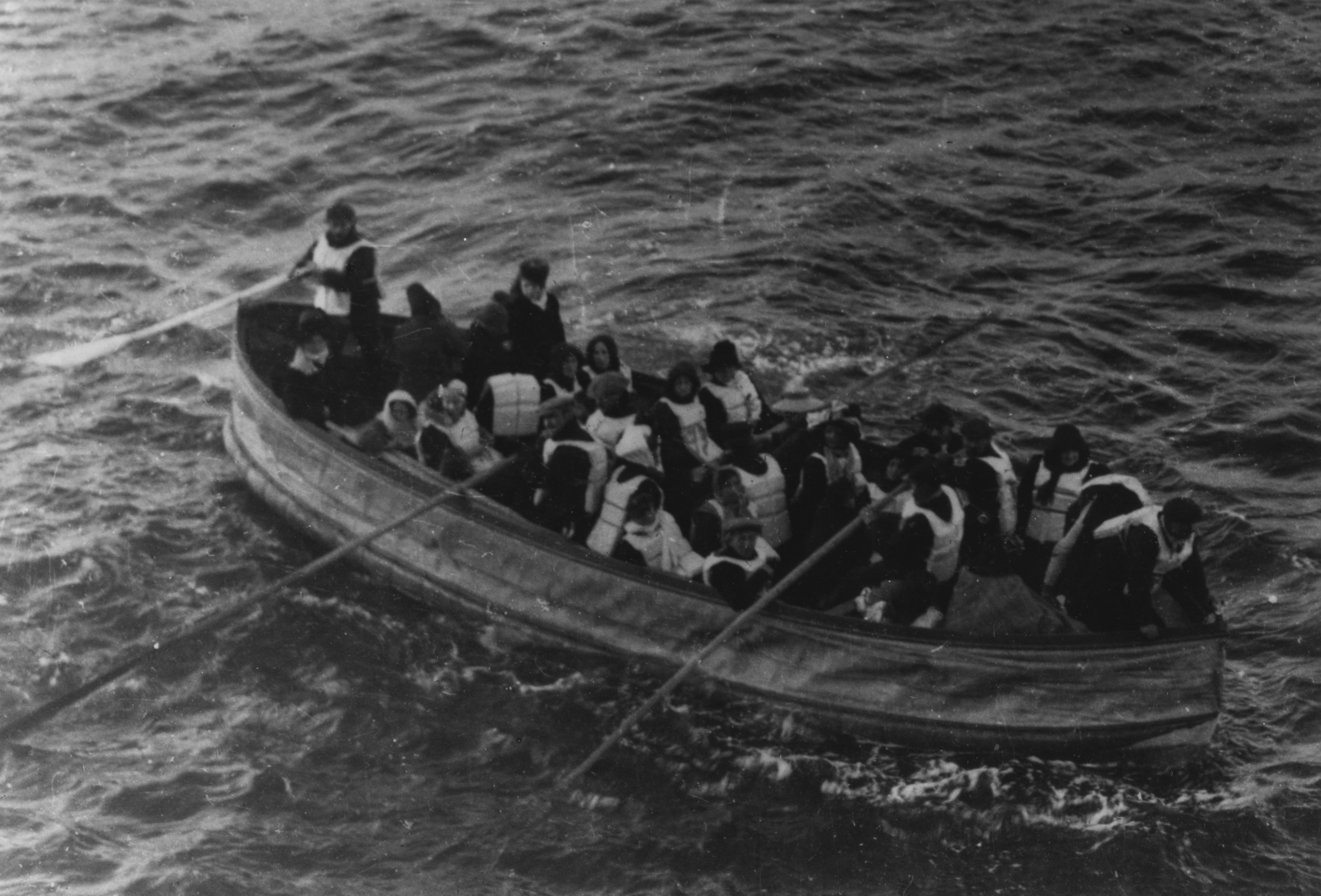
The Titanic's Collapsible Lifeboat D approaches RMS Carpathia at 7:15 a.m. on 15 April 1912.

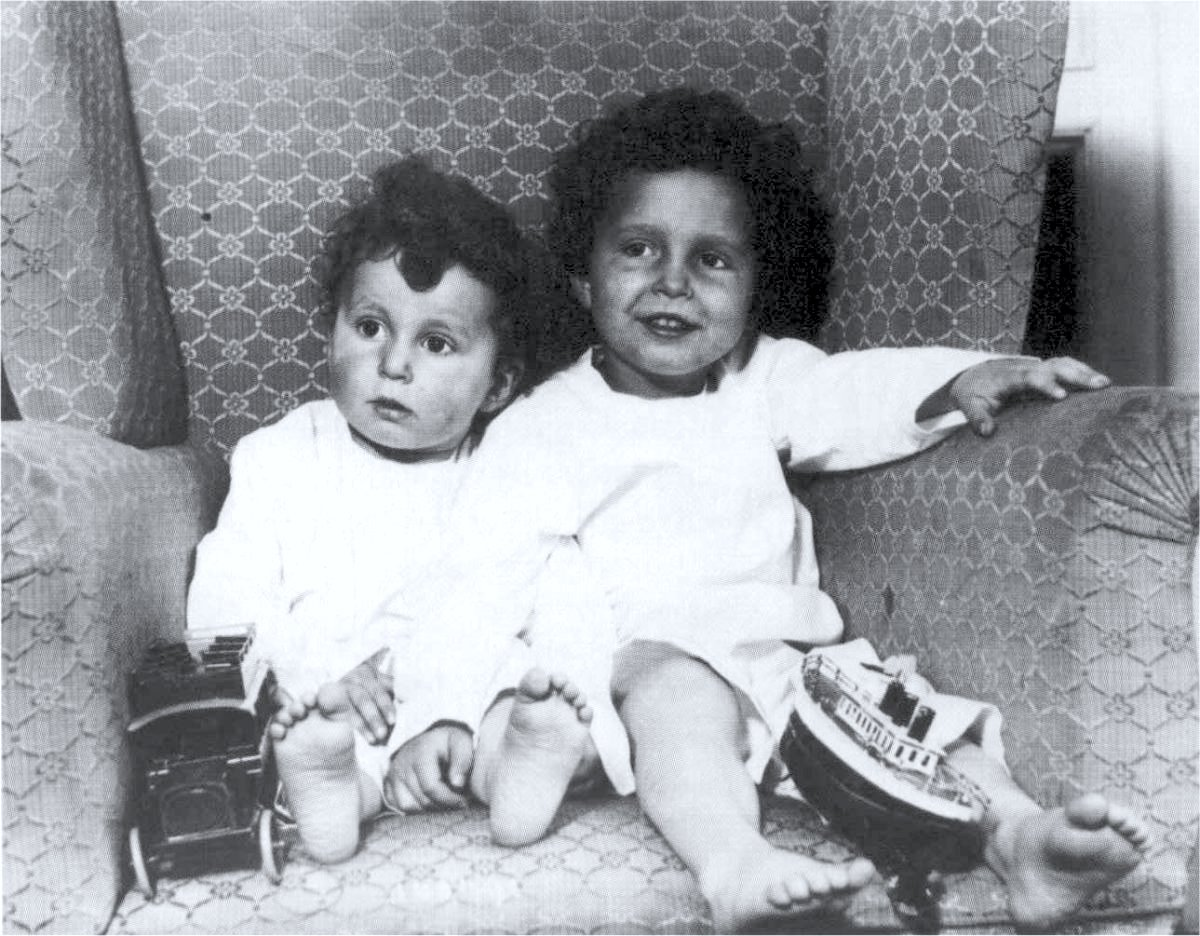
Michel Marcel Navratil, right, and his brother Edmond, left, the "Titanic Orphans" from Collapsible Boat D

By the time Collapsible Boat D was launched at 2:05 A.M., there were still 1,500 people on board Titanic and only 47 seats in the lifeboat. Crew members formed a circle around the boat to ensure that only women and children could board. It was launched under the supervision of Wilde and Lightoller. Collapsible Boat D was the last boat to be launched from Titanic; the rest were washed off the deck. Four-year-old Michael Joseph Yusuf, who was earlier separated from his mother and sister, was placed in the lifeboat by crew members. Two small boys were brought through the cordon by a passenger calling himself "Louis Hoffman". His real name was Michel Navratil; he was a Slovak tailor who had kidnapped his sons from his estranged wife and was taking them to the United States. He did not board the lifeboat and died when the ship sank. The identity of the children, who became known as the "Titanic Orphans", was a mystery for some time after the sinking and was only resolved when Navratil's wife recognised them from photographs that had been circulated around the world. The three boys were the last children to be rescued in a lifeboat. The elder of the brothers, Michel Marcel Navratil, was the last living male survivor of the disaster.

First-Class passenger Archibald Gracie began escorting female passengers to the front of the ship. After spotting passengers Caroline Brown and Edith Evans together, he took them to the lifeboat – one on each arm. First-Class passenger Edith Evans gave up her place in the lifeboat to Caroline Brown, who became the last passenger to enter a lifeboat from the davits. Evans tried to get in but fumbled as she could not reach over the gunwale, deciding to stay on the boat to wait and board another collapsible lifeboat. Evans became one of only four First-Class women to perish in the disaster.

In the end, about 20 people were on board when it left the deck under the command of Quartermaster Arthur Bright. Two First-Class passengers, Hugh Woolner and Mauritz Håkan Björnström-Steffansson, jumped from A-Deck (which had started to flood) into the boat as it was being lowered, with Björnström-Stefansson landing upside down in the boat's bow and Woolner landing half-out, before being pulled aboard by the occupants. Another First-Class passenger, Frederick Maxfield Hoyt, who had previously put his wife in the lifeboat, jumped in the water immediately after, and was hauled aboard by Woolner and Björnström-Steffansson. Collapsible D was later taken into tow by Lifeboat No. 14, under command of Fifth Officer Lowe, after his boat had finished their rescue attempt from the wrecksite. Carpathia picked up those aboard Collapsible Boat D at 7:15 A.M.

- Mauritz Björnström-Steffansson, Swedish businessman
- Irene Wallach Harris, whose husband, theatre producer Henry, did not survive.
- Eleanor Ileen Johnson
- Michel Marcel Navratil and his younger brother Edmond. Their father did not survive.
- Hugh Woolner, British stockbroker

=== Collapsible Engelhardt Lifeboat B (port) ===
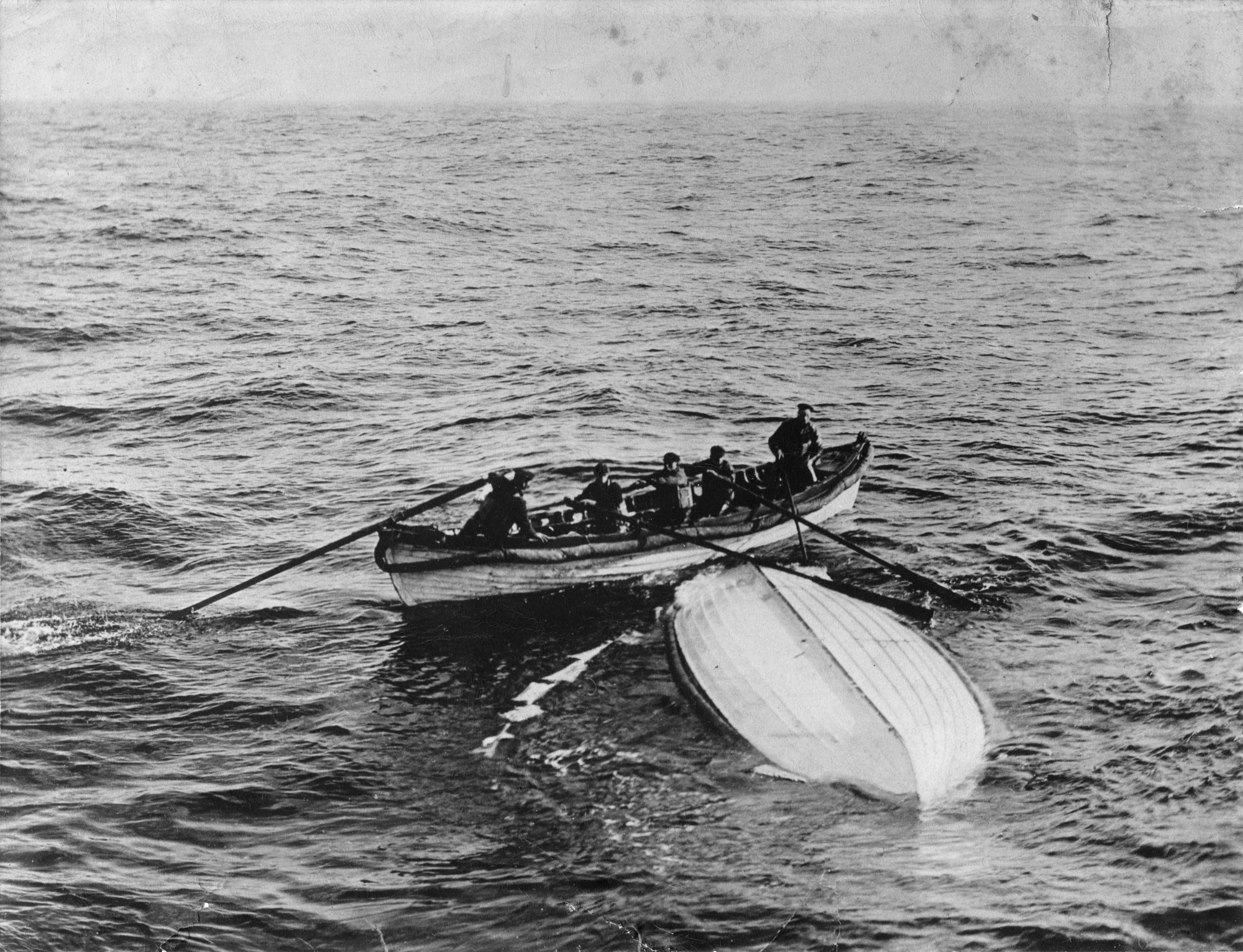
Collapsible Boat B, found adrift by the ship Mackay-Bennett during its mission to recover the bodies of those who died in the disaster

By 2:10 A.M., Lightoller was struggling to retrieve Collapsible Boat B from the roof of the officers' quarters. He rigged up makeshift ramps from oars and spars down which he slid the boat onto the Boat Deck. Unfortunately, for all concerned, the boat broke through the ramp and landed upside-down on the deck. There was no time to right it as Titanic began her final plunge. At 2:15 A.M., water swept across the Boat Deck, washing the upside-down lifeboat and many people into the sea. Wireless operator Harold Bride found himself trapped underneath the overturned hull. Titanic's increasing angle in the water and an opening expansion joint caused the stays supporting the forward funnel to snap and crash into the water, crushing swimmers in its path and pushing Collapsible Boat B further away from the sinking ship. As Titanic went under, the lifeboat was left in the midst of hundreds of people swimming in the water. Several dozen people climbed onto its hull, including Lightoller, who then took charge of it. Also aboard were Jack Thayer (whose mother was saved with her maid in Lifeboat 4, but whose father died), military historian Colonel Archibald Gracie, who later wrote a popular account of the disaster, and Chief Baker Charles Joughin. Bride managed to escape from the air pocket beneath the boat and made it onto the hull.

Those aboard Collapsible Boat B suffered greatly during the night. The boat gradually sank lower into the water as the air pocket underneath it leaked away. The sea began to get up towards dawn, causing the lifeboat to rock in the swell and lose more of its air. Lightoller organised the men on the hull to stand in two parallel rows on either side of the centerline, facing the bow, and got them to sway in unison to counteract the rocking motion caused by the swell. They were directly exposed to the freezing seawater, first up to their feet, then to their ankles and finally to their knees as the boat subsided in the water. For some, the ordeal proved too much and one by one they collapsed, fell into the water and died. The victims included the Third-Class passenger David Livshin, whose body was taken to the Carpathia on the following morning. About 28 men were left alive by the morning and were transferred into other lifeboats before being rescued by Carpathia.

- Wireless Operator Harold Bride
- Edward Arthur Dorking, an English immigrant
- Archibald Gracie IV, a military historian
- Chief Baker Charles John Joughin
- Second Officer Charles Herbert Lightoller (who took charge when he arrived)
- Jack Thayer, 17-year-old son of John B. Thayer, of the Pennsylvania Railroad, who was lost. Mrs. Thayer and her maid were rescued in Lifeboat 4.

According to Paul Lee, the Mackay Bennett, searching for bodies, saw Collapsible B on April 23, 1912, at 41°55' N, 49°20' W. The life boat was seen again on May 16 by the Paul Paix, that reported a ship's lifeboat, clean, bottom up and with no visible damage, floating at position 41°51' N, 42°29' W.

=== Collapsible Engelhardt Lifeboat A (starboard) ===
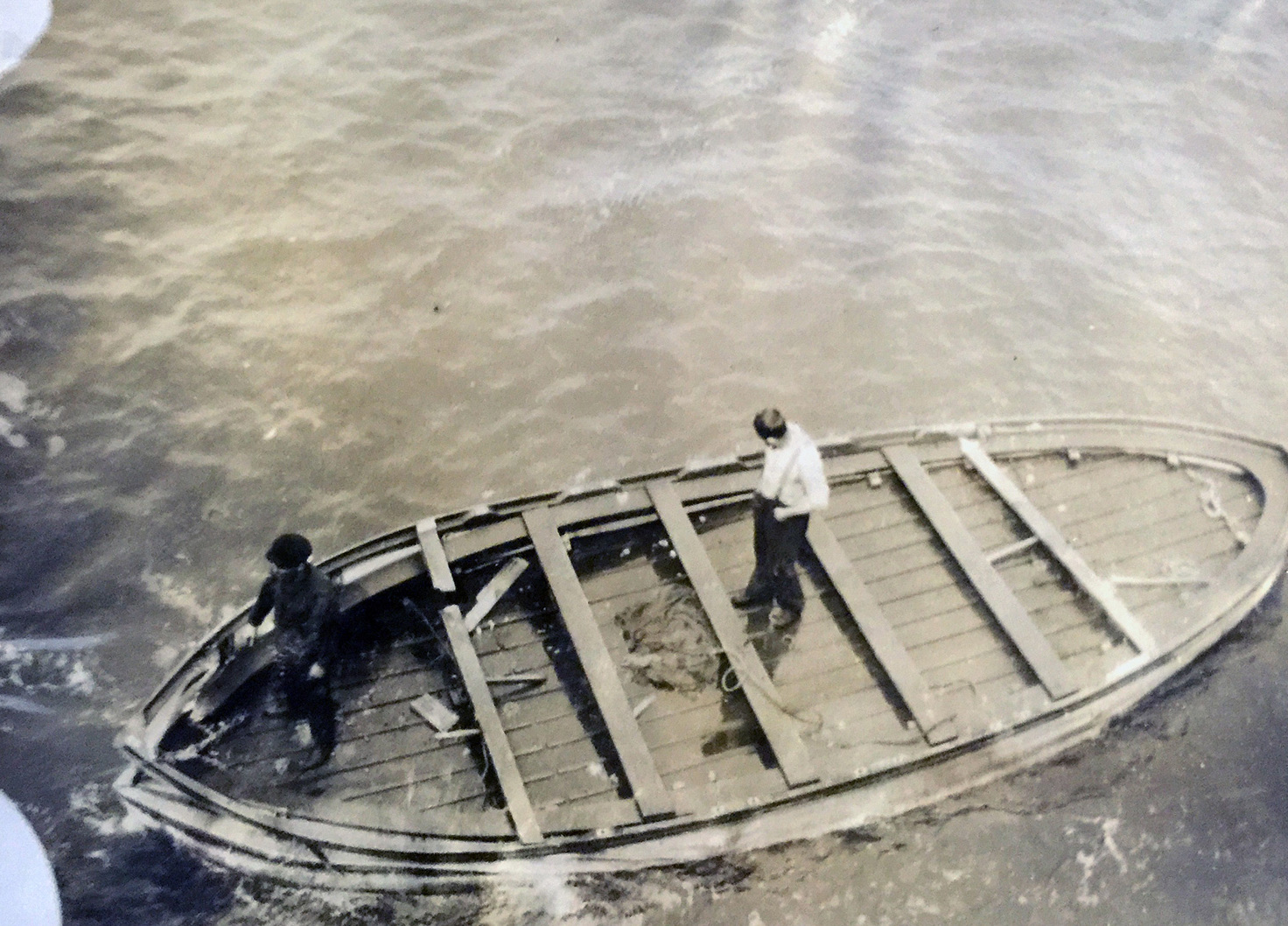
The Titanic Collapsible Boat A, on 13 May 1912.

Collapsible Lifeboat A reached the deck the right way up at 2:05 A.M and was being attached to the falls of No. 1 davits by Murdoch and Moody, and possibly Wilde, when it was washed off Titanic at 2:15 A.M. In the chaos, the canvas sides were not pulled up and the boat drifted away from the ship partially submerged and dangerously overloaded before the falling funnel created a wave washing a lot of the occupants out.

Many of the occupants climbed in from the water but several died of hypothermia or fell back into the sea. Only about 14 people were left alive when they were spotted by Fifth Officer Lowe and the crew in Lifeboat No. 14. Three bodies, including that of Mr. Thomson Beattie, were left in Collapsible Boat A, which was allowed to drift off; they were not recovered until a month later, by RMS Oceanic, another vessel belonging to the White Star Line.

Notable survivors rescued from Boat A were:

- Rhoda Mary Abbott, whose sons did not survive the disaster; she was the only woman who survived after going down with the ship.
- Richard Norris Williams, later a Hall of Fame tennis player who barely missed the collapsing funnel which killed his father Charles Duane Williams

== Recovery and disposal of the lifeboats ==
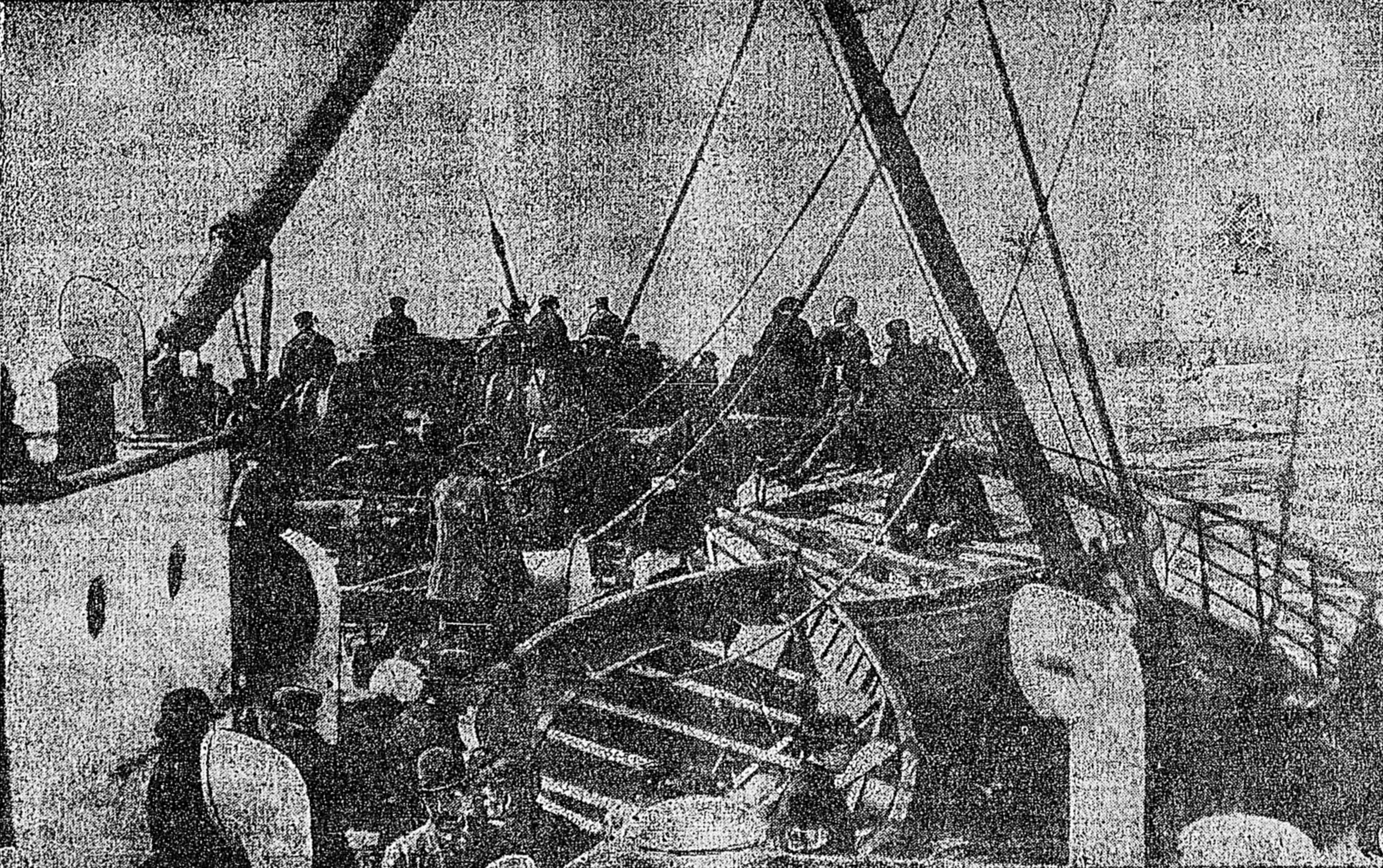
Titanic lifeboats on the deck of the Carpathia on the morning of the Titanic disaster.

Titanic's surviving passengers endured a cold night before being picked up by RMS Carpathia on the morning of 15 April. Lifeboat 2 was the first to be recovered, at 4:10 A.M., with Lifeboat 12 the last, at 8:15 A.M. Lifeboats 1, 2, 3, 5, 6, 7, 8, 9, 10, 11, 12, 13, and 16 were brought aboard Carpathia, with lifeboats 4, 14, 15, and collapsibles C and D set adrift. Collapsible Boat B was found again a few days later by the cable vessel Mackay-Bennett, but an attempt to bring it on board failed, and it was abandoned for good. Collapsible Boat A was later recovered by the White Star liner Oceanic along with three decomposing bodies and taken back to New York to be placed with the other lifeboats recovered by the Carpathia.

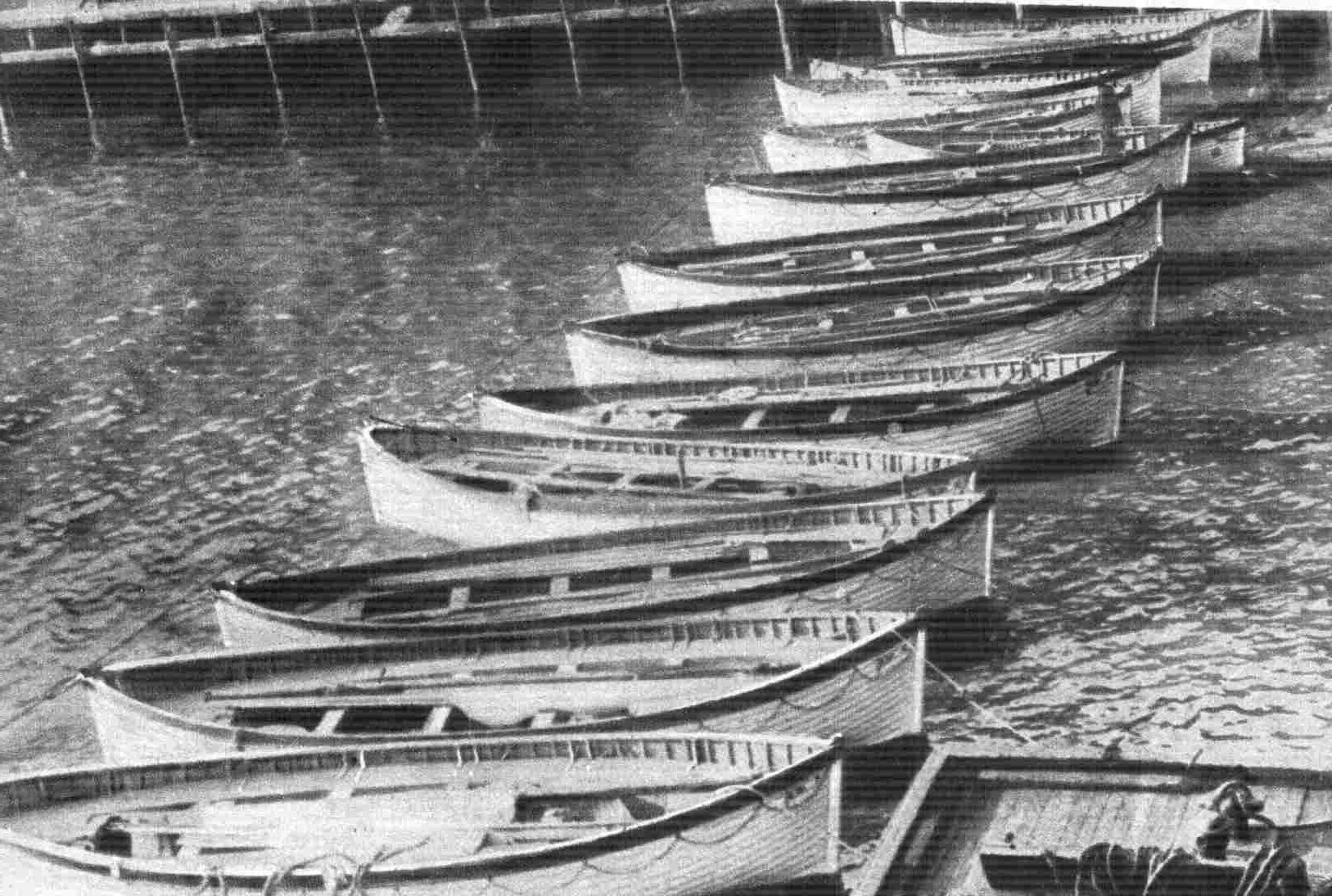
Recovered lifeboats.

The 13 lifeboats retrieved by Carpathia were taken to the White Star Line's Pier 59 in New York, where souvenir hunters soon stripped them of much of their equipment. The S.S. Titanic nameplates which were not already stolen were removed by White Star Line workmen along with the rest of the identification plaques, and the boats were then inventoried by the C.M. Lane Lifeboat Co. of Brooklyn. They were assessed for salvage at a collective value of £930 ($4,972) as the only salvageable items recovered from Titanic. They remained in New York until at least December 1912; their whereabouts have been unknown since. One common misconception is that they may have been taken back to England aboard and installed on Olympic, Titanic's sister ship: however, this has since been disproven. They were either scrapped, left to rot in New York, or quietly redistributed to other vessels sometime after December 1912.

Although nothing remains of the original lifeboats, some surviving fittings can still be seen, such as nameplates reading 'S.S. TITANIC'. Several are known to exist in museums and private collections, along with brass numbers, port plates reading 'LIVERPOOL', and house flags of the White Star Line, such as a burgee removed from the hull of one lifeboat by a souvenir hunter and now displayed in the museum of the Titanic Historical Society. A full-size, accurate replica lifeboat is now on display at the maritime museum in Falmouth, England, and a less accurate one in Belfast at the Titanic Belfast visitor attraction.

== Sources ==
=== Books ===
- Barczewski, Stephanie (2011). Titanic: A Night Remembered. London: Continuum International Publishing Group. ISBN 978-1-4411-6169-7.
- Bartlett, W.B. (2011). Titanic: 9 Hours to Hell, the Survivors' Story. Stroud, Gloucestershire: Amberley Publishing. ISBN 978-1-4456-0482-4.
- Beveridge, Bruce; Hall, Steve (2011). "Description of the ship". In Halpern, Samuel (ed.). Report into the Loss of the SS Titanic: A Centennial Reappraisal. Stroud, UK: The History Press. ISBN 978-0-7524-6210-3.
- Bottomore, Stephen (2000). The Titanic and Silent Cinema. Hastings, UK: The Projection Box. ISBN 978-1-903000-00-7.
- Butler, Daniel Allen (1998). Unsinkable: The Full Story of RMS Titanic. Mechanicsburg, PA: Stackpole Books. ISBN 978-0-8117-1814-1.
- Chirnside, Mark (2004). The Olympic-Class Ships. Stroud, England: Tempus. ISBN 978-0-7524-2868-0.
- Davenport-Hines, Richard (2012). Titanic Lives: Migrants and Millionaires, Conmen and Crew. UK: HarperCollins. ISBN 978-0-00-732164-3.
- Eaton, John P.; Haas, Charles A. (1994). Titanic: Triumph and Tragedy. Wellingborough, UK: Patrick Stephens. ISBN 978-1-85260-493-6.
- Gibson, Allen (2012). The Unsinkable Titanic: The Triumph Behind A Disaster. Stroud, Glos.: The History Press. ISBN 978-0-7524-5625-6.
- Gill, Anton (2010). Titanic: the real story of the construction of the world's most famous ship. London: Channel 4 Books. ISBN 978-1-905026-71-5.
- Gittins, Dave; Akers-Jordan, Cathy; Behe, George (2011). "Too Few Boats, Too Many Hindrances". In Halpern, Samuel (ed.). Report into the Loss of the SS Titanic: A Centennial Reappraisal. Stroud, UK: The History Press. ISBN 978-0-7524-6210-3.
- Hutchings, David F.; de Kerbrech, Richard P. (2011). RMS Titanic 1909–12 (Olympic Class): Owners' Workshop Manual. Sparkford, Yeovil: Haynes. ISBN 978-1-84425-662-4.
- Lord, Walter (2005) [1955]. A Night to Remember. New York: St. Martin's Griffin. ISBN 978-0-8050-7764-3.
- Marshall, Logan (1912). Sinking of the Titanic and Great Sea Disasters. Philadelphia: The John C. Winston Co. OCLC 1328882.
- Ward, Greg (2012). The Rough Guide to the Titanic. London: Rough Guides. ISBN 978-1405386999.
- Wilson, Andrew (2011). Shadow of the Titanic. London: Simon & Schuster. ISBN 978-1-84737-730-2.
- Wormstedt, Bill; Fitch, Tad (2011). "An Account of the Saving of Those on Board". In Halpern, Samuel (ed.). Report into the Loss of the SS Titanic: A Centennial Reappraisal. Stroud, UK: The History Press. ISBN 978-0-7524-6210-3.

=== Online sources ===
- Peter Muhly (15 March 2012). "Tour the Titanic..." Hindustan Times. AFP. Archived from the original on 3 April 2012.
- "National Maritime Museum receives historic Titanic archive: the Lord-Macquitty Collection". National Maritime Museum. 7 April 2003. Archived from the original on 14 April 2012.
- "Lifeboat Flag from Titanic". Titanic Historical Society. Archived from the original on 14 April 2012.
