= Ellen Bird =

Titanic survivor (1881–1949)

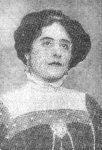
- Bird in an unknown dated photo
- Born: 8 April 1881; Old Buckenham, England, UK
- Died: 11 September 1949 (aged 68); Newport, Rhode Island, U.S.
- Citizenship: United Kingdom; United States (from 1938)
- Occupation: Maid
- Spouse: John Edward Beatie (m. 1914)
- Children: 1 (deceased in childhood)

Ellen Bird (8 April 1881 – 11 September 1949) was an English-born American woman who survived the sinking of the Titanic on 15 April 1912, where she was travelling as a maid of first-class passengers Isidor and Ida Straus, who famously remained on the ship together, with Ida refusing to leave her husband as she was urged to board lifeboat 8.

== Biography ==
=== Early life and Titanic sinking ===
Bird was born in 1881 in Old Buckenham, in Norfolk, England, the daughter of Samuel Bird, a farmer and shepherd, and Mary Ann Clarke. Her parents married in 1864 and had a total of eleven children. Following her siblings' footsteps, she began working at a young age, moving to Surrey in 1901 to work as a servant. By 1912, Bird had settled in London, where she would meet the Strauses.

Isidor and Ida Straus were an elderly couple and businesspeople who had become billionaires in the United States. In January 1912, the couple travelled to Europe in the search of a new maid. They initially hired another young English woman who resigned shortly afterwards. As a result, the Strauses became acquainted with Ellen Bird, hiring her before returning to the US on the Titanic.

At 23:40 (11:40 p.m.) of 14 April 1912, the Titanic struck an iceberg and began sinking. After top crew, including Captain Smith, shipbuilder Thomas Andrews, and carpenter John Hutchinson, the lifeboats were ordered swung out and the evacuation of the ship began. Following strict procedures of women and children first, but interpreting it as "women and children only", second officer Charles Lightoller, in charge of the port side, did not allow men (other than crew in charge of them) into the lifeboats.

The Strauses were on deck by 1:00 a.m. when lifeboat 8 was filling up. When crew members urged Ida to board the boat, she refused if Isidor did not come with her. Crew in charge did not object to Isidor boarding; however, he refused, saying that he would not get into a lifeboat until women and children were rescued first. Ida subsequently approached Bird and told her to board the boat, handing her some jewellery and a fur coat. Bird stated that Ida took back the jewellery but asked her to use the fur coat to keep warm in the icy water.

Lifeboat 8 was lowered at 1:10 a.m. with able seaman Thomas Jones in charge and about 27 people on board, including Noël Leslie, Countess of Rothes, Marie Grice Young, and Bird. They were rescued by the Carpathia around 7:30 a.m.

Isidor and Ida Strauss perished in the sinking, as well as their manservant, 48-year-old John Farthing, whose body was never recovered.

=== Later life and death ===
Upon arriving in New York City on April 18, 1912, Bird was summoned to give testimony about the Strauses' last moments. Swedish survivor Mauritz Håkan Björnström-Steffansson (who had escaped on Titanic Collapsible Boat D) was also asked to testify.

When Bird met Sara Strauss Hess, daughter of the Strauses, she offered to return the fur coat to the Strauss family, which was not accepted by Strauss Hess, telling Bird that she "should keep it" in memory of her mother.

Bird settled in the United States and worked as a servant for rich families. Among her employers were the parents of Douglas Spedden, who had travelled on the Titanic, with the three being rescued on lifeboat 3. Bird worked for the Speddens at their home in Tuxedo Park, New York, until she got married with London-born sailor Julian Edward Beattie on 3 June 1914 in Manhattan. The couple had a daughter named Gwendolyn who died at the age of two in September 1917 in New York City. They did not have any other children after the girl's death.

By 1920, Bird and Beattie were living in Morris, New Jersey, subsequently moving across different locations on the East Coast, living the 1930s in Boston, and moving to New Bedford, Massachusetts, before settling in Newport, Rhode Island, where she worked for prominent local families while Beattie worked in private business.

In 1938, Bird became a naturalized US citizen and led a quiet and private life until her death on 11 September 1949 at a rest home in Newport, Rhode Island. She was 68 years old and was buried in Acushnet Cemetery in Bristol, Rhode Island.

=== Aftermath ===
Among other belongings from the Strauses that Bird took on board lifeboat 8 was a deck plan by Isidor and Ida that was conserved by a private collector after Bird's death in 1949. The old and fragile paper, still in one piece, was auctioned in October 2011 by Henry Aldridge and Son.

In December 2017, Paul Kurzman, a great-grandson of the Strauses who is a professor and specializes in the family's history stated in an interview that his great-grandparents showed great respect for Bird and reassured her to go on lifeboat 8. Kurzman also said that the portrayal of the couple in the 1997 James Cameron movie Titanic was not accurate, as it was reported that the Strauses were standing on the port side deck when a wave washed them both to sea. In the film, the Strauses (portrayed by American actors Lew Palter and Elsa Raven) are seen together in bed holding each other seemingly waiting to die as water rushes rapidly in the room.

Bird's husband John Edward Beattie outlived her for many years; he died on 21 September 1963 and was buried with her.

== In media ==
The Strauses and the situation involving the escape of Ellen Bird are portrayed in different films about the Titanic, including the Cameron blockbuster in 1997, where the events are depicted in one of the film's deleted scenes.
