= William Sloper =

William Sloper may refer to:

- William Sloper (died 1743) (c.1658–1743), deputy paymaster general and MP for several boroughs
- William Sloper (1709–1789), son of the above, MP for Great Bedwyn
- William Charles Sloper (aft. 1728 – aft. 1813), son of the above, MP for St Albans
- William Thomson Sloper (1883–1955), American stockbroker and survivor of the sinking of the RMS Titanic
