= Alfred Olliver =

British Sailor

- Born: 2 June 1884; St Ouen, Jersey, United Kingdom
- Died: 18 June 1934 (aged 50); St. Saviour, Jersey, United Kingdom
- Burial place: St Saviour's Churchyard, Jersey
- Occupations: Quartermaster, Merchant sailor
- Known for: Surviving crewmember of RMS Titanic
- Spouse: Amelia Gertrude Collins (m. 1910)
- Children: 3

Alfred John Olliver (2 June 1884 – 18 June 1934) was a sailor from Jersey who was one of seven quartermasters serving on RMS Titanic and was present on the bridge of the ship when it hit the iceberg that would sink her on the morning of 15 April 1912.

== Early life ==
Olliver was born in the parish of St Ouen on 2 June 1884. He was the son of French farmer Pierre Olliver (1859–1914) and Jerseywoman Eliza Le Cornu (1859–1934), who married around 1879. They had eleven children, three of whom died in infancy. Alfred's known siblings were Peter (b. 1880), Eliza Jane (b. 1882), Henry (b. 1886), Hilda (b. 1888), Mary Ann (b. 1890), Eliza Jane (b. 1896), William (b. 1898), John (b. 1899), and Francis John (b. 1901).

In 1891, he and his family were living at Green Vales in St Brelade, moving to St Nicholas by 1901. Alfred went to sea at age 16, joining the Royal Navy and was stationed at the Royal Marine Barracks in Alverstoke, Hampshire. After seven years in the Royal Navy, he joined the Merchant service.

== RMS Titanic ==
On the night of the sinking, Olliver was at the ship's wheel until 10pm at which time he was relieved by Robert Hichens. He was running messages for the officers and returned to the wheelhouse as the ship hit the iceberg. He was ordered to find the carpenter and check the level of the water but found him already doing so. He then took a message to the Chief Engineer and delivered a message to Captain Edward Smith. He was ordered by the Chief Officer to tell the boatswain to prepare the lifeboats. He entered a lifeboat with Third Officer Herbert Pitman and 5 other crew, along with about 35 passengers, mostly women and children. Olliver ensured the plug was in the lifeboat ensuring it did not get swamped and capsize. He later gave evidence at the United States Senate inquiry into the sinking of the RMS Titanic.

== Death ==
Olliver returned to England and continued to work for White Star Line but did not return to sea. He died on 18 June 1934 in St Saviour and was buried in an unmarked grave in St Saviour's Churchyard. His grave was given a headstone in 2012 in commemoration of the 100th anniversary of the sinking.

== Personal life ==
He married Amelia Gertrude Collins in 1910. They had three children. His widow Amelia died in Grouville, Jersey on 26 January 1975 aged 91.

== Portrayals ==
- Dan Cressy (1958) - A Night to Remember
- Alex Humphrey (1997) - Titanic
