= Herbert Pitman =

British Merchant seaman (1877–1961)

Herbert Pitman MBE
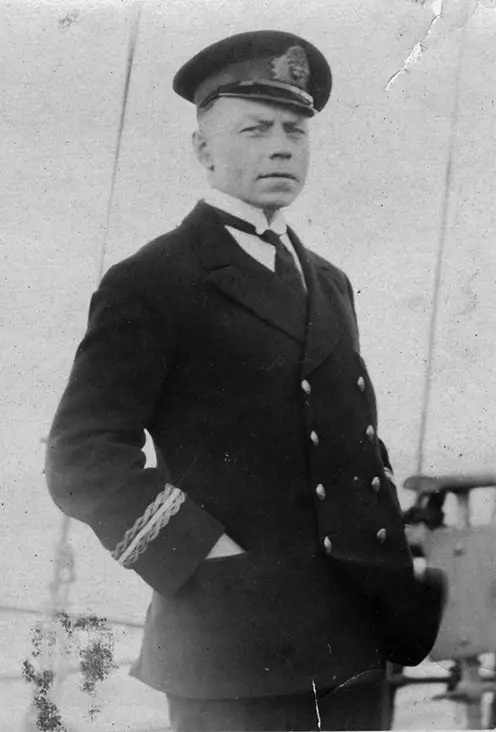
- Undated photograph of Pitman.
- Born: 20 November 1877; Sutton Montis, Somerset, England
- Died: 7 December 1961 (aged 84); Pitcombe, Somerset, England
- Resting place: St. Leonard's Churchyard, Pitcombe, Somerset
- Other name: Bert
- Occupation: Merchant seaman
- Known for: Third Officer of RMS Titanic
- Spouse: Mildred "Mimi" Kalman (m. 1922; died 1933)
- Military career
- Allegiance: United Kingdom
- Branch: Royal Naval Reserve
- Service years: 1914–1919
- Rank: Acting Paymaster Lieutenant
- Conflicts: World War I

Herbert John Pitman MBE (20 November 1877 – 7 December 1961) was a British Merchant Navy seaman, who was the Third Officer of RMS Titanic during its ill-fated maiden voyage, and one of four officers to survive when the ship sank after striking an iceberg during the night of 14 April 1912.

Pitman moved from the deck crew to the purser's desk soon after the Titanic disaster. In that capacity, he went on to serve in the Merchant Naval Service in both World War I and World War II. In total, he spent over 50 years at sea as both a deck officer and as a purser. He died in 1961, the second last surviving officer of Titanic.

== Early life ==
Pitman was born in the village of Sutton Montis, Somerset, the second child of Sarah (née Marchant) and farmer Henry Pitman. He had an older brother William Henry and a younger sister Ida Mary. After his father's death in 1880, when he was three years old, his mother eventually remarried to Albert Charles Candy. In 1881, a census shows Herbert Pitman was living on a 112-acre (45 ha) farm on Sutton Road with his brother, sister, and widowed mother.

== Career ==
Pitman first went to sea in 1895 at the age of 17. He received the shore part of his nautical training in the Navigation Department of the Merchant Venturers' Technical College, under Mr. E. F. White. He served a four-year apprenticeship with James Nourse Ltd. followed by five years as a Deck Officer. From 1904, he served one year as a Deck Officer with the Blue Anchor Line before moving to the Shire Line, with whom he served for six months. He qualified as a Master Mariner in August 1906.

Pitman moved to the White Star Line in 1907. His first ship was the SS Gothic as third officer. He went on to serve as Fourth, Third and Second Officer on the vessels SS Delphic and RMS Majestic, and as Fourth Officer on the RMS Oceanic. On the Oceanic, he served alongside Charles Lightoller and James Moody, who would later become his shipmates aboard Titanic.

=== RMS Titanic ===
Like the other junior officers Pitman received a telegram early in 1912 directing him to report to White Star's Liverpool office at nine in the morning on 26 March of that year. There he collected his ticket for Belfast; he arrived there at noon the following day and reported to then-Chief Officer William Murdoch. As the Titanic departed Southampton on 10 April, Pitman was at his departure station, assisting Murdoch, by then First Officer after a reshuffle of senior officers, at the docking bridge on the stern of the ship, supervising the casting-off of mooring ropes and taking on of tug lines. He witnessed the liner SS New York break off her moorings and nearly collide with the Titanic.

White Star operated a watchkeeping system whereby the three senior officers worked the same four-hour watches in every 12-hour period while the junior officers stood the traditional system of four hours on/four hours off with the rest of the Titanic's deck crew. This was divided into two watches, designated Port and Starboard, and pairs of junior officers were assigned to each watch. Pitman was assigned to the Port Watch, standing duties with Fifth Officer Harold Lowe. While the Titanic was at sea, Pitman's duties included working out celestial observation and compass deviation, general supervision of the decks, looking to the quartermasters, and relieving the bridge officers when necessary.

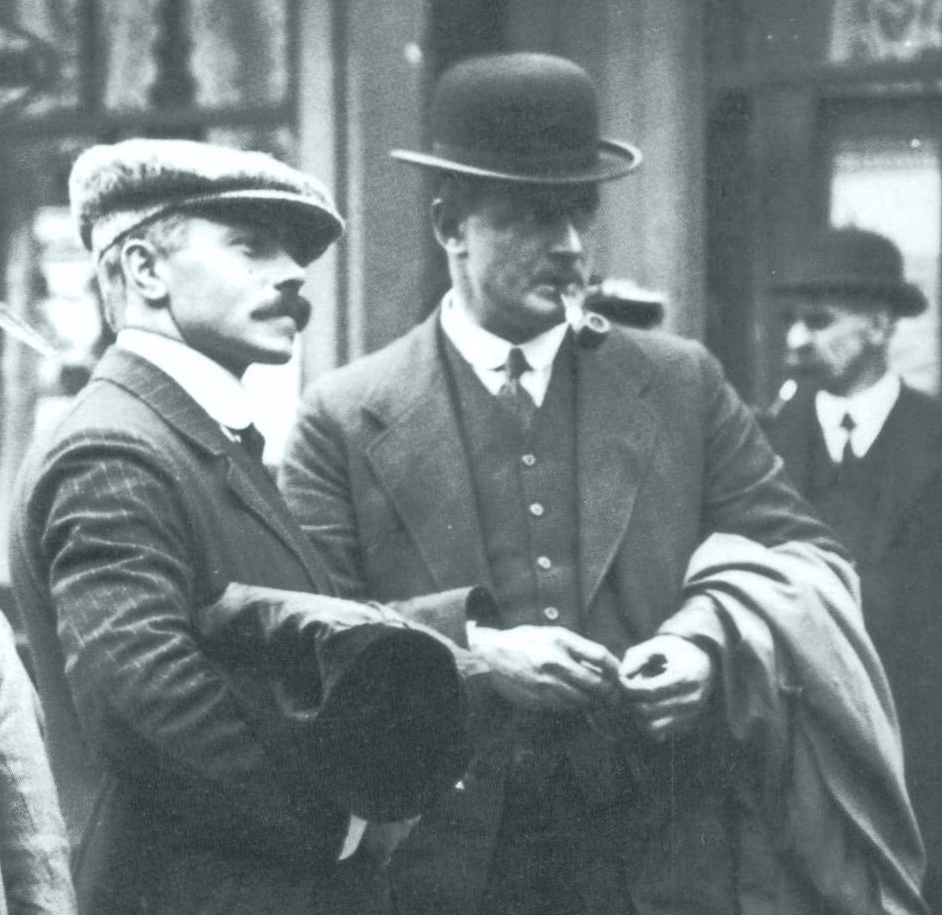
Pitman (left) with Second Officer Charles Lightoller (right) after arriving in Liverpool on the RMS Adriatic

At the time of the Titanic's collision with the iceberg, Pitman was off-duty, half-asleep in his bunk in the Officers' Quarters. He heard and felt the collision, later testifying that it felt like the ship "coming to an anchor." He was dressing for his watch when Fourth Officer Joseph Boxhall rushed in and informed him they had struck an iceberg and were taking on water. Pitman was then ordered to report to the starboard side of the ship to assist in uncovering lifeboats. After receiving the command to lower the boats, Murdoch ordered Pitman to take charge of Lifeboat No. 5. Before Pitman entered the lifeboat, Murdoch shook his hand saying "Goodbye; good luck." Pitman at this point did not believe that the Titanic was seriously endangered, and thought the evacuation of passengers was precautionary. He stepped into the lifeboat and it was lowered to the water. Murdoch had ordered Pitman to take the lightly loaded lifeboat to the gangway doors to take on more passengers there, but the doors failed to open as the lifeboat waited for this about 100 yards off from the ship.

Up to this point Pitman had expected the ship to remain afloat. After an hour in the lifeboat however, he realised that Titanic was doomed, and withdrew the lifeboat 300 yards further off from the descending ship. He watched Titanic sink from about 400 yards distance, and was one of the few to state afterwards in the official enquiries that he thought she sank in one piece. As the stern slipped under water, he looked at his watch and announced to the lifeboat's occupants, "It's 2:20." Hearing the cries of those in the water after the ship had gone, Pitman decided to row back to them to rescue whomever he could. However, after announcing this course of action to the passengers in the lifeboat he was confronted with voluble protests from amongst them against the idea, with the expression of fear that the lifeboat would be mobbed and capsized by the panicking multitude in the water. Faced with this, Pitman acquiesced and kept the lifeboat at its station several hundred yards off whilst the passengers and crew in the water perished swiftly in the cold.

Lifeboat No. 5 was picked up by the next morning by the rescue ship RMS Carpathia along with the other survivors from the sinking, and Pitman arrived at Pier 54 in New York City with the rest of the survivors on 18 April 1912. While in New York, he testified as a witness in the American Senate inquiry into the sinking. During cross-examination, when asked about the cries in the water, Pitman reportedly broke down in tears.

Pitman and his fellow surviving officers left New York City on the RMS Adriatic on 2 May 1912. On returning home to England, he testified as a witness to the sinking for a second time before a British Wreck Commissioner's inquiry.

=== Later years ===
Pitman continued to serve with the White Star Line following the Titanic disaster. He later moved from deck officer to purser after a change in policy saw him fail a colour blindness test. In that capacity he served on the liners RMS Oceanic and Titanic's older sister RMS Olympic.

In June 1913, Pitman appeared as a witness in the case of Ryan v. The Oceanic Steam Navigation Company.

During World War I, Pitman served as an Assistant Paymaster, Acting Paymaster, and then Acting Paymaster Lieutenant in the Royal Naval Reserve aboard RMS Teutonic. In 1919, he was demobilised and returned to the Merchant service.

In the early 1920s, he moved from White Star to the Shaw, Savill & Albion Line. During World War II, he served as purser on board the RMS Mataroa, and finally retired in the spring of 1946 after over fifty years at sea. For his services in the merchant service, he was made a Member of the Order of the British Empire (MBE).

== Personal life ==
Pitman married Mildred "Mimi" Kalman in 1922, in Paddington, London. Kalman, who was Jewish, was from New Zealand and an aspiring actress with an interest in music. She died in 1933.

During his career, Pitman gave Castle Cary, Somerset, as his shore address. In retirement, he lived in the village of Pitcombe, Somerset, with his niece and her husband.

Pitman was a Freemason, being initiated into Abbey Lodge, No. 3341 in Hatfield, Hertfordshire, on 14 June 1909. He remained a member of the lodge until his death. He was passed to the degree of Fellow Craft on 1 March 1910, and was raised to the degree of Master Mason on 12 June 1912, two months after Titanic sank.

Pitman was also an avid stamp collector and brought his collection with him aboard Titanic; it was subsequently lost in the sinking.

In 1958, Pitman attended the premier of A Night to Remember with Joseph Boxhall, his shipmate aboard Titanic. He was reportedly impressed by the film, saying, "The film is an excellent representation of what happened, and I cannot recall a single technical mistake."

Boxhall and Pitman subsequently remained in touch and Pitman visited Boxhall at his home in Christchurch, Hampshire, in 1961, a few months before his death.

=== Death ===
Pitman died of a subarachnoid hemorrhage on 7 December 1961 at the age of 84 years. His body was buried in the graveyard of Pitcombe Parish Church, Somerset.

== Portrayals ==
- In the 1958 A Night to Remember film, Pitman was portrayed by Dennis Carnell.
- In the 1997 Titanic film, Pitman was portrayed by film producer Kevin de la Noy in promotional images but never appeared on screen.
- In the 2012 Titanic miniseries, Pitman briefly appears in the third episode, played by an unknown actor.
- In the 2024 Unsinkable film, Pitman was portrayed by Massimo Lista.
