= Margaret Mannion =

Titanic survivor (1883–1970)

- Born: 5 November 1883
- Died: 15 May 1970 (aged 86)

Margaret Mannion (5 November 1883 – 15 May 1970) was a survivor of the RMS Titanic.

== Rescue from the Titanic ==
Of Loughanboy, Ahascragh, County Galway, Mannion left from Queenstown with her fiancé Martin Gallagher, best friend Ellen Mockler and Martin's friends Thomas Kilgannon and Thomas Smyth.

On the evening of the third day, Margaret and Ellie went up for air. It was very cold, and they saw ice and icebergs. They eventually went below. They were getting dressed for bed "when the ship took a very sharp turn which threw both of them to the floor." At 11.40 p.m., just as she was beginning to sleep, there was a sudden, violent jerk which threw people across their cabins. There was silence. The engine stopped.

Margaret jumped up and rushed out into the corridor to see what was going on. So did many of the other passengers. Suddenly, an ear-splitting siren went off and people began to panic. Just then a very loud crashing sound shook the vessel. The two girls were in a terrible state because neither they nor any of the third class passengers knew what was going on .. [they] became desperate when the water started to rise about their feet. The men stormed down the corridors, followed by the ladies in their light clothes. Having smashed a locked barrier, they were face with armed sailors, but they brushed them aside in their frantic desire to get to the boat deck. When they reached the deck, the second class passengers were already climbing into the lifeboats. The sailors had no choice but to let them follow.

Mannion was lucky to jump into the second-to-last boat very certainly with Ellen Mockler who survived too. She could not see any of her male friends. She caught a final glimpse of Martin Gallagher kneeling with a group of passengers on the deck, saying the Rosary. A first-class passenger saved her life by giving her a fur coat to survive the cold until she was rescued by the RMS Carpathia. Gallagher, Smyth and Kilgannon all died.

She subsequently spent seven years in New York City, returning in 1919. In 1920, she married Martin Hopkins of Chapelfinnerty, Ahascragh. In 1959, the family moved to Ganaveen, Clontuskert. Her descendants still live in the parish.
