= Thomas Jones (sailor) =

British sailor (1877–1967)

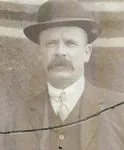
- Jones in May 1912
- Born: 15 November 1877; Cemaes, Anglesey, Wales, United Kingdom
- Died: June 1967 (aged 89); Liverpool, England, United Kingdom
- Occupation: Merchant seaman
- Known for: Crew member of the Titanic

Thomas William Jones (15 November 1877 – June 1967), (Note: See image in section "later life". His death date is marked in a plaque in his honour on 84 Jacob Street in Liverpool.) nicknamed as Tom Titanic was a British sailor who survived the sinking of the Titanic on 15 April 1912. Jones, who was part of the deck crew, served as an able seaman and was put in charge of lifeboat #8 when it was launched at 1:10 AM. Jones, who insisted on going back for survivors, developed a lifelong correspondence with the Countess of Rothes after the sinking, one of the few people on boat No. 8 who supported going back.

== Biography ==
=== Early life ===
Jones was born in Cemaes, Anglesey, Wales. He joined the Royal Navy in his youth and was living in Liverpool when he signed for the maiden voyage of the Titanic. Before joining the crew of the Titanic, Jones had worked as a lookout on board the Majestic and the Oceanic. Jones served for six years on the Majestic, working on her without missing any trip during that period of time. During his testimony at the US Senate Inquiry, Jones said that he had worked for uninterrupted seven years in the route between Europe and North America.

=== On the Titanic ===
Jones, who served as an able seaman on the Titanic, was immediately called to deck to help with the preparation of the lifeboats after the ship collided with an iceberg at 11:40 p.m. on 14 April 1912. He helped to unleash Collapsible D and, at around 1:00 a.m., Jones joined Captain Edward J. Smith and Chief Officer Wilde in filling lifeboat #8 (port side) with women and children. Jones said that he went for lamps and saw some other crew bringing three of them. He decided to jump aboard lifeboat #8, whereupon Captain Smith asked him if the plug was in the boat and called twice for more women to board the boat. Jones said that a woman and her little daughter reluctantly got in, leaving her husband behind. Jones also recalled that an old lady refused to enter the boat and stayed on the Titanic with her husband. It is assumed that they may have been Ida and Isidor Straus. (Note: Bedroom Steward Alfred Crawford, one of the three crew members on board lifeboat #8, identified Ida and Isidor Strauss during his testimony before the US Senate Committee.)

As no more women were near lifeboat #8, Captain Smith ordered to lower it away. Jones said that Captain Smith had instructed him to row toward a light in the horizon and come back to the Titanic if he successfully discharged the passengers on that vessel. He testified that they stopped rowing toward the light when they saw it was too far. During the night, Jones asked the boat's occupants to allow him to return for survivors, but he faced strong opposition and was "overruled" by the passengers. Among the few who supported his intention was the Countess of Rothes, whom Jones put in command of the tiller, later praising her for "being more of a man than any we had on board". The Countess had experience in sailing from her husband's owning of a yacht. Jones had made it clear that he wanted to return, saying:

Ladies, if any of us are saved, remember I wanted to go back. I would rather drown with them than leave them.

Jones and the Countess of Rothes remained in charge of the boat until being rescued by the Carpathia. The other two men aboard were Bedroom Steward Alfred Crawford and able seaman Charles Pascoe.

=== Later life ===
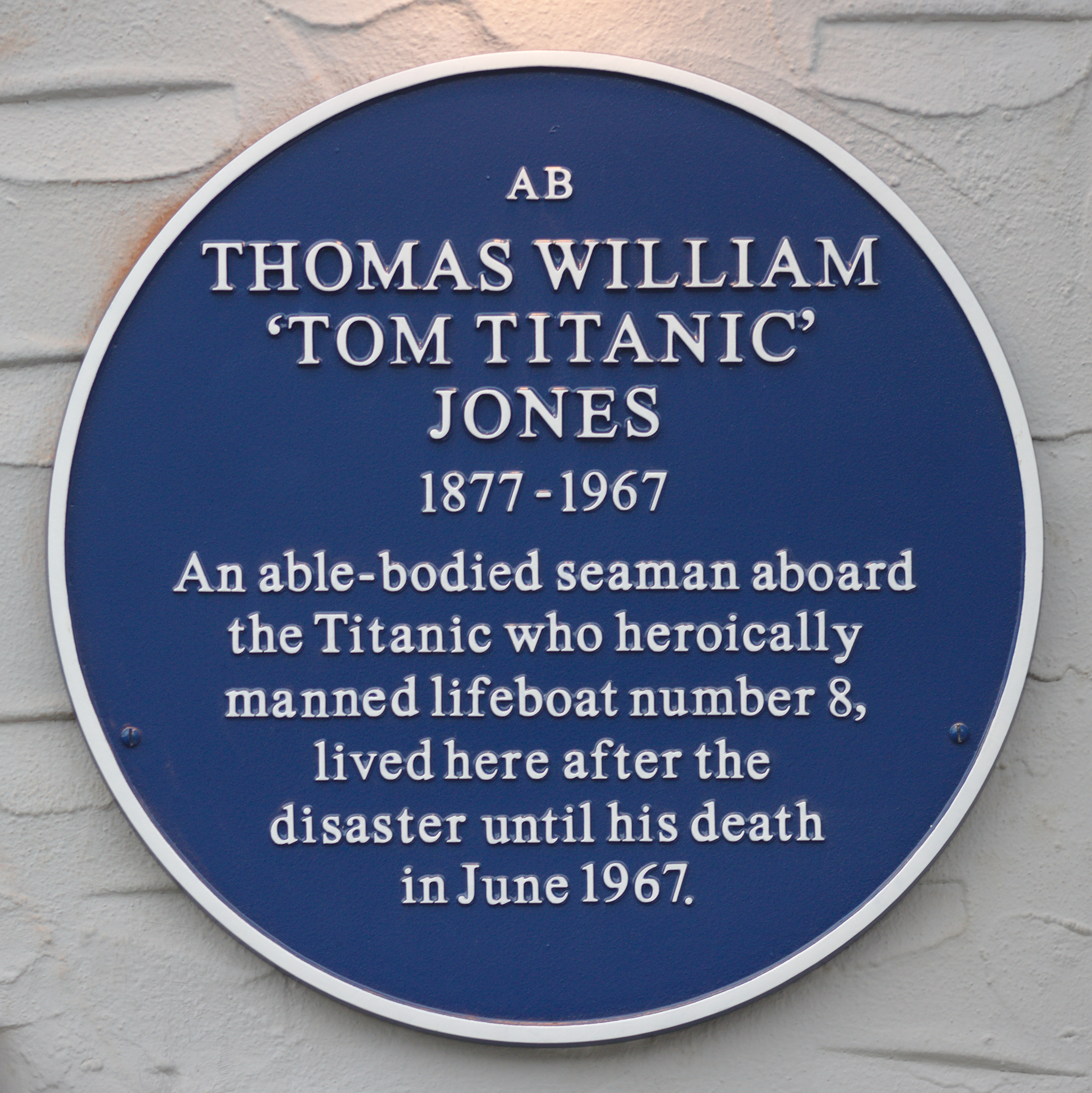
A plaque in memory of Jones was placed in September 2021 at 84 Jacob Street in Liverpool.

After the sinking, Jones permanently settled in Liverpool. He married and had two daughters. In 1954, Jones was interviewed by author Walter Lord, who was writing his well-known book A Night to Remember. During the interview, Jones said that he had maintained a lifelong correspondence with the Countess of Rothes, with Lord telling Jones that he had interviewed the Countess and that she admired him, praising Jones' actions on the night of the sinking. Jones kept a silver pocket watch which the Countess had gifted him as gratitude for his actions that night, while Jones gave Rothes a plaque with the number 8 from the lifeboat.

Another passenger of the boat, Gladys Cherry, cousin of the Countess of Rothes, also praised Jones, writing a personal letter to him and thanking him for his actions on boat #8.

Jones died in June 1967 in Liverpool, at the age of 89. In 2012, Angela Young, great-granddaughter of the Countess of Rothes, visited Nell Jones, one of Jones' two daughters, who was still living in Liverpool. Young showed her the letters and other items that Jones had sent to the Countess, and promised to keep the collection together to preserve the story between the seaman and the countess.

In September 2021, the Liverpool City Council approved a memorial for Jones at the Maritime Museum. It was unveiled during a ceremony attended by his family and group of history researchers.

== Bibliography ==
- Butler, Daniel Allen (1998). Unsinkable. Stackpole Books. ISBN 978-0-8117-1814-1.
- Medhurst, Simon (2022). Titanic: Day by Day 366 Days with the Titanic. Pen & Sword Books. ISBN 9781399011440.
