= William Thomson Sloper =

American stockbroker and Titanic survivor (1883–1955)

- Sloper in the 1940s
- Born: December 13, 1883; New Britain, Connecticut, U.S.
- Died: May 1, 1955 (aged 71); Kensington, Connecticut, U.S.
- Occupation: Stockbroker
- Known for: Titanic survivor
- Spouse: Helen Tallmadge Lindenberg

William Thomson Sloper (December 13, 1883 − May 1, 1955) was an American stockbroker and survivor of the sinking of the RMS Titanic. Sloper, who was 28 when the Titanic sank, traveled as a first-class passenger and was saved after boarding lifeboat #7, the first to be launched from the vessel.

== Titanic ==
Sloper was born in New Britain, Connecticut, son of Andrew Jackson Sloper and Ella Thomson Sloper.

In April 1912, he was returning to the United States after a three-month vacation in Europe. The stockbroker and estate manager had planned to travel on board the RMS Mauretania. However, while still in Europe, he met the Canadian family of Mark Fortune and became very fond of his daughter Alice, prompting him to cancel his tickets aboard the Mauretania and purchase tickets for the maiden voyage of the Titanic.

On the night of the sinking, Sloper was playing bridge with other men when the Titanic struck an iceberg and began to sink. At first, he didn't pay much attention to the turmoil on deck but as time passed he decided to leave the room and go up to deck. Since he thought that the Titanic was "unsinkable", he first refused to leave, but ultimately gave in after insistence by actress Dorothy Gibson who urged him to go with her aboard lifeboat #7. After the disaster, he credited her with saving his life.

On April 19, 1912, one day after arriving in New York City aboard the RMS Carpathia, a tabloid newspaper identified him as one of the passengers who had dressed in women's clothing to get their spot in the lifeboats. Sloper would spend the rest of his life denying the accusations.

== Life after the Titanic ==
After the disaster, Sloper became a managing partner of a private investment firm.

He married Helen Tallmadge Lindenberg on February 26, 1915, in Columbus, Ohio and brought up her three daughters from a previous marriage.

William Sloper died on May 1, 1955.
