= RMS Adriatic =

British ocean liner

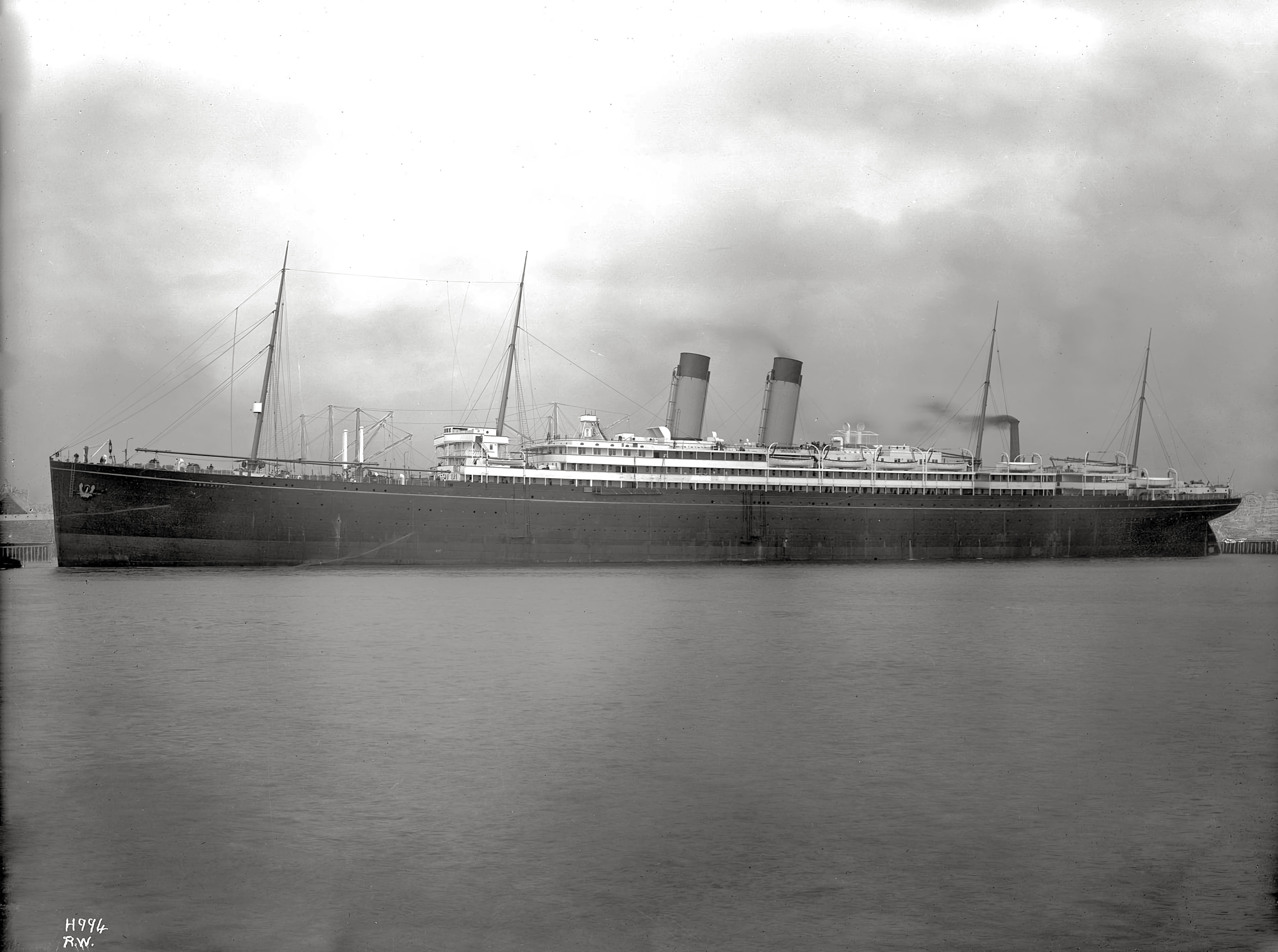
- RMS Adriatic underway in Belfast harbour, April 1907

History

United Kingdom
- Name: RMS Adriatic
- Namesake: Adriatic Sea
- Owner: Oceanic Steam Nav Co.
- Operator: 1907 – 1934: White Star Line; 1934: Cunard-White Star Line
- Port of registry: Liverpool
- Route: Liverpool–Queenstown–New York City (1907) (1911–1919) (1922–1934); Southampton-Cherbourg-New York City (1907–1911) (1919–1921)
- Builder: Harland and Wolff, Belfast
- Yard number: 358
- Laid down: 18 November 1902
- Launched: 20 September 1906
- Completed: 25 April 1907
- Maiden voyage: 8 May 1907
- In service: 1907
- Out of service: 24 February 1934
- Identification: UK official number 1294067; Code letters HKNW (until 1933); Call sign GLSJ (1934 onward)
- Nickname(s): "Finest Of Four"
- Fate: Scrapped in Onomichi, 1935

General characteristics
- Class & type: Big Four
- Type: Ocean liner
- Tonnage: 24,541 GRT, 15,638 NRT
- Length: 729 ft (222 m)
- Beam: 75.6 ft (23.0 m)
- Depth: 55.6 ft (16.9 m)
- Decks: 10
- Installed power: 16 000 hp
- Propulsion: 2 × Quadruple-expansion engines; 2 × Propellers
- Speed: 17 knots (31 km/h; 20 mph) (service), 19 knots (35 km/h; 22 mph) (maximum)
- Range: 5000 nmi
- Boats & landing craft carried: 20 lifeboats
- Capacity: 2,825 passengers: 425 First Class; 500 Second Class; 1900 Third Class; 51,120 cu ft (1,448 m^{3}) refrigerated cargo
- Crew: 567

RMS Adriatic was a British ocean liner of the White Star Line. She was the fourth of a quartet of ships of more than 20,000 GRT, dubbed The Big Four. The Adriatic was the only one of the four which was never the world's largest passenger ship. However, she was the largest, the fastest, and the most luxurious of the Big Four, being the first ocean liner to have an indoor swimming pool and Victorian-style Turkish baths.

The service career of Adriatic began on the brand new route from Southampton to New York City before joining, from 1911, her sister ships on the secondary route from Liverpool. They were in fact slow liners intended to provide a service at moderate prices. When World War I broke out, the Adriatic was among the ships that continued their civilian transatlantic service, while carrying many provisions. In 1917, she was requisitioned and served as a troop transport.

After the war, Adriatic was refitted several times and was gradually used for cruises, which became her main services in the 1930s. When the Cunard Line and White Star Line merged in 1934, she was quickly deemed unnecessary and sold for scrapping, which happened in Osaka, Japan the following year.

== Conception and construction ==
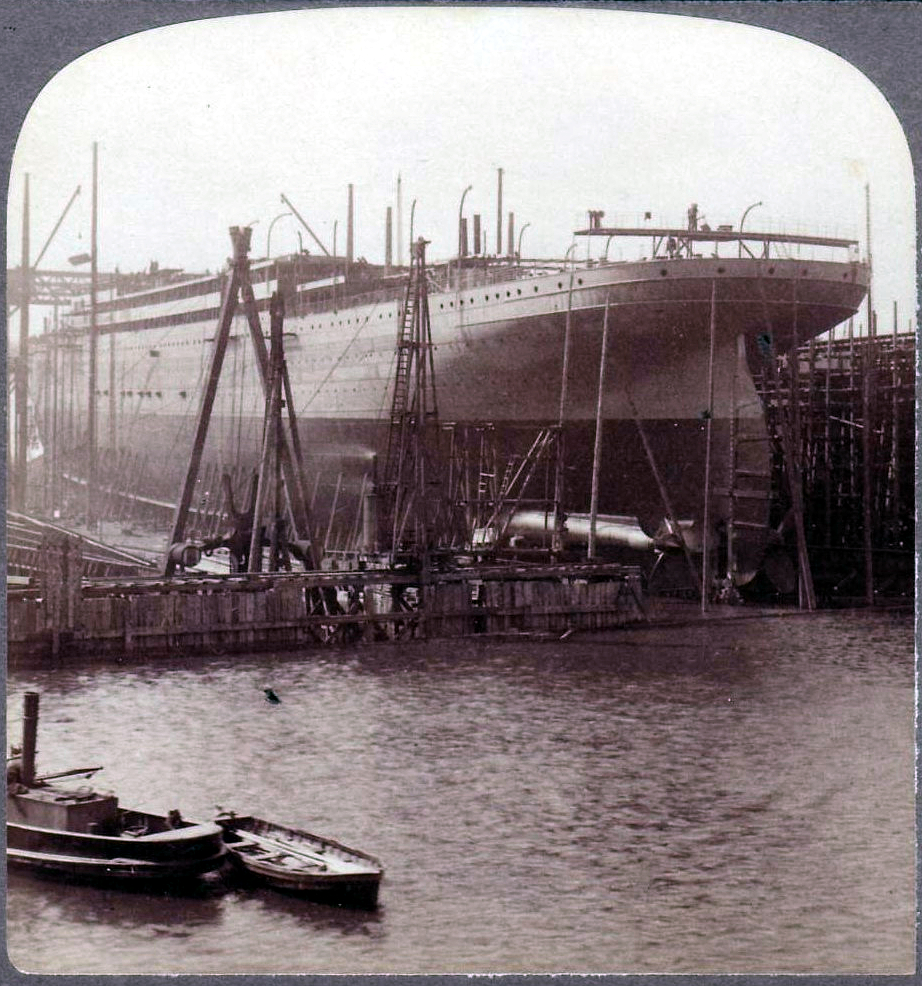
Adriatic just before launching, September 1906

At the end of the 19th century, White Star Line, under the leadership of Thomas Henry Ismay, changed its policy to embark on the construction of ships which no longer sought to dominate in the area of speed, but to transport passengers en masse and regularly on spacious and comfortable liners. This resulted in the ordering of the Big Four, four large, moderate-speed liners ordered at the start of the new century. The first, the Celtic, entered service in 1901, followed by the Cedric in 1903 and the Baltic in 1904. The fourth ship in the series, the Adriatic, was ordered from Harland and Wolff shipyards in Belfast in December 1903, but she wasn't completed until May 1907, a strangely long delay. This delay could be explained by the fact that the shipyards were building the Amerika at the same time, with a similar profile. Harland and Wolff built Adriatic on slipway No. 3 of its North Yard in Belfast, Northern Ireland.

To continue to own the largest passenger ship in the world, White Star had asked the shipyards to enlarge the Baltic during its construction; the ship measured nearly 3,000 tons more than its predecessor, but it was in turn slightly slower: its machines not having been modified. In the case of the Adriatic, it was decided to give her a size similar to the Baltic (her tonnage nevertheless surpassing that of the Baltic by a few hundred tons), but she was equipped significantly more powerful machines to allow her to maintain a better speed. Her name, in reference to the Adriatic Sea, was also given to her in reference to a previous liner of the same name which served the company for almost thirty years at the end of the 19th century.

She was launched on 20 September 1906, the same day as the Cunard Line's Mauretania. She was then completed in dry dock and delivered to her company on 25 April 1907, before sailing to Liverpool for her maiden voyage.

== Characteristics ==
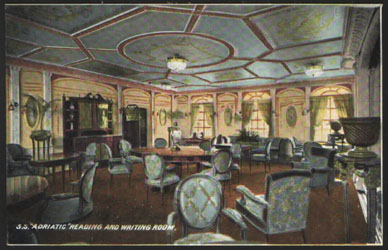
The reading and writing room aboard the Adriatic

Being the last of the Big Four, the Adriatic displayed similar dimensions to the Baltic with a 222.2 m (729 ft) length, 23 m (75.4 ft) width and 16 m (52.4 ft) draft. She was slightly bulkier than her predecessor, with a gross tonnage of 24,541 and a net tonnage of 15,638, making her one of the largest liners in the world when she entered service (the Kaiserin Auguste Victoria only exceeding her by 40 gross tons). However, her appearance remained the same as that of her three sister ships. The Adriatic therefore had a black hull with a red base, all topped by a white superstructure. Her funnels were buff-colored crowned with black cuff, and the ship had four masts intended to serve as support for the lookout's nest, as well as for the cables of the wireless telegraphy. She had four continuous decks, as well as an upper deck and several superstructures. In 1911, Adriatic further distinguished herself from her sister ships by having the front part of her promenade deck fitted with windows.

Like the other three ships in her class, the Adriatic was propelled by two propellers, the power to operate them was supplied by quadruple-expansion steam engines. Between them the two engines were rated at 1,720 NHP. 51,120 cu ft (1,448 m^{3}) of her cargo holds were refrigerated. However, in view of her higher tonnage, the White Star had her fitted with more powerful machines, capable of reaching an average speed of 17 knots, higher than that of her sister ships but still significantly lower than the fastest liners on the route. Normally, she consumed 260 tonnes of coal per day.

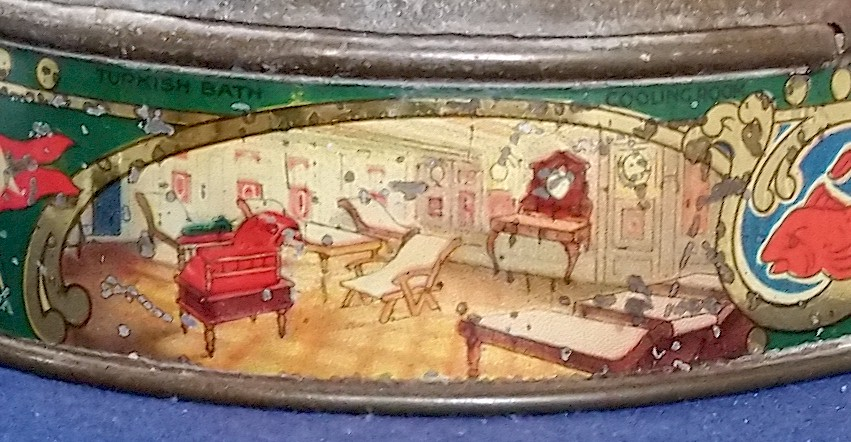
Cooling-room of the Turkish baths

The Adriatic stood out from her sister ships for the luxury of her facilities. Her first class dining room was completed in Jacobean style, topped with an intricate stained-glass dome. On A deck, she was fitted with three main public rooms for first-class passengers. The lounge was panelled in oak and fitted with stained-glass windows depicting famous poets, dramatists, and philosophers. Her smoking room was notedly larger than her sisters' and included an impressive mahogany and stained-glass panel on the forward wall. In addition to the lounge and smoking room, Adriatic featured an additional reading and writing room. This room was completed in the Adam style in tones of white, gold, and blue-grey with intricate plasterwork details.

In addition to a gymnasium, Adriatic was the first liner to be equipped with Victorian-style Turkish baths which included a large plunge pool. At the start of her career, the Adriatic could carry 425 first class, 500 second class, and 1,900 third class passengers (all accompanied by 560 crew members). From 1919, she was redesigned to carry 400 first class, 465 second class and 1,300 third class passengers. Finally, from 1928, her capacities were transformed to carry 506 cabin class, 560 tourist class, and 404 third class passengers.

== Early career ==
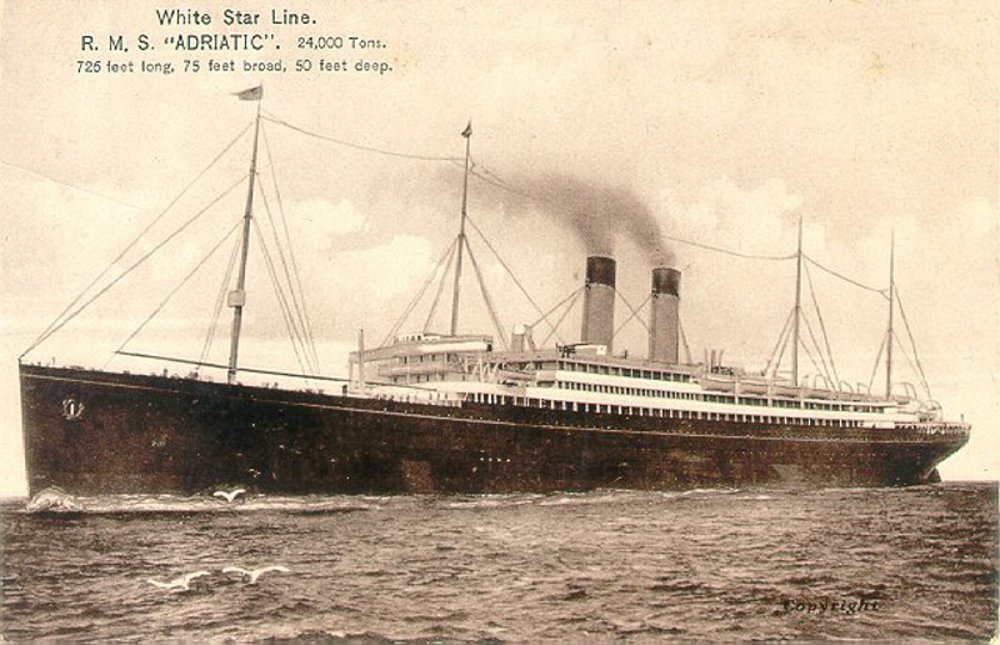
A postcard depicting the Adriatic after her 1911 refit

When the Adriatic entered service, she was celebrated by the White Star Line as "the largest ship in the world" (although the Kaiserin Auguste Victoria overtook her by 40 tons), and the company organized a departure with great fanfare for her maiden voyage from Liverpool to New York City on 8 May 1907, arriving in New York on 16 May 1907 with 2,502 passengers onboard (365 first class, 335 second class and 1,802 third class), completing the crossing in 7 days, 1 hour and 45 minutes at an average speed of 17.02 knots. The liner sailed under the command of Captain Edward Smith, who transferred from the Baltic.

After her maiden voyage, she was transferred to the Southampton – New York route, arriving in Southampton to a very warm welcome on the evening of 30 May 1907 after briefly calling at Plymouth and Cherbourg, and inaugurating White Star's Southampton service on 5 June 1907. She was the first White Star liner to use Southampton's newly built dock, named the "White Star Dock." (In 1922 it was renamed the "Ocean Dock.") This port, hitherto little frequented by British companies, was indeed chosen to serve as the base for the new express service desired by White Star, in view of the arrival of its Olympic-class liners. It also had the advantage of allowing a French stopover in Cherbourg. The Adriatic was thus assigned to this new service alongside the Oceanic, the Teutonic and the Majestic. At the same time, Liverpool becomes a secondary port of departure for services provided by the Baltic, the Cedric, the Celtic, and the Arabic. The Adriatic ran the Southampton route until 1911 when RMS Olympic replaced her. Adriatic then returned to the Liverpool route.

During this service, the Adriatic proved to be very popular with customers for her luxurious facilities despite a lower service speed than that of her Southampton running mates. An incident occurred on 10 October 1908, when it was discovered that four crew members were stealing passenger luggage and concealing it in the ship for subsequent resale. Their booty is estimated at £4,000, a very significant sum for the time. Another incident occurred in November 1909, when the liner ran aground in the entrance to the Ambrose Channel on its way to New York, then in August 1910 when the liner's stokers mutinied in Southampton. On 26 June 1911, following the entry into service of the Olympic, the Adriatic made her last crossing from Southampton before joining her sister ships on the Liverpool route. She remained there until World War I, although she also made cruises between New York and the Mediterranean during the winter of 1911.

Adriatic sailed from Liverpool on 18 April 1912 and arrived in New York on 27 April 1912. Some of Titanic's rescued passengers and crew returned to Britain aboard her, departing from New York on 2 May 1912. The passengers included White Star Line chairman J. Bruce Ismay and the ship's four surviving officers, Charles Lightoller, Herbert Pitman, Joseph Boxhall, and Harold Lowe. Also on board was Millvina Dean, the disaster's youngest and, eventually, last living survivor, and her family.

Alexander Agassiz died in 1910 while a passenger on the Adriatic.

== World War I ==
When World War I broke out, the Adriatic and the Baltic continued to provide regular service on the Liverpool route while other White Star liners were requisitioned. They were quickly joined by three ships of the Red Star Line, the Vaderland, the Zeeland and the Lapland. The Adriatic's large cargo hold enabled her to carry large quantities of provisions in wartime, but U.S. authorities, then neutral in the conflict, viewed the ship with suspicion, fearing she might make a secret stopover in Halifax to recover Canadian troops. From 12 April 1917 to 28 February 1919, the ship served under the Liner Requisition Scheme and carried troops and ammunition across the Atlantic after the entry by the United States into the war.

During the war, the bunkers of the Adriatic were often used to supply the Royal Navy with fuel. During this period, on 26 January 1918, while docked at Pier 60 in New York, she was the victim of a fire when barrels of oil stored on her deck caught fire. The firefighters managed to control the flames by flooding the bridge and throwing the burnt barrels into the sea. When the war was over, the liner was fully refurbished, and her facilities were modified to carry fewer passengers.

== Later career and demise ==
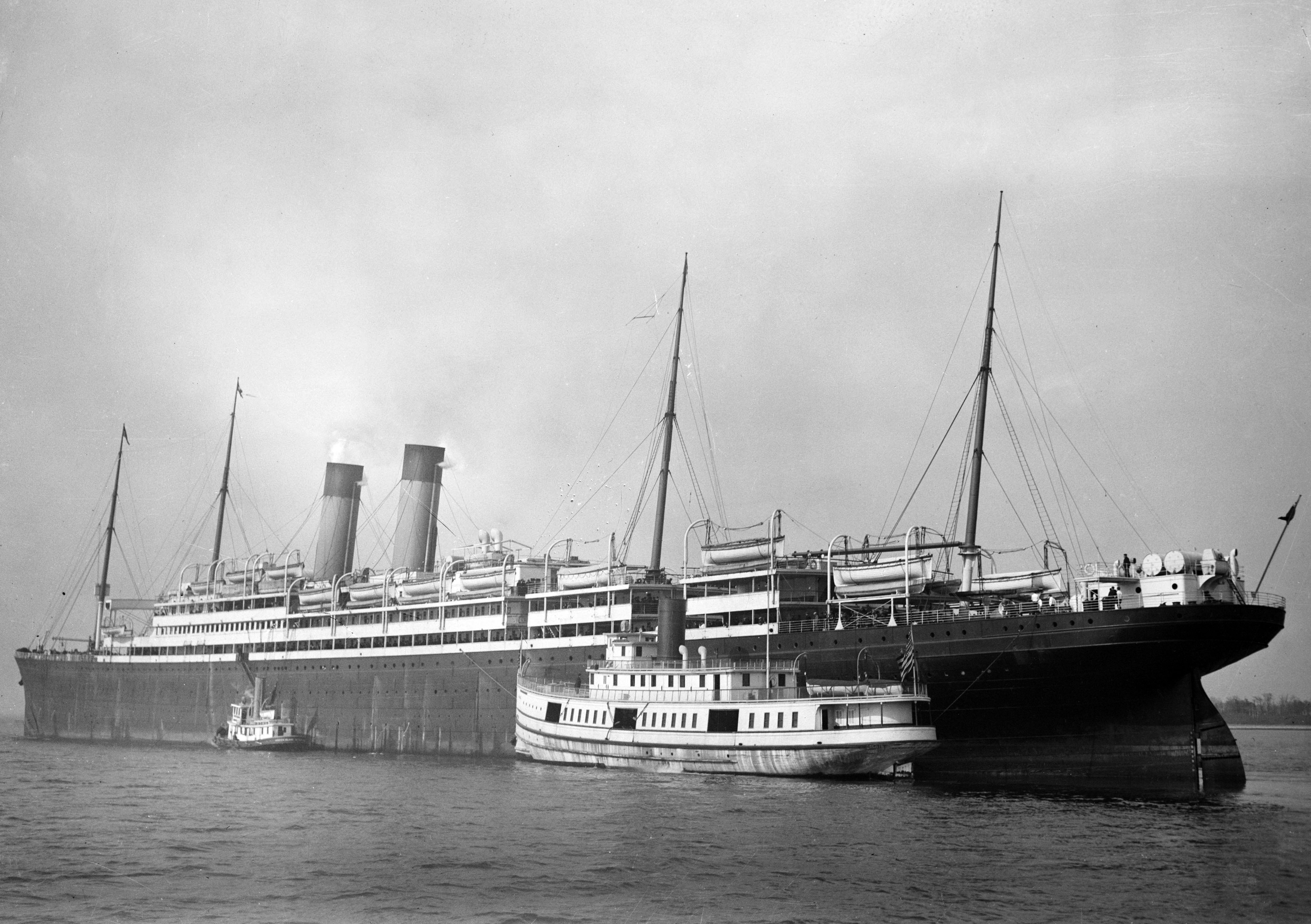
View of Adriatic from the stern, between c. 1910–15

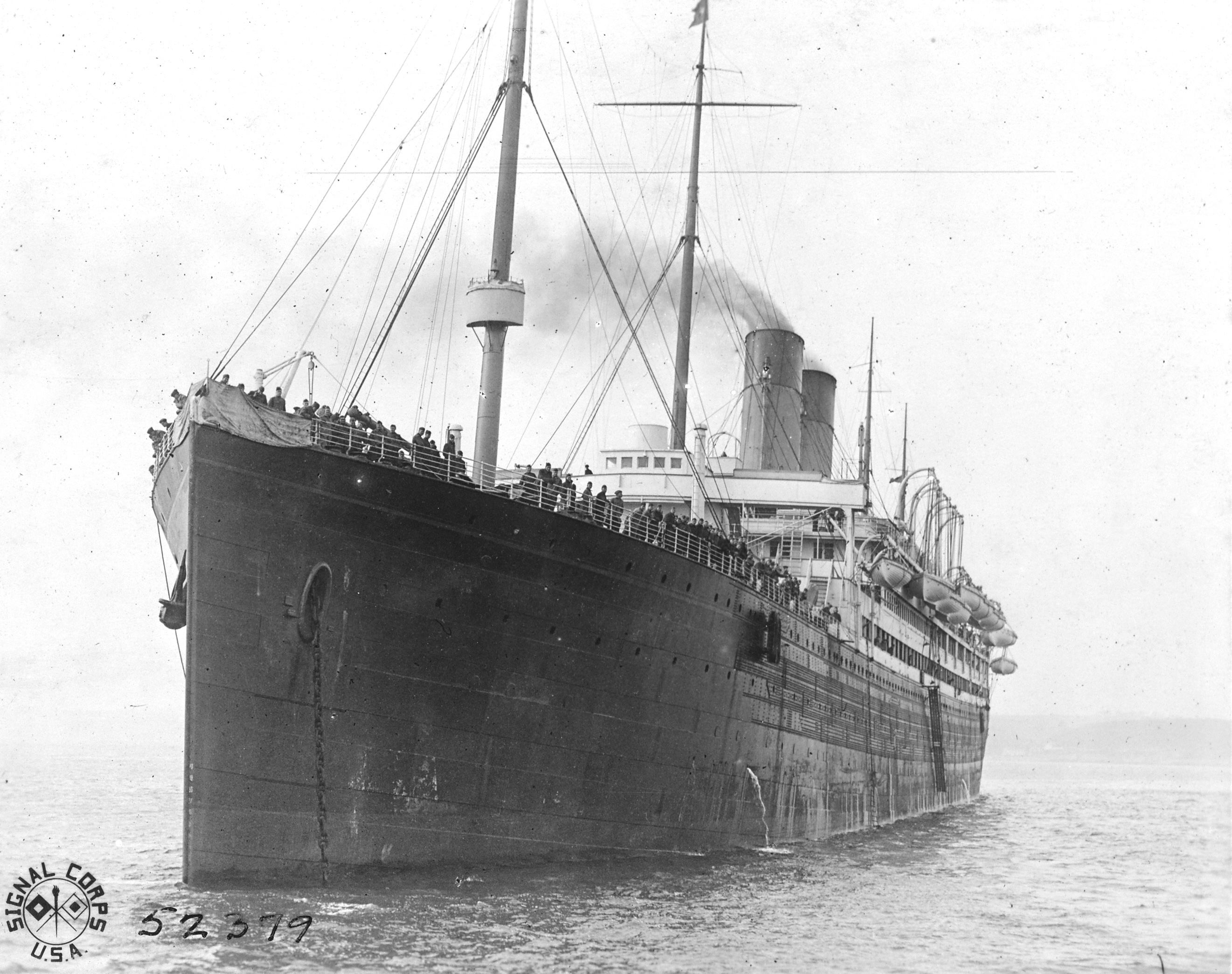
The Adriatic in Brest, France, January 1919

The Adriatic returned to service on 3 September 1919, once again on the Southampton-Cherbourg-New York service, reopening the route along with the Lapland, to ensure provisional service pending the return of requisitioned ships and the arrival of new liners. In December, the Lapland was returned to Red Star Line service. From January through June 1920, Adriatic maintained the Southampton service on her own, until the Olympic returned to service on 25 June. Throughout 1920, Olympic and Adriatic made a combined 37 crossings and carried a combined 59,660 passengers for an average of 1,612 passengers per crossing. Olympic carried 28,458 passengers over 16 crossings for an average of 1,779 passengers per crossing. Adriatic carried a career high 31,202 passengers over 21 crossings for an average of 1,486 passengers per crossing. Adriatic was finally withdrawn from the Southampton route after a last crossing, on 14 December 1921, in view of the arrival of the Majestic and the Homeric. After an overhaul in Belfast, she rejoined her sisters on the Liverpool route on 13 May 1922.

On a westbound voyage at 01:30 on 10 August 1922 near Cobh, the Adriatic suffered a gas explosion in her No. 3 hold, which she was using as a reserve coal bunker. The explosion killed five crewmen, severely injured another three, tore the hatch off the hold, broke and twisted girders and beams, and started a coal fire. Some of the dead and injured were stokers who had gone into the hold to work coal for her furnaces. One was an electrician, Leslie Ablett, who was rigging a cluster of electric lights by which the stokers were to work. Three were stokers who had been sleeping in the open on the hatch cover because it was a hot summer night. One of the stokers sleeping on the hatch cover was blown overboard Two liners, CGT's Lafayette and United States Lines' Reliance, changed course to come to Adriatic's assistance. Adriatic's crew fought and extinguished the fire. Her Second engineer, James Corrigan, entered the burning hold and rescued two injured men. At 03:55 Adriatic's wireless operator signalled that there was no further danger, so Lafayette and Reliance resumed their normal courses. The injured were treated in the ship's sick bay. Two of the ship's stewardesses were trained nurses and helped to tend the injured and dying. All of the dead and injured were from Liverpool. Before Adriatic reached New York, her passengers raised $7,000 to help their families. Adriatic reached New York on 13 August. Marine insurance agents came aboard and assessed the damage at less than $1,000. Temporary repairs were made before she began her return voyage to Liverpool on 19 August.

From 1923 onwards, the Big Four made regular stops in Boston before arriving in New York. In 1925, the Adriatic was chartered by Welsh people living in the United States who wanted to go to the Eisteddfod Genedlaethol. In May of the same year, and despite her being eighteen years of age, she broke her speed record by crossing between New York and Liverpool in 7 days and 6 minutes, at an average speed of 17.86 knots. At the same time, with less transatlantic traffic, the Adriatic was increasingly used for cruises. In 1928, when she returned from the Mediterranean, she was reconverted again, this time to become a "cabin class" ship offering more affordable rates. Making her first crossing in this capacity on 28 April 1928, she quickly met great success in this area. In late 1929, Adriatic underwent a refit with improvements to her cabin class accommodations and the installation of a new lounge in tourist-third cabin.

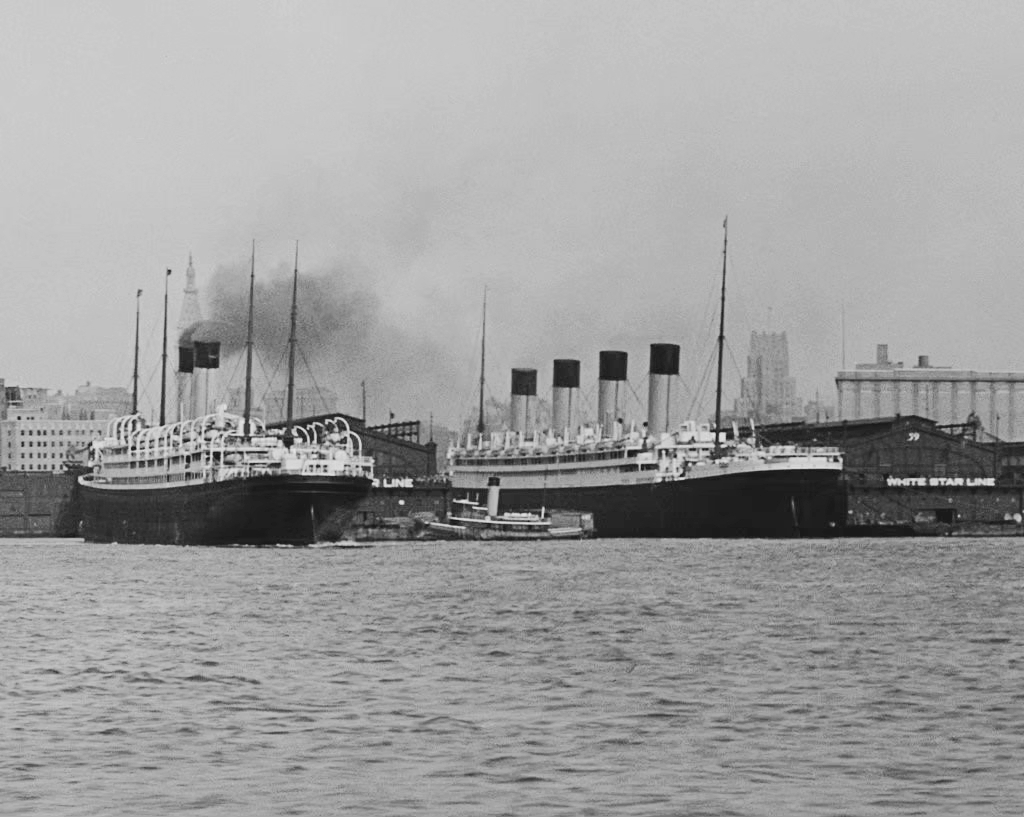
Adriatic and Olympic in New York harbor, October 1932

In 1929, cruises no longer managed to be profitable enough. The Adriatic was put to rest in Liverpool throughout the winter as the economic crisis erupted. She was now only used during the summer. The arrival of the Britannic and the Georgic further contributed to rendering the Adriatic redundant as these ships proved to be profitable whilst 'The Big Four' sustained losses. From 3 May 1930, Adriatic began monthly calls at Glasgow and Belfast in place of Queenstown. She served as an experimental ground for a very low-cost weekend cruise in the summer of 1931, but the operation was inconclusive and her September cruises were cancelled. In 1932, the Cedric was scrapped. She was followed the following year by the Baltic. Nevertheless, the company decided to keep the Adriatic as a reserve ship, as the British economy seemed to recover little by little. The following summers were not more prolific and the liner only made a few cruises off the Iberian Peninsula and occasional crossings of the Atlantic.

In 1934, Adriatic's code letters HKNW were superseded by the call sign GLSJ.

On 24 February 1934, the Adriatic made her last transatlantic crossing. After Calgaric's successful 1933 "Peace Cruise" in the Baltic, in 1934, the British Boy Scouts and Girl Guides chartered her for a similar cruise with Robert Baden-Powell on board in the Mediterranean, under the command of Commander CP Freeman, RD. Adriatic sailed from Liverpool on 29 March 1934, and called at Gibraltar, Villefranche-sur-Mer, Malta, Algiers, and Lisbon. During that spring, White Star Line merged with its rival Cunard Line forming Cunard-White Star Line. The Adriatic became part of the new fleet, but was clearly superfluous given her age. After a final voyage in September, she was taken off service, and sold in November to Japanese shipbreakers for £48,000. She left Liverpool for the last time on 19 December 1934, her longest voyage ever; to be scrapped at Osaka, Japan, in 1935.

== See also ==
- List of White Star Line ships

== Bibliography ==
- Anderson, Roy Claude (1964). White Star. Prescot: T. Stephenson & Sons Ltd. OCLC 3134809.
- Chirnside, Mark (2016). The 'Big Four' of the White Star Fleet: Celtic, Cedric, Baltic & Adriatic. Stroud, Gloucestershire: The History Press. ISBN 9780750965972.
- de Kerbrech, Richard (2009). Ships of the White Star Line. Shepperton: Ian Allan Publishing. ISBN 978-0-7110-3366-5.
- Eaton, John; Haas, Charles (1989). Falling Star, Misadventures of White Star Line Ships. Patrick Stephens Ltd. ISBN 1-85260-084-5.
- Haws, Duncan (1990). White Star Line. Merchant Fleets. Vol. 17. Hereford: TCL Publications. ISBN 0-946378-16-9. OCLC 50214776.
