= Gjenvick-Gjønvik Archives =

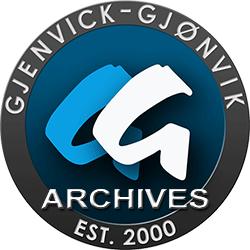
- Founded: 2000; 25 years ago
- Founder: Paul K. Gjenvick
- Purpose: Genealogy, archive
- Headquarters: Milwaukee, Wisconsin
- Website: ggarchives.com

The GG Archives is a privately held archive containing materials related to genealogy, military history, and other historical ephemera dating from the mid-1800s through 2000. The site hosts over 7,000 static web pages and 20,000 images. The collections are composed of artificial collections of historial materials in twelve topical areas.

Based in Milwaukee, Wisconsin, the GG Archives provides free access to historical ephemera, articles, and photographs on specific topics, with a primary focus on genealogy-related materials. These resources are intended for genealogists, historians, teachers, and researchers, covering historical periods primarily from the 1880s through the 1950s.

Launched in January 2000, the online collections include materials on US immigration, ocean travel, military history (with a focus on the US Navy), epicurean, vintage fashions, the Works Progress Administration (WPA), and the Spanish flu pandemic of 1918-19.

The site contains original steamship passage tickets or contracts, primarily for transatlantic voyages, between 1854 and 1956. These primary source documents provide valuable insights for illustrating family histories and are also used as educational resources K–12 students studying history and social studies.

Known for their passenger lists collections, the site also provides detailed information and images related to ships in the "Immigrant Ships" section under "Ocean Travel."

Primary source materials can be found throughout the Archives' Immigration section (covering US and Canadian immigration). These include passenger lists and immigrant inspection cards, which are often used as educational tools in various academic settings and topics.

The collections also include materials on vintage fashions, culinary history, and historical articles on various topics, including a Q&A on the World War I draft.

== Major collections ==
Based on their top navigation links, the Archives' major collections include:

Immigration: This collection focuses on US immigration through primary and other sources The Archives document the immigrant experience with essential records, articles, and information on mass migration of immigrants from primarily European countries to North America. Included are immigrant documents, steamship passage tickets records related to Ellis Island and Castle Garden immigrant stations, immigration laws, materials on steerage. Ocean Travel: This section explores daily life aboard steamships from the 1870s through the 1950s, using historical articles illustrated with photographs and period imagery. It features extensive materials related to the Cunard Line, vintage ocean liner menus, RMS Titanic collections, historical steamship lines, biographies of sea captains', ports of call, and promotional materials such as travel brochures and Student Third Class Association (STCA) materials.

Military Archives: While primarily focused on the United States Navy, this collection also includes significant materials on World War I and the US Army. A notable portion consists of US Naval Training Center graduation yearbooks, particularly from Great Lakes and San Diego.

Epicurean: This collection covers historical culinary topics, including food, desserts, cooking methods, family recipes, vintage ads (epicurean), and historical wedding feasts

Vintage Fashions 1880s - 1930s This section highlights period clothing styles for women, teenagers, and children, particularly in relation to steamship travel and luxury accommodations.

Entertainment During the Steamship Era: This category features Brochures, flyers, images, and articles on entertainment aboard ocean liners. A portion of the collection also focuses on early 20th-century motion picture production.

Library: A diverse collection of books, primarily covering reference materials, genealogy, maritime history, and military topics.

Other notable collections: This section includes materials on the Works Progress Administration (WPA), the Influenza Pandemic of 1918-1919, and biographical collections related to Dr. Edward Jenner and Thomas A. Edison, as well as the Bangor Punta Archives.

== Collection highlights ==
- The World War One Draft – Photograph documenting the first draft lottery of 1917.
- Immigrant ID Tag Identification tag from the Holland-America Line's TSS Rijndam, dated 26 September 1923
- King George Letter – Letter addressed to soldiers of the United States, April 1918
- Black Ball Line Passage Ticket - Ticket for Mr. Nicholas Fish on the packet ship Yorkshire, 1859. See Black Ball Line.
- World War I Booklet – "Where Do We Go from Here? This is the Real Dope", by William Brown Meloney, issued to discharged soldiers.
- White Star Line Brochure - "The Famous Big 4 of the New York Liverpool Service"
- Painting of the first cowpox vaccination – Depiction of Dr. Edward Jenner administering the vaccination, by Georges Gaston Melinque.

== Founder ==
Paul K. Gjenvick, MAS, an archivist, holds a bachelor's degree in accounting from Minnesota State University and a master's degree in archival studies from Clayton State University.
