= Big Four (White Star Line) =

Class of ocean liners built 1901–1905

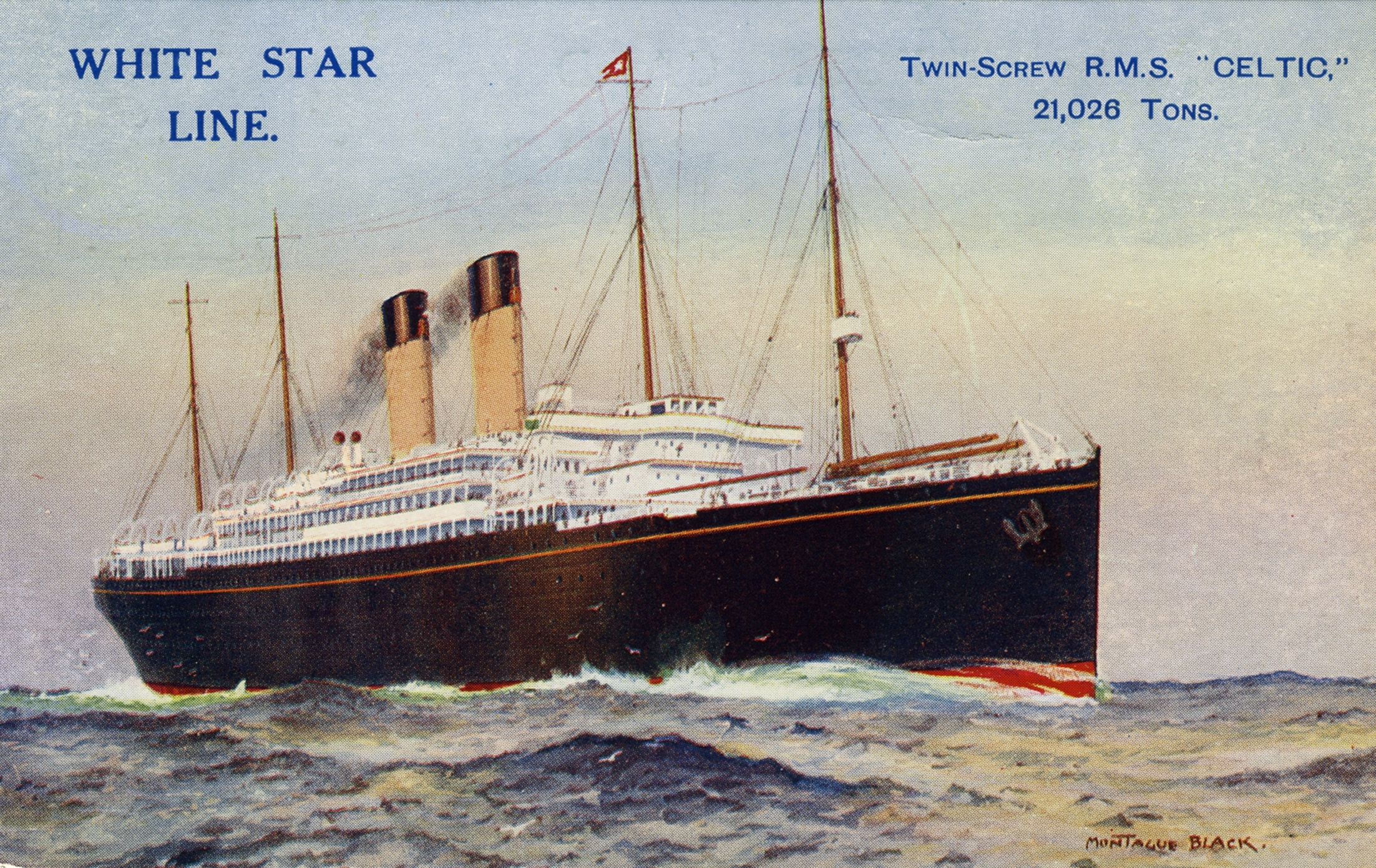
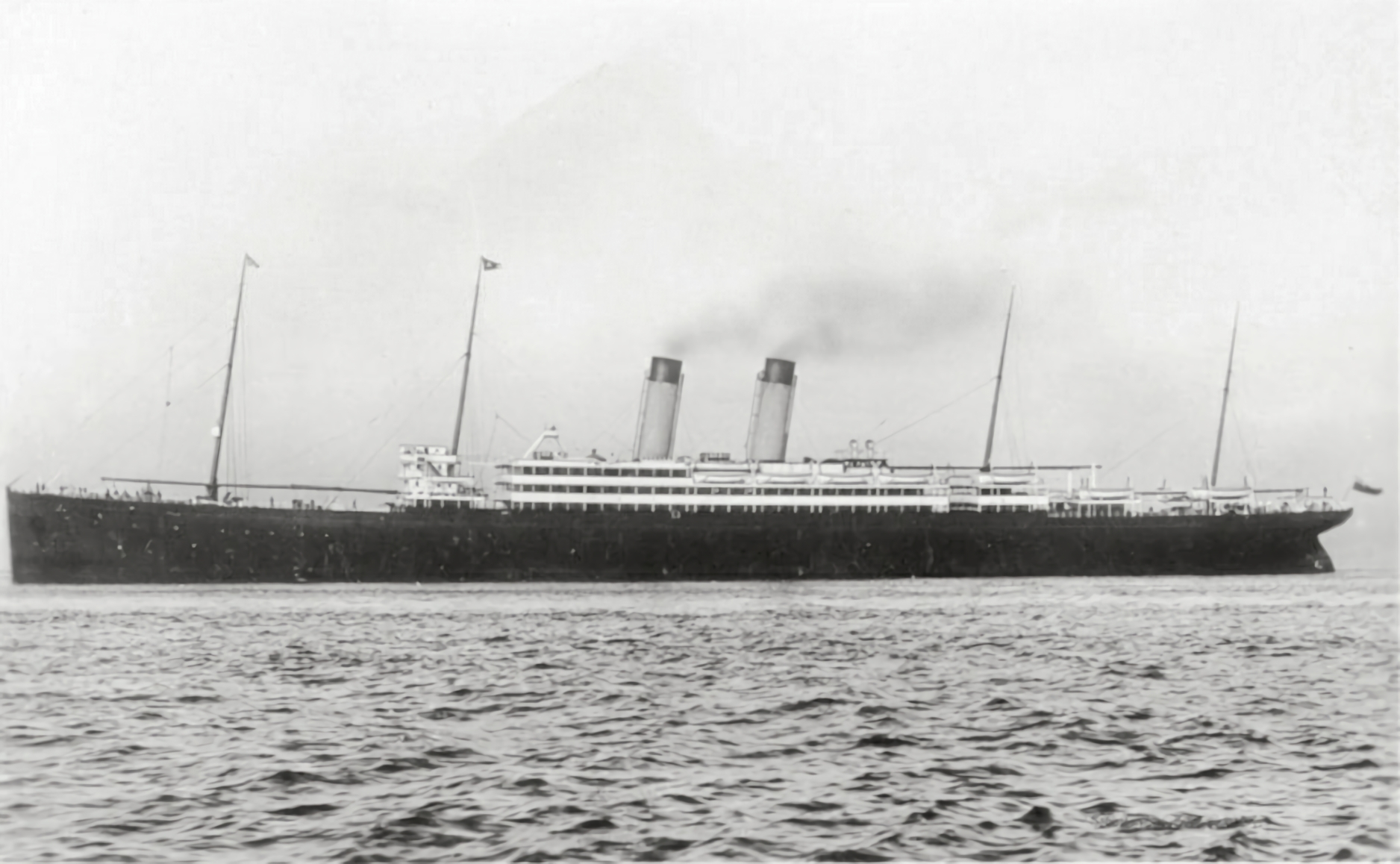
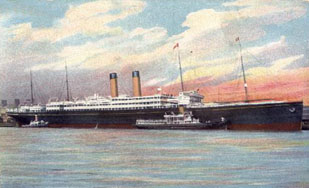
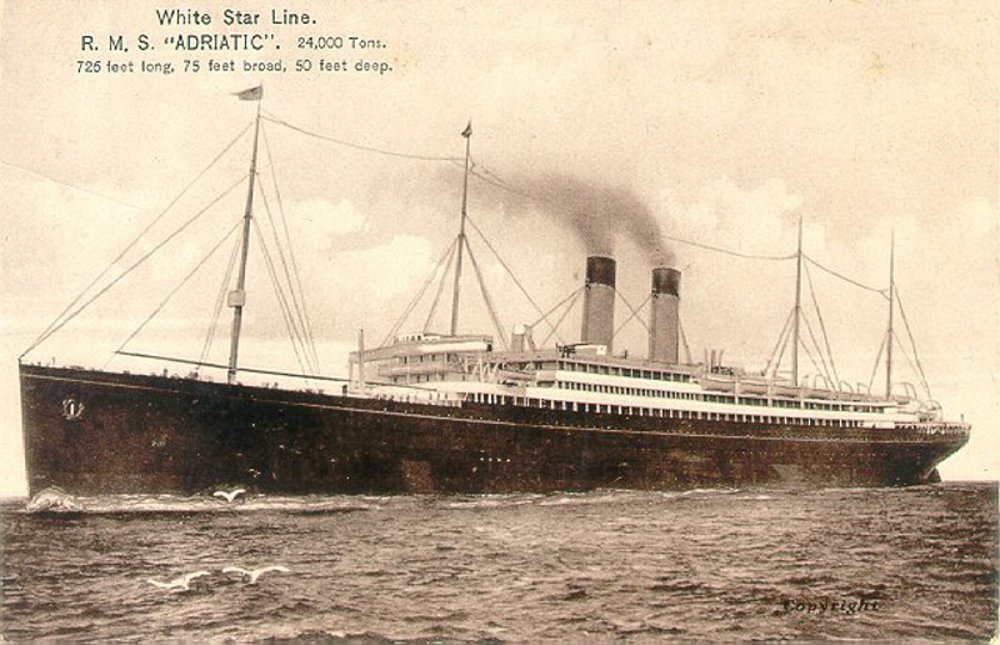
- RMS Celtic RMS Cedric RMS Baltic RMS Adriatic

Class overview
- Builders: Harland and Wolff, Belfast
- Operators: White Star Line
- Preceded by: RMS Oceanic
- Succeeded by: Athenic class
- Built: 1901–1906
- In service: 1901–1934
- Planned: 4
- Completed: 4
- Lost: 1
- Retired: 3

General characteristics
- Type: Ocean liner
- Tonnage: 20,904 GRT–24,541 GRT, 13,449 NRT-15,638 NRT
- Length: 700 to 730 ft (210 to 220 m)
- Beam: 75.3 ft (23.0 m)
- Depth: 44 ft (13 m)
- Propulsion: Steam Quadruple expansion engines, powering two propellers, total 16,000 hp (12,000 kW)
- Speed: 17 knots (31 km/h; 20 mph)
- Capacity: c. 2,850 passengers

The "Big Four" were a quartet of early-20th-century 20,000-ton ocean liners built by the Harland & Wolff shipyard for the White Star Line, to be the largest and most luxurious ships afloat. The group consisted of Celtic, Cedric, Baltic and Adriatic.

== Origin ==
In 1899, White Star Line commissioned the RMS Oceanic, which exceeded the SS Great Eastern in length but not tonnage. After Thomas Ismay's death, the order of Oceanic's sister-ship, Olympic was cancelled. Instead, resources were transferred to the company's new project; to build the grandest fleet of ships that had ever sailed the seas, the "Big Four".

== History ==
In 1901, the White Star Line ordered a series of four ships that were to be larger than Great Eastern, terming these ships the "Big Four". The four ships were designed to have a tonnage in excess of 20,000 tons and rather than being built for speed and to compete for the Blue Riband, were designed to be more luxurious than their rivals.

The first of the four vessels was named Celtic, and was ordered by Thomas Ismay before his death.Celtic was launched on 4 April 1901 and made her maiden voyage on 26 July. She was shorter than Oceanic but was still longer than Great Eastern. When Celtic was completed, she was the largest ship yet constructed at 20,904 gross register tons (GRT), making her the first ship to surpass 20,000 gross tons.

The project was followed by the Cedric, which was launched on 21 August 1902 and made her maiden voyage on 11 February 1903. At the time she was launched she was the biggest moving object ever built at 21,073 gross register tons.

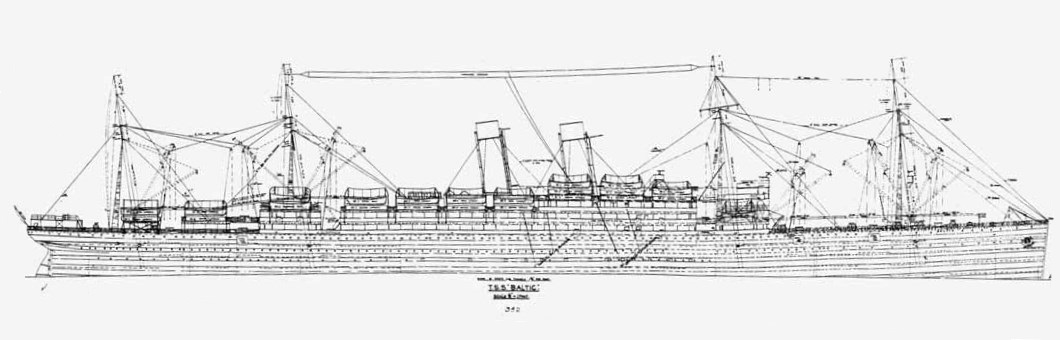
Plans of Baltic, c. 1903.

The project was followed by the Baltic, which was launched on 21 November 1903 and made her maiden voyage on 29 June 1904. She was the largest ship in the world at 23,876 gross register tons until 1905, when the HAPAG's 24,581 gross register ton Kaiserin Auguste Victoria surpassed her in tonnage.

The popularity of White Star's "Big Four" was eventually overtaken by Cunard's Lusitania and Mauretania, both of which were larger than the Adriatic, at 24,541 gross register tons the largest and also the fastest of the "Big Four", but which was superseded in size before her launch by Lusitania. Lastly the Red Star Line's SS Lapland, at a more economical 17,000 tons, was a virtual sister ship to the "Big Four" in her layout and dimensions. Lapland was also built by Harland & Wolff.

== Features ==
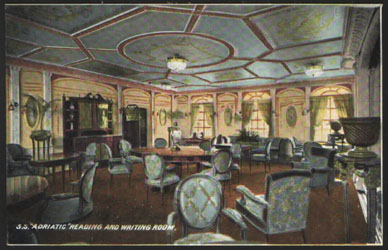
Adriatic's first class reading and correspondence room. Similar rooms were furnished on her sister ships.

The "Big Four" had a gross tonnage of between 20,904 and 24,541 gross tons, and a net tonnage of between 13,449 and 15,638, with Baltic and Adriatic being considerably larger than Celtic and Cedric. However, Adriatic, which was the largest of the four, was also the only one not to have held the title of largest passenger ship in world. The four ships were propelled by two propellers driven by steam quadruple expansion and reached an average speed of 16 knots (30 km/h; 18 mph), although their maximum speeds varied.

The silhouettes of the four vessels were similar, black hull with red keel and white superstructure, with an "island" bridge separated from the rest of the superstructure. They were provided with four masts (two front and two rear) which supported the cables of wireless telegraphy. The two funnels were buff topped with a black sleeve.

The vessels had luxury on an unprecedented scale, with a dining room dominated by a glass roof, a lounge with a reading and writing room with many books and periodicals, also adorned with large picture windows, a covered promenade deck, a smoking room decorated stained glass and in the case of Adriatic, an indoor pool and Victorian-style Turkish baths.

== Ships' careers ==
=== Celtic ===
Celtic was the first of the "Big Four", entering service in 1901. She was the first ship to exceed the Great Eastern in tonnage. Her career was marred by several accidents. Transformed into an auxiliary cruiser during the First World War, she struck a mine in 1917, killing 17 people. In 1918, she was torpedoed by a German submarine, but once again remained afloat. In 1925, she was in collision with another vessel, but neither ship suffered serious damage. She was involved in another collision in 1927. Finally, in 1928, she struck rocks off Cobh and was considered unrecoverable. It took five years for the ship to be completely dismantled.

=== Cedric ===
Cedric entered service in 1903. Her commercial career was divided into transatlantic crossings and cruises. When the Titanic sank, Cedric was docked in New York. After the sinking it was reported that J. Bruce Ismay, managing director of the White Star line, had attempted to arrange, by wireless with the White Star New York offices, to delay the sailing of Cedric until Carpathia arrived in port so that he and the surviving crew members of Titanic could return to England without setting foot in the United States. However Cedric sailed on schedule. During the First World War, Cedric was transformed into an auxiliary cruiser. On 29 January 1918, she collided with the Canadian Pacific ship Montreal off Morecambe Bay. Montreal was taken in tow but sank the next day 14 miles (23 km) from the Mersey Bar lightvessel. On 30 September 1923, Cedric collided with RMS Scythia of the Cunard Line in Queenstown harbour during dense fog. Neither vessel was seriously damaged. She was decommissioned in 1931 and was scrapped the following year.

=== Baltic ===
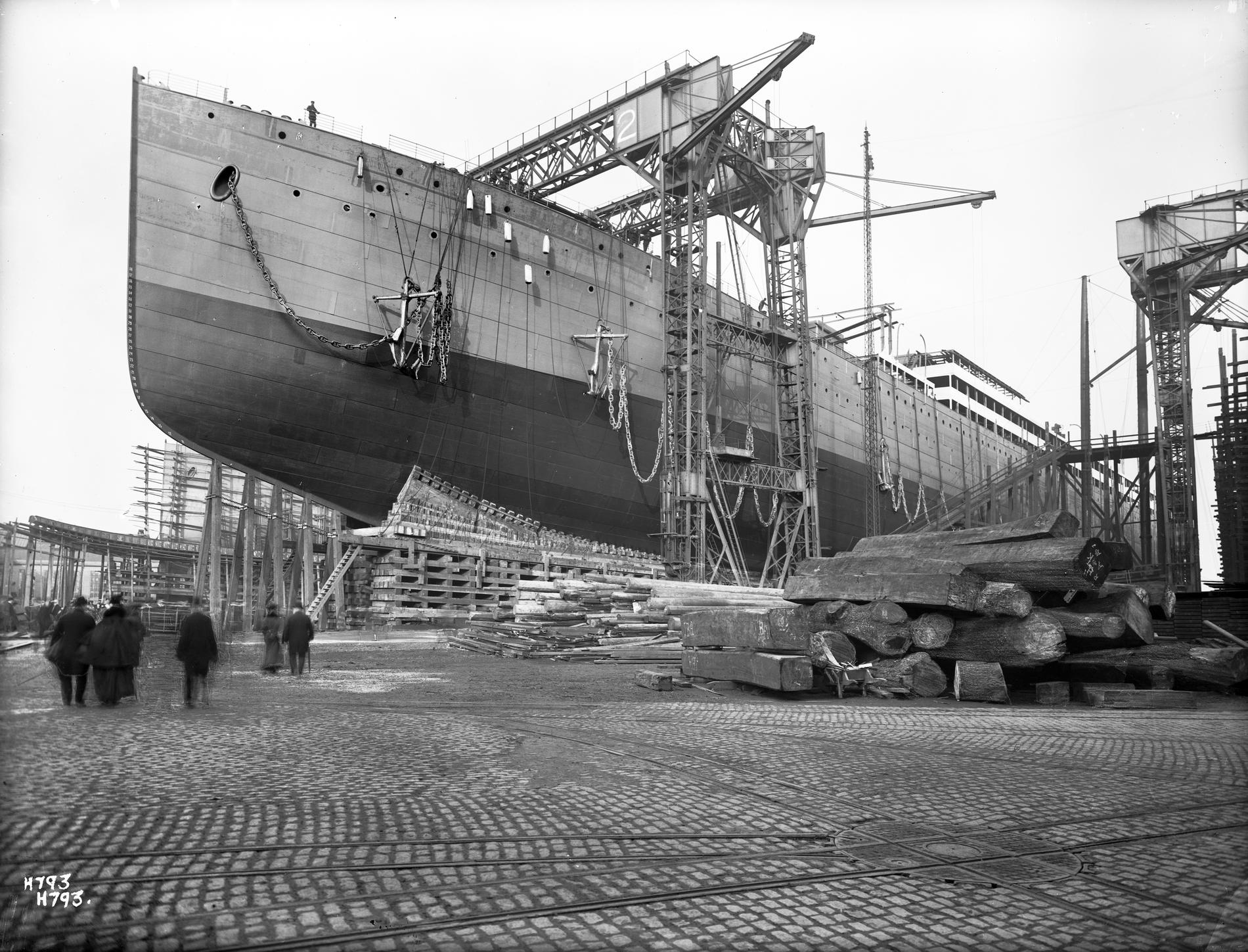
Baltic under construction, 1903

Commissioned in 1904, the Baltic was involved in rescues at sea on a number of occasions. In 1909, she received a call for help from the RMS Republic (1903), which had collided with SS Florida of Lloyd Italiano. On 15 April 1912, Baltic received the distress call from Titanic, but was unable to assist. She was also involved in a rescue on 6 December 1929, when she assisted the sinking schooner Northern Light. On 17 February 1933, she sailed for Osaka where she was scrapped. Baltic was commonly accompanied by White Star tender SS Magnetic, which serviced her throughout most of her career. The two ships appear together on many White Star Line postcards.

=== Adriatic ===
Adriatic entered service in 1907. She was the largest, the fastest, and the most luxurious of the Big Four, being the first ocean liner to have an indoor swimming pool and Victorian-style Turkish baths. Adriatic enjoyed a successful commercial career, which included war service during the First World War when the ship made several voyages as a troop transport. Adriatic was devoted full-time to cruising from 1933, and was retired the following year, then sold by the White Star Line for scrapping in Japan in 1935.

== Bibliography ==
- Chirnside, M. (2016). The Big Four of the White Star Fleet: Celtic, Cedric, Baltic & Adriatic. Stroud: The History Press. ISBN 978-0-7509-6597-2.
