= RMS Samaria =

Transatlantic ocean liner and Royal Mail Ship

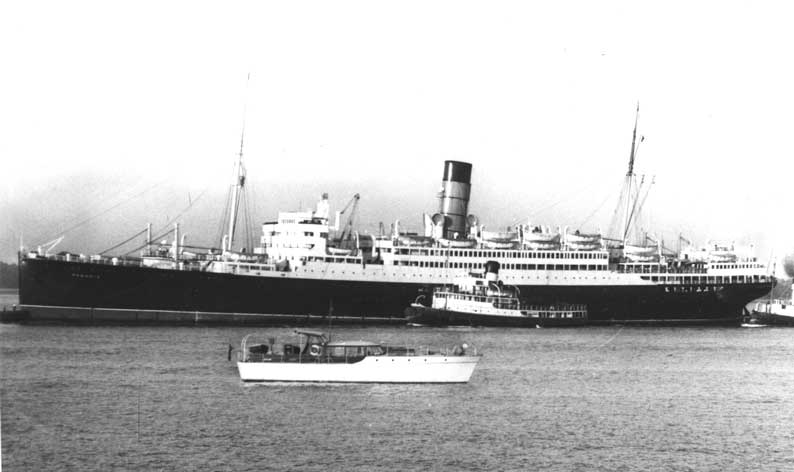

History

United Kingdom
- Name: RMS Samaria
- Namesake: Samaria
- Owner: Cunard Line
- Operator: Cunard Line
- Port of registry: Liverpool
- Route: Liverpool – various
- Builder: Cammell, Laird & Co, Birkenhead
- Yard number: 836
- Launched: 27 November 1920
- Completed: 8 April 1922
- Maiden voyage: 19 April 1922
- Identification: UK official number 145923; code letters KLWD (until 1933); call sign GJCF (1934 onward)
- Fate: Scrapped 1956

General characteristics
- Type: Ocean liner
- Tonnage: 19,602 GRT, 11,866 NRT
- Length: 601.5 ft (183.3 m)
- Beam: 73.7 ft (22.5 m)
- Draught: 54 ft 0 in (16.46 m)
- Depth: 40.7 ft (12.4 m)
- Decks: 2
- Installed power: 2,527 NHP
- Propulsion: 2 × screws; double-reduction gearing; 6 × steam turbines
- Speed: 16 kn (30 km/h; 18 mph) (service speed)
- Capacity: 315 first class, 350 second class, 1500 third class as built
- Crew: 434
- Notes: Passenger accommodations were altered several times in the ship's career.

RMS Samaria was a transatlantic ocean liner built for Cunard Line. She was completed in 1922 and served until 1955. In the Second World War she was a troopship in the Royal Navy. Samaria was scrapped in 1956. Samaria was a sister ship of RMS Scythia and half-sister of RMS Franconia.

== Building ==
Cammell Laird & Company in Birkenhead built Samaria for Cunard Line, launching her on 27 November 1920. Fitting out for service took somewhat longer than usual due to post war demands on industry but in due course Samaria entered service in April 1922. She was an intermediate liner designed with an emphasis on fuel economy, hence her service speed was about 16 knots (30 km/h; 18 mph).

== Service ==
Intended to augment Cunard's transatlantic service Samaria ran on the Liverpool to Boston and New York City route with periodic stops in Cobh, and appealed to those first and second class passengers looking for comfort at reasonable rates and who were not in a hurry. Originally the ship was intended to make a profit in the immigrant trade with third class passengers. However the end of unrestricted immigration to the United States in the mid-1920s necessitated the first of several reconfiguration of passenger accommodations as third class became "tourist."

Throughout the 1920s and 1930s Samaria was frequently employed as a cruise ship. In 1939, it ended up colliding with the RMS Aquitania, while the Aquitania was sailing in a convoy. They suffered only minor damage. In September 1940 she took part in the evacuation of children from the UK to the US under the scheme set up by the Children's Overseas Reception Board (CORB). In 1941 the ship was taken over by the Royal Navy and served as a troopship until 1948 when she was returned to Cunard and refitted for passenger service. Between 1948 and 1955 Samaria was assigned almost exclusively to the Canadian route with service to Montreal, Quebec, and Halifax along with her sister-ship RMS Scythia. In November 1955 she completed her last transatlantic crossing and was subsequently sold for scrapping, which was completed in 1956 at Inverkeithing, Scotland.
