= RMS Cedric =

British transatlantic ocean liner that operated by white star line from 1903 and 1931

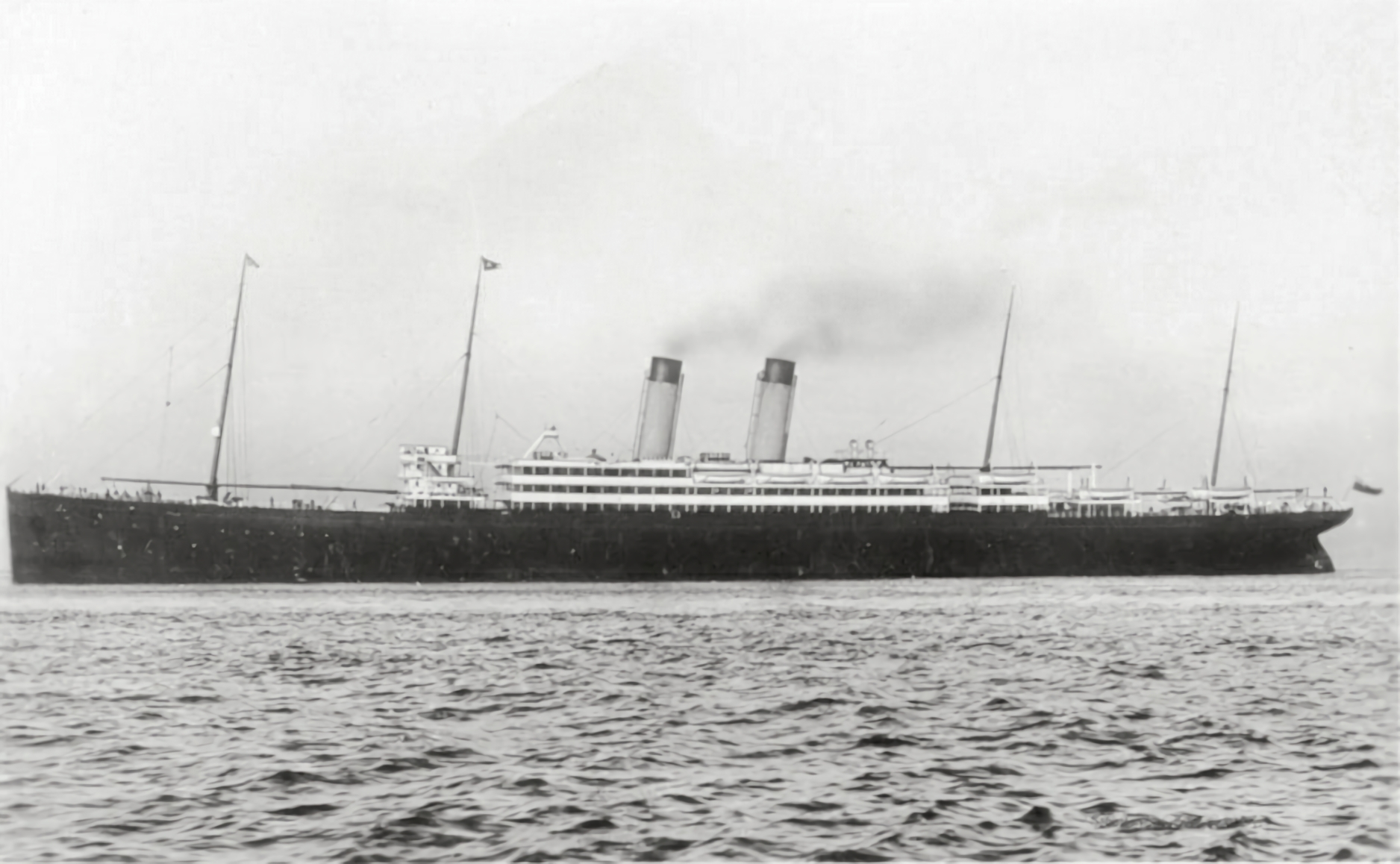
- RMS Cedric at sea in 1903

History

United Kingdom
- Name: RMS Cedric
- Operator: White Star Line
- Port of registry: Liverpool
- Route: Liverpool – New York
- Builder: Harland & Wolff, Belfast
- Yard number: 337
- Laid down: 13 October 1900
- Launched: 21 August 1902
- Completed: 31 January 1903
- Maiden voyage: 11 February 1903
- Out of service: September 1931
- Identification: UK official number 115354; code letters TSVB; by 1913: call sign MDC
- Fate: scrapped in 1932

General characteristics
- Class & type: Big-Four class
- Tonnage: 21,073 GRT, 13,520 NRT
- Length: 700 ft (213.4 m) overall; 680.9 ft (207.5 m) registered
- Beam: 75.3 ft (23.0 m)
- Depth: 44.1 ft (13.4 m)
- Decks: 4
- Installed power: 1,524 NHP; 14,000 ihp (10,000 kW)
- Propulsion: Two four-cylinder quadruple expansion reciprocating steam engines: Two screws
- Speed: 17 kn (20 mph; 31 km/h)
- Capacity: As built: 2,875 passengers (365 first, 160 second, 2,350 third)
- Crew: 486 officers and crew
- Notes: Ship colours: black hull with gold line, red boot-topping, upper works white, funnels: White Star Buff

RMS Cedric was an ocean liner owned by the White Star Line. She was the second of a quartet of ships over 20,000 tons, dubbed the Big Four, and was the largest vessel in the world at the time of her entering service. Her career, peppered with collisions and minor incidents, took place mainly on the route from Liverpool to New York.

Requisitioned as an auxiliary cruiser in World War I, Cedric carried out patrol missions until 1916, but her large size was detrimental to her assigned role. She was then transformed into a troop transport and transported soldiers from Egypt and Palestine, then from the United States in the direction of the European fronts. She then resumed civilian service in 1919.

In the 1920s Cedric faced competition from increasingly modern ships. After having been refitted several times to adapt to new clienteles, she was withdrawn from service in 1931 and scrapped the following year.

== Construction and early career ==
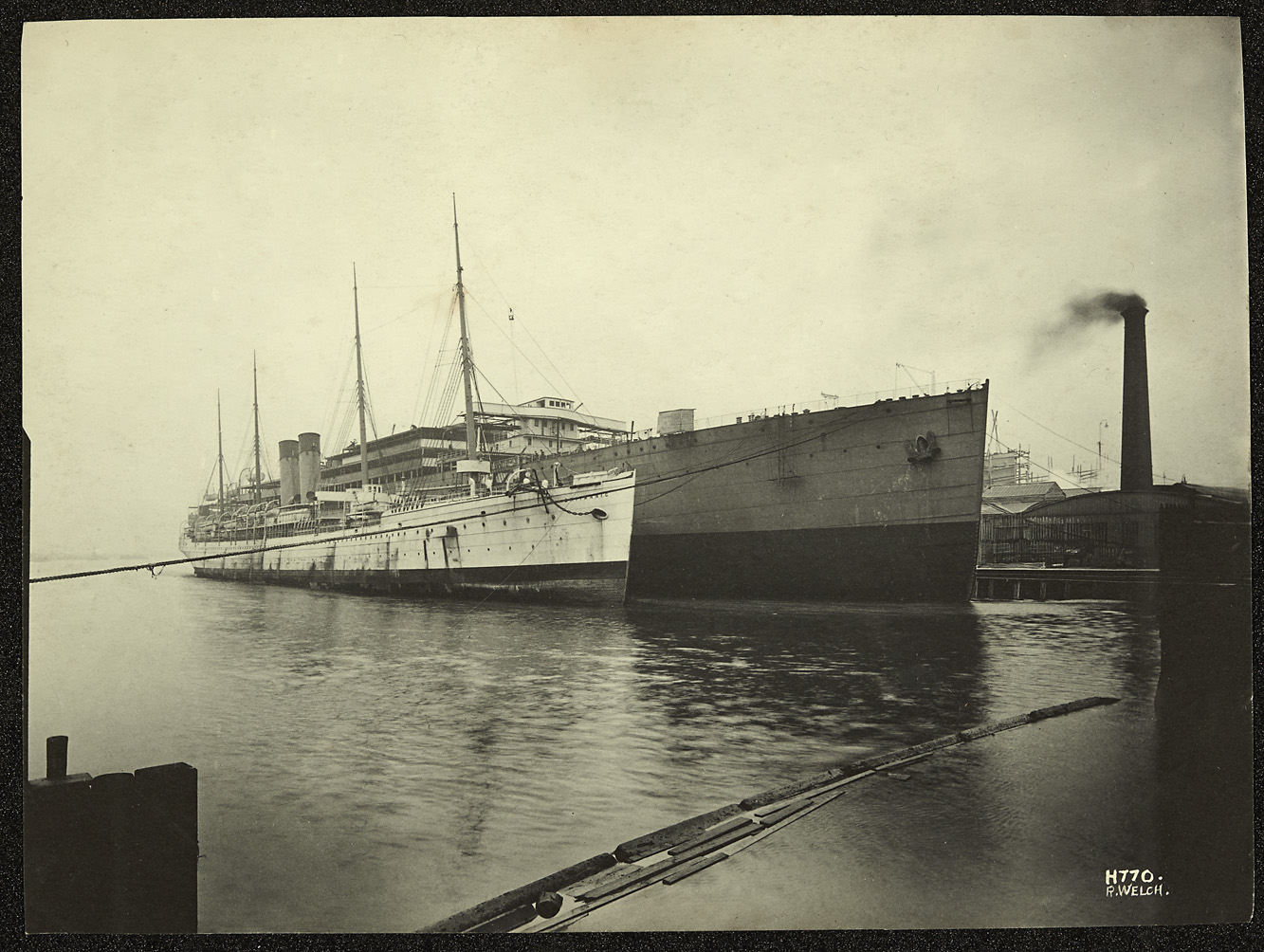
Cedric shortly after her launch. SS Britannic is seen laid up alongside her.

At the end of the 19th century, White Star Line decided to build large ships at moderate speed, in order to take advantage of the area of comfort and regularity while achieving fuel economy. The first unit of series known as the "Big Four" entered service in 1901, RMS Celtic. A second ship built on the same model was already under construction: Cedric. Built by Harland & Wolff in Belfast as yard number 337, she was launched in Belfast on 21 August 1902, in a private ceremony whose guests included William Pirrie, the chairman of Harland & Wolff and Bruce Ismay, chairman of White Star Line. A month later, a third liner was laid down, the Baltic.

== Characteristics ==
In 1901, at 20,904 GRT and 13,449 NRT, RMS Celtic was the first liner to surpass the size record set in 1860 by SS Great Eastern. Cedric's profile and dimensions were similar to Celtic's. Her lengths were 700 ft (213.4 m) overall and 680.9 ft (207.5 m) registered. Her beam was 75.3 ft (23.0 m) and her depth was 44.1 ft (13.4 m). But Cedric had a few more cabins, which increased her gross tonnage to 21,073 and her net tonnage to 13,520. Cedric had two chamois-colored funnels with a black cuff, the hull being black enhanced by a white superstructure (colors displayed by all the company's ships). The funnels were surrounded by four masts which only served to support the lookout's nest (on the front mast) and the cables of the wireless telegraphy.

Internally, Cedric was filled with and benefited from many luxury amenities of the time. The ship offered lounge, promenade deck, verandah café, reading and writing lounge decorated with large bay windows, smoking room decorated with stained glass windows and dining room topped with a glass roof. The ship also benefited from her own orchestra. Finally, comfort was improved by the low extent of the roll. When completed, the ship could accommodate 365 first-class, 160 second-class and 2,350 third-class, for a total capacity of 2,875 passengers. In 1919, her capacity was reduced and it could carry 347 first-class, 200 second-class and 1,000 third-class passengers. Finally, in 1928, she was again converted to carry 300 cabin class passengers, 385 tourist class, and 530 third-class.

The ship was propelled by two propellers powered by quadruple expansion machines generating a power of 14,000 horsepowers. She sailed at an average speed of 16 knots, and could reach a maximum speed of 19 knots. At average speed, the engines consumed 260 tonnes of coal per day, which was significantly lower than most of its competitors. Technically, Cedric stood out from her sister ships by being equipped with the new Welin-type davits (those which were subsequently fitted to many vessels such as those of the Olympic-class ocean liners), instead of the swiveling davits.

== Early career ==
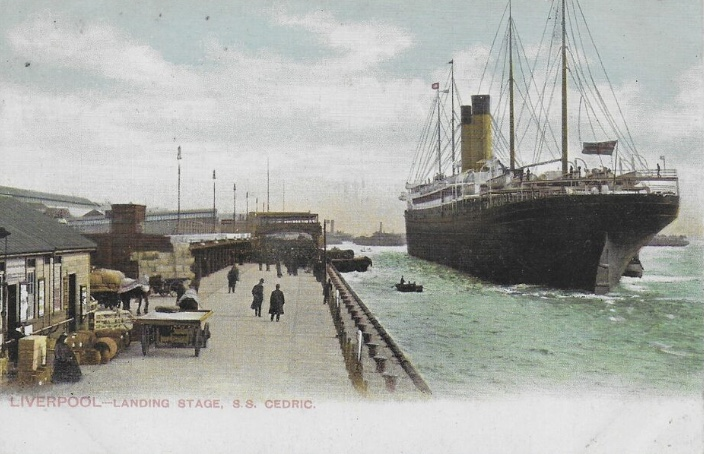
Postcard of Cedric at Liverpool, 1903

Delivered on 31 January 1903, Cedric made her maiden voyage on 11 February between Liverpool and New York City; and she was then the largest liner ever built. She quickly became popular, and while the company insisted that her name be pronounced “seedric”, the public called her “sed-ric”. Her entry into service allowed the company to establish a good service from Liverpool departures on Fridays, and to part ways with its thirty-year-old Britannic. Throughout her period of service before World War I, Cedric was mainly used on the route from Liverpool to New York. From 1906, however, she occasionally made cruises between New York and the Mediterranean each winter and sometimes also between January and March.

Incidents punctuated the start of the ship's career. On 15 March 1905, when a measles epidemic raged aboard, she was caught in a storm that damaged her, took her bell, shook the furniture, causing panic among passengers. In 1910, the ship also suffered a fire at the quayside, but the damage was negligible. In April 1912, on the other hand, Cedric was involved in the events following Titanic's disaster. The president of the White Star, Bruce Ismay, asked that the liner be detained in New York so that the surviving crewmembers of Titanic could return to the United Kingdom sailing on her.

== World War I ==
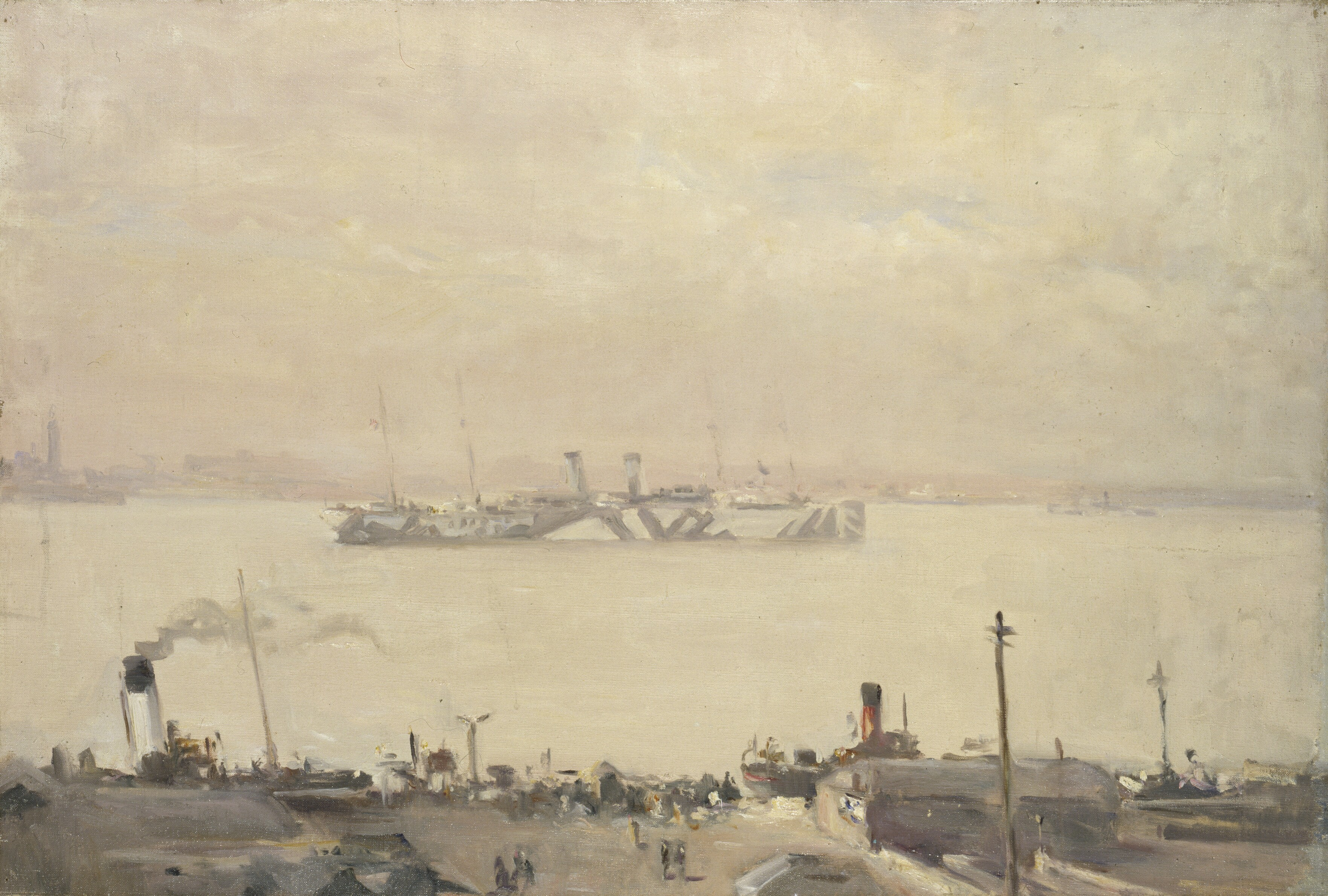
Painting of Cedric as a troopship, on the River Mersey in World War I, about 1918

At the start of the World War I, Cedric was one of the ships that were requisitioned and converted into armed merchant cruisers, along with Celtic, Teutonic and Oceanic. All were assigned to the 10th Cruiser Squadron and sent to patrol between Shetland and Norway. Cedric was assigned from November 1914 to patrol A, along with Teutonic.

Cedric's size made her a poor cruiser. In 1916, she was converted into a troop transport, a task more suited to her size. She first transported troops from Egypt and Palestine, then from the United States after their entry into the war. From 20 April 1917 to 18 March 1919, she served under the Liner Requisition Scheme and transported fuel oil for Royal Navy ships in addition to troops.

On 1 July 1917, Cedric collided with and sank the French schooner Yvonne-Odette with the latter losing 24 of her crew. On 29 January 1918, Cedric collided with and sank the Canadian Pacific ship Montreal off Morecambe Bay. Montreal was taken in tow, but she sank the next day 14 mi (12 nmi; 23 km) from the Mersey Bar lightvessel. On 24 July 1919, while the ship was docked in New York, a fire broke out in her No. 6 hold, prompting the intervention of city firefighters who found themselves trapped with crew members. Other teams of police and firefighters were needed to save the victims and bring the blaze under control, while the damage was estimated at $25,000.

== Post-war career ==
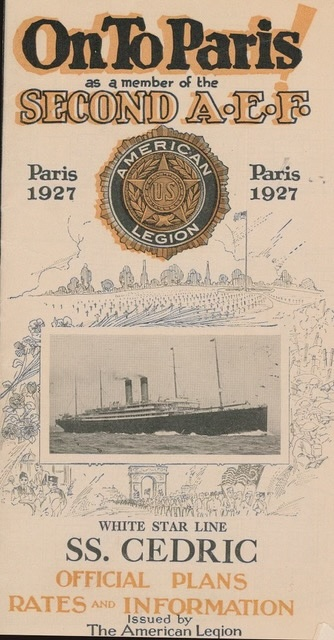
Official Plans, Rates, and Information issued by The American Legion in 1927.

Cedric was returned to her owner in September 1919 and refitted by Harland & Wolff. She was refitted to accommodate 347 first-, 250 second- and 1000 third-class passengers. Immigration laws in the United States no longer allowed as many third-class passengers to be carried as they did at the turn of the century in a cost-effective manner. From 1919 to 1922, Cedric served from Southampton, pending the arrival of the new main ships of the fleet, Homeric and Majestic. She then resumed her service from Liverpool.

On 30 September 1923, Cedric collided with Cunard Line's RMS Scythia in Queenstown harbour in dense fog. Neither vessel was seriously damaged, but Scythia needed to return to Liverpool to be repaired. On 26 December 1924, she was again the victim of a fire affecting a large shipment of Peruvian cotton aboard; the ship was not damaged, but the cargo was lost. Finally, while she was in Boston harbor on 12 September 1926, she struck and severely damaged the river vessel Van.

She continued her regular service between Liverpool and New York in the 1920s. In 1928, with new ships entering service, her age began to show and her first class became a "cabin class". Finally, the arrival in 1930 of MV Britannic and that of MV Georgic, scheduled for 1932, sealed her fate. Her last Liverpool–New York voyage commenced on 5 September 1931 and she was sold later the same year, for £22,150 to Thos. W. Ward and scrapped at Inverkeithing in 1932.

== Notable passengers ==
The leader of the Baháʼí Faith, `Abdu'l-Bahá, travelled aboard Cedric from Alexandria, Egypt, leaving on 25 March 1912, travelling via Naples, Italy on 28 March and arriving in New York City on 11 April 1912. On 5 December 1912 he travelled on Celtic from New York to Liverpool. Shoghi Effendi, as a 15-year-old youth, accompanied ‘Abdu’l-Bahá from Egypt, disembarking in Italy.

Titanic survivor Robert Williams Daniel, a banker who frequently travelled to England on business, returned to New York from Liverpool aboard Cedric, arriving on 4 December 1912 to learn of the death that day of his friend and fellow Titanic survivor Archibald Gracie IV, whom he was to visit while in New York.

Future garment industry trade union leader Sidney Hillman sailed to the United States (his name was spelled Sydney Hilman on the passengers manifest) as a steerage passenger on Cedric from Liverpool in August 1907.

Irish author Joseph Murphy emigrated to the United States aboard Cedric in 1922.

Author John Dos Passos mentions Cedric in his book “One Man’s Initiation”, when he travels from New York to Europe with the Medical Corps.
