= RMS Celtic =

Early 20th century transatlantic liner

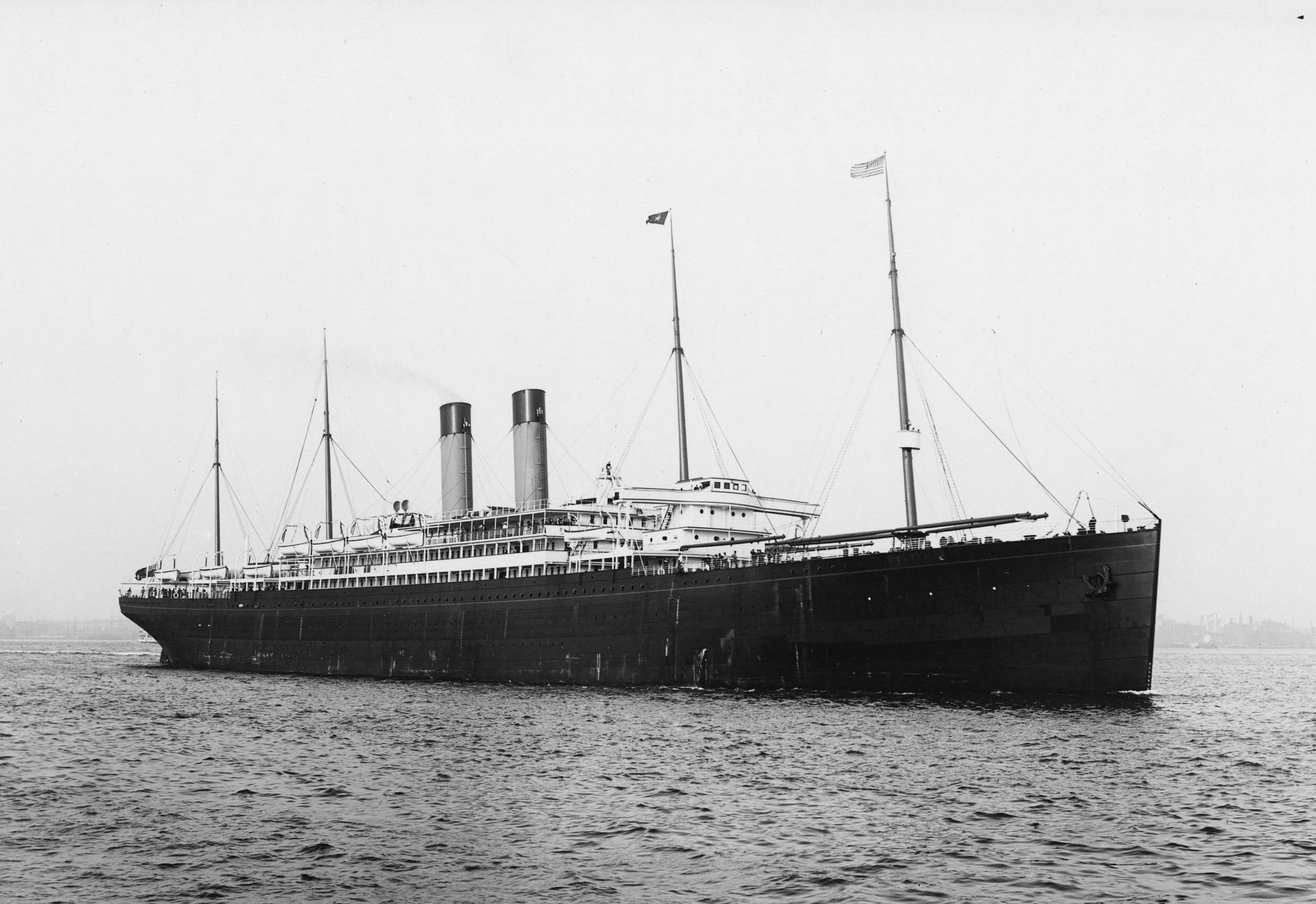
- RMS Celtic in 1905

History

United Kingdom
- Name: RMS Celtic
- Namesake: Celtic Sea
- Owner: White Star Line
- Port of registry: Liverpool
- Route: Liverpool - New York City
- Builder: Harland and Wolff, Belfast
- Yard number: 335
- Laid down: 22 March 1899
- Launched: 4 April 1901
- Completed: 11 July 1901
- Maiden voyage: 25 July 1901
- Identification: Number: 113476 Code Signal: SMBF
- Fate: Grounded on rocks off Cobh, Ireland on 10 December 1928, scrapped on site.

General characteristics
- Class & type: Big-Four class
- Tonnage: 20,904 GRT, 13,449 NRT
- Length: 701 ft (214 m)
- Beam: 75 ft (23 m)
- Installed power: 14,000 ihp (10,000 kW)
- Propulsion: 2 × quadruple-expansion steam engines; 2 × propellers
- Speed: 16 kn (18 mph; 30 km/h)
- Capacity: As built: 2,859 passengers (347 first, 160 second, 2,352 third); 1927: 1,600 passenger (350 1st class, 250 2nd class, 1,000 3rd class)
- Crew: 335

RMS Celtic was an ocean liner owned by the White Star Line. The first ship larger than SS Great Eastern by gross register tonnage (it was also 9 ft [2.7 m] longer), Celtic was the first of a quartet of ships over 20,000 tons, the dubbed The Big Four. She was the last ship ordered by Thomas Henry Ismay before his death in 1899. The second liner of her name (the first was completed in 1872), she was put into service in 1901. Her large size (she could carry nearly 3,000 passengers) and her low but economical speed (16 kn or 30 km/h, while her contemporary liners then sailed on average at 19–20 kn or 35–37 km/h) inaugurated a new company policy aiming to favour size, luxury and comfort, to the detriment of speed.

Assigned to the route between Liverpool and New York, Celtic experimented with a mode of slower than usual rotations, but was also used for a long cruise in 1902 which met with some success. In 1907, she was briefly used for the American Line on the Southampton route, before White Star set up its own fast service on this route. From Liverpool, the Big Four-class ships provided a slow but more economical service, both for the company and for the passengers. When World War I broke out, Celtic was first converted to an auxiliary cruiser. The Admiralty quickly concluded, however, that such a ship was not ideal for these functions, and transformed her into a troop transport. She struck a mine in February 1917, then was torpedoed in March 1918, but she was successfully repaired both times.

From 1920, and after having undergone a refit reducing her passenger capacity, she resumed her transatlantic service, which was only disturbed by a few collisions. However, this commercial career ceased on 10 December 1928, when, in stormy seas as she approached Cobh, Celtic grounded on the rocks. All the passengers were rescued, but the company considered it futile to attempt to salvage the liner so Celtic was scrapped on the spot. The shipbreaking operation lasted until 1933.

== Conception and construction ==
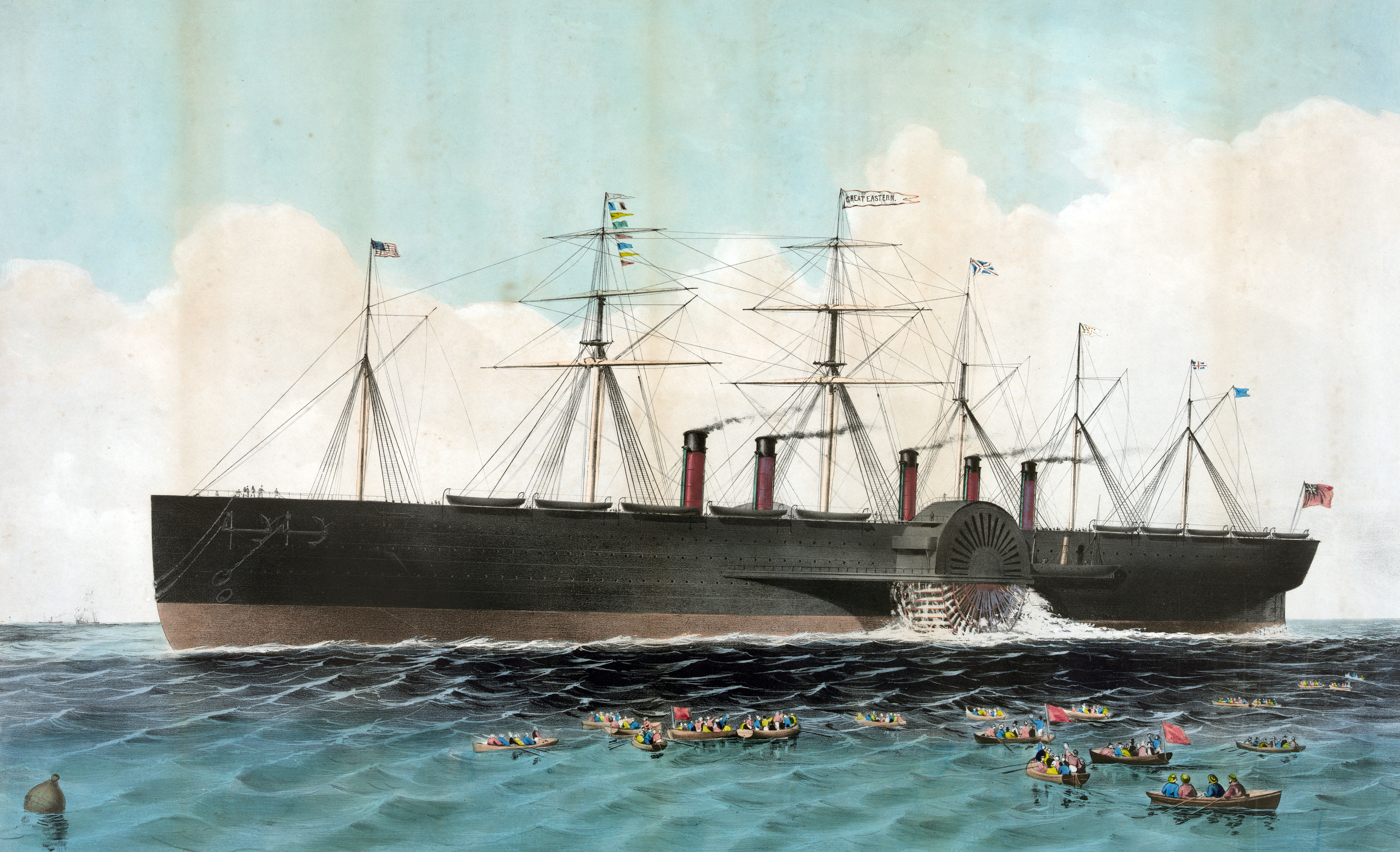
Celtic was the first ship to exceed the tonnage of Great Eastern (pictured) of 1860.

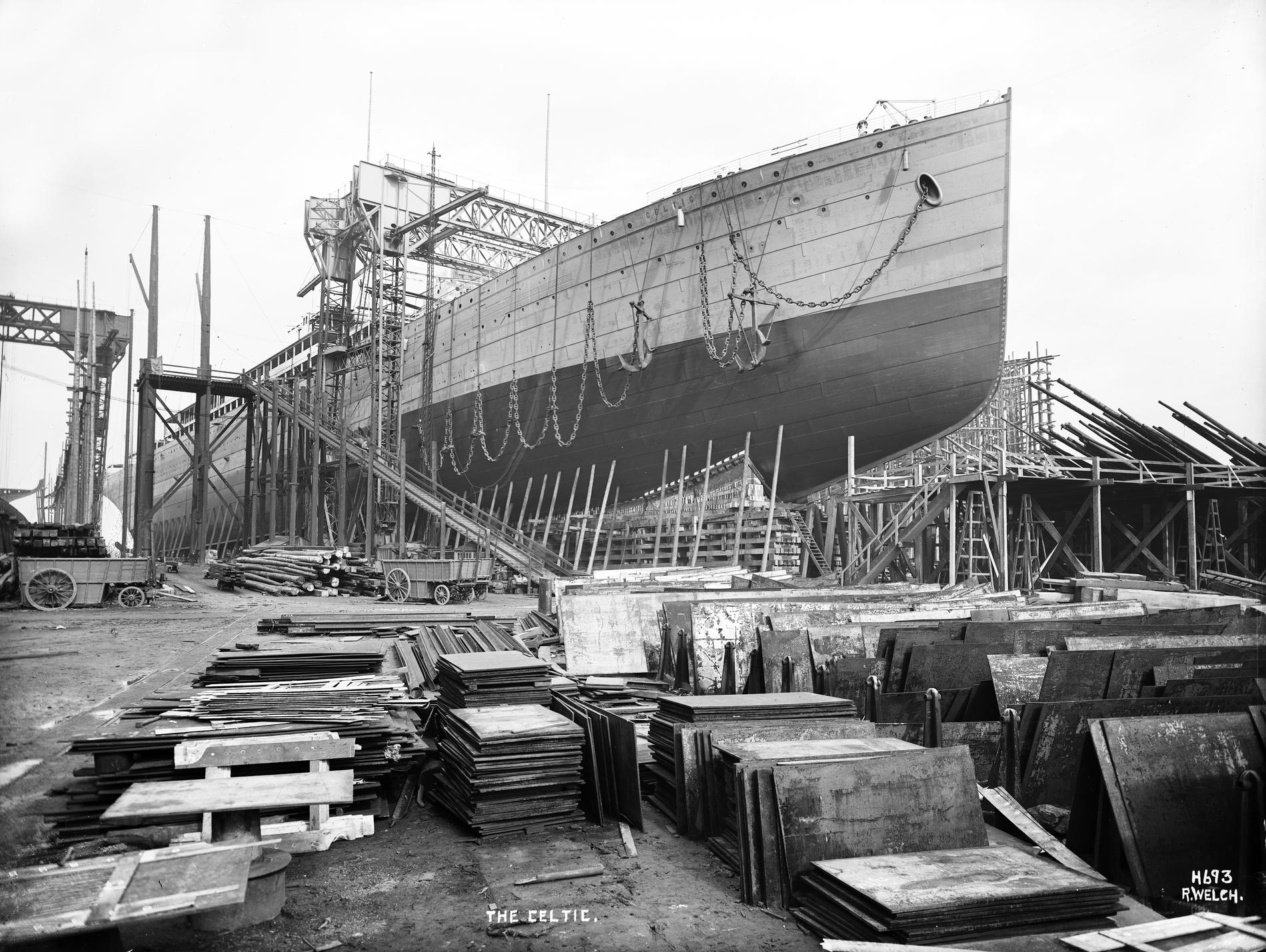
Celtic under construction

Celtic's conception, as the other Big Four-class ships, came about in 1898 to exploit a perceived opportunity to introduce a series of liners prioritising comfort rather than speed. This was accomplished in comparing the net tonnage (a measure of a ship's total enclosed space) between their two newest North Atlantic Liners; SS Cymric, which had entered service in February 1898, and RMS Oceanic, which was nearing completion at Belfast. Cymric had initially been designed as a combination passenger and livestock carrier and was designed with smaller engines capable of running the ship at more modest economical speeds. When this combination proved unpopular to travellers, Cymric was reconfigured as a full passenger vessel. The result of this was that, although she was considerably smaller than the new Oceanic, her smaller engines and fewer boilers installation allowed more space for passenger accommodations. In September 1898 contracts were made for Celtic, and the keel was laid at Harland and Wolff on 22 March 1899.

Celtic was the last liner ordered during Thomas Henry Ismay's lifetime. Upon Ismay's death, all the efforts of the Harland & Wolff yards in Belfast were turned towards Celtic. The liner met all new objectives: with it, the company definitively abandoned the race for speed and never again sought to win the Blue Riband, favouring comfort and economy. Although this change was inaugurated by Celtic, it was already tested on a smaller scale a few years earlier on Cymric. The success of the formula was enough for White Star to draw its new guideline, which remained in place until its demise three decades later.

Celtic was designed to operate at an average speed of 16 knots, which White Star ships had already achieved almost thirty years earlier. The liner, with its gross tonnage of 20,904, was the first to exceed Great Eastern's tonnage, as well as the first ship in history to exceed 20,000 gross tons.

She was the second and last White Star ship to bear the name Celtic; an earlier liner of that name had served the company starting in 1872.

== Characteristics ==
Celtic was the first ship to exceed the tonnage record set in 1860 by SS Great Eastern. With a gross tonnage of 20,904 and a net tonnage of 13,449, she was the largest liner in service at the time, although she was quickly overtaken by her larger sister ships. She measured 701 feet (213.8 m) long by 75 feet (22.9 m) wide, which made her 5 feet shorter than Oceanic, which retained its record of length until 1904, but also 7 feet wider. Powered by triple expansion machines and propelled by two propellers, Celtic sailed on average at 16 knots. The ship's silhouette was similar to that of Oceanic, with a black hull, white superstructure and two ocher-brown and black funnels. The ship was also provided with four masts which were not intended to receive sails, but served as support for the cables of the wireless telegraphy and the lookout's nest.

Although slightly smaller, Celtic offered a luxuries equivalent to her sister ships (although Adriatic benefited from new facilities such as a swimming pool). The ship had spacious cabins, supplied with electricity, as well as a big dining room topped by a glass roof, and a smoking room with stained glass windows. Passengers also had access to a library, promenade deck, lounge and veranda cafe.

The liner was originally distinguished by her very large capacity, being able to carry 347 first-class passengers, 160 second-class and 2350 third-class. On one occasion, in September 1904, she carried on board 2,971 passengers, the largest number of people ever embarked in peacetime on a ship of the White Star Line. In 1920, however, her capacity was significantly reduced, offering places for 350 first-class, 250 second-class and, 1000 third-class passengers. Finally, from 1927, she was converted into a cabin class ship, at more advantageous rates, and could carry 2,500 passengers.

== Early career ==
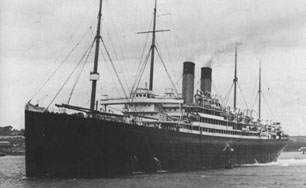
Celtic in 1903

Celtic made her maiden voyage on 25 July 1901 between Liverpool and New York. Her size was such that her loading time in each port was one week, in order to allow the embarkation of coal, goods, and passengers. This combined with her average speed of 16 knots confirmed the exit from the race for speed in which the Cunard Line and Norddeutscher Lloyd were still engaged. In February 1902, the liner was sent to the Mediterranean Sea for a five-week cruise, with 800 passengers on board, which allowed the White Star Line to experiment with this means to make its ships profitable during the off-season. Two new ships joined her in 1903 and 1904, Cedric and Baltic. During those years, Celtic's career was disturbed by a few incidents. A collision occurred on the River Mersey with the steamer Heathmore on 15 April 1903. The liner came out of the incident with a hole in her hull, which was quickly repaired. A few months later, she was affected by a minor fire which destroyed a cargo of cotton in her hold. The ship was in mid-Atlantic when it was discovered that bales of cotton in one of her holds was alight. Steps were quickly taken to prevent the flames from spreading, and the hold was tightly closed to exclude all air, while steam was admitted to drown the flames which were eating their way through the flammable cotton. The crew were set to work strengthening bulkheads but luckily the fire was kept under control, and Celtic arrived at Liverpool where the fire was speedily extinguished by shore appliances. Remarkably, none of the passengers knew until afterwards that it had occurred, for the captain and his officers went about among the passengers as if nothing unusual had taken place. On 25 December 1905, she encountered a rogue wave that hit the ship and caused damage to the second class facilities, in particular, glass panels in the smoking room, taking with it a door, and frightening the passengers.

Despite these incidents, Celtic was a resounding success. In September 1904, she set a record by carrying a total of 2,957 passengers (more than her normal maximum capacity) from Liverpool and Queenstown to New York, which was the absolute record of passengers carried by a liner of the White Star Line throughout the history of the company.

In addition to the other Big Four-class liners, her success inspired the construction, again by Harland & Wolff, of Amerika, for the German company HAPAG, which copied her profile and her characteristics, while being slightly faster and above all more luxurious.

In April and May 1907, while the White Star Line had been part of the International Mercantile Marine Co. for several years, Celtic was used for two round trip voyages by another company within the trust, the American Line, which used it to fill in for St. Paul on the Southampton to New York route. During this period, however, the liner kept the colours of its original company. During the following summer, it was the White Star's turn to open its own service from Southampton, with its express ships, Majestic, Teutonic and Oceanic, which were quickly joined by the last Big Fourliner, Adriatic.

== World War I ==
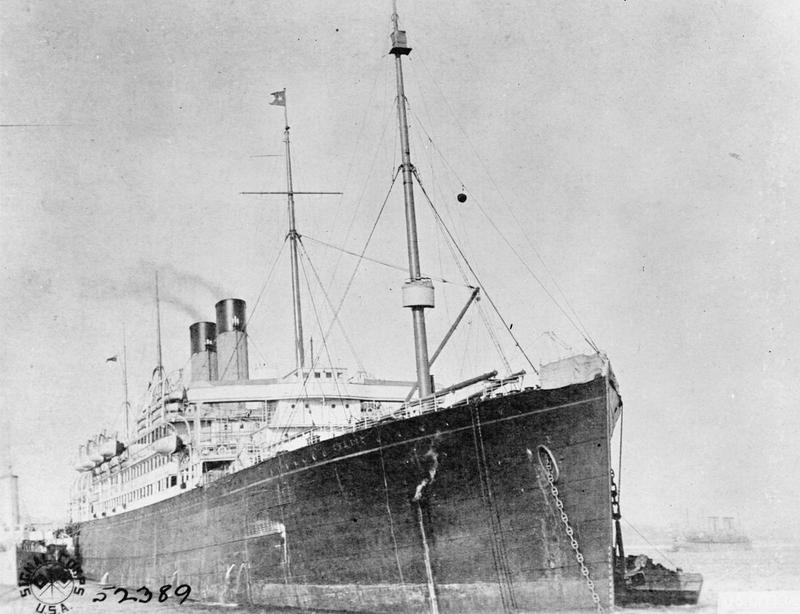
Celtic in 1919

At the start of World War I, Celtic was one of four White Star Line ships that were converted to auxiliary cruisers, along with Cedric, Oceanic and Teutonic. Intended for patrol missions in the North Sea, she was armed with cannons and joined the 10th Cruiser Squadron. Celtic was commissioned on 20 October 1914. She carried out her first patrol mission on 4 December 1914, under the command of a captain of the Royal Navy assisted by its former civilian commander, Captain Hambleton. However, the British Admiralty quickly became aware of the uselessness of such ships, too large to ideally fulfill the missions entrusted to them. In January 1916, Celtic was therefore withdrawn from service.

However, she did not remain inactive. Immediately after the end of her service as a cruiser, she was transformed into a troop transport, a mission favored by her large size which enabled her to embark a large number of soldiers and good quantities of equipment. Her first crossings, at the beginning of 1916, took her between Liverpool and Egypt. On 15 February 1917, Celtic struck a mine off the Isle of Man. Seventeen people on board were killed, but the ship survived. A number of passengers were rescued by the London and North Western Railway ship Slieve Bawn. Celtic was towed to Peel Bay and repaired in Belfast.

It was during these repairs that the ship was requisitioned as part of the Liner Requisition Scheme on 17 April 1917. She was assigned to missions to transport equipment from the United States. Her main task was to carry oil in her cargo hold, with her capable of carrying 700 tonnes per trip to Liverpool, where it was transferred to supply Navy ships. On 31 March 1918, U-Boat UB-77 torpedoed Celtic in the Irish Sea, hitting her twice. Six people on board were killed, but again, Celtic remained afloat. Eventually, the damaged vessel was towed to Liverpool and repaired again. On 17 May 1919, the British government finally returned her to her owner, who sent her to Harland & Wolff shipyards to refit her for her return to the New York route.

== Post-war and final demise ==
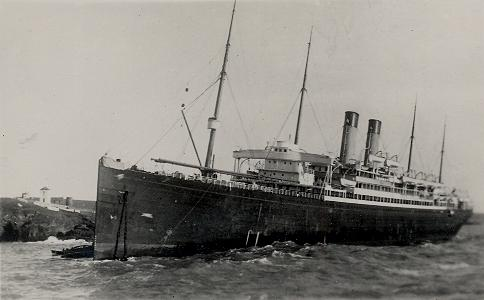
Celtic stranded on rocks near Cobh

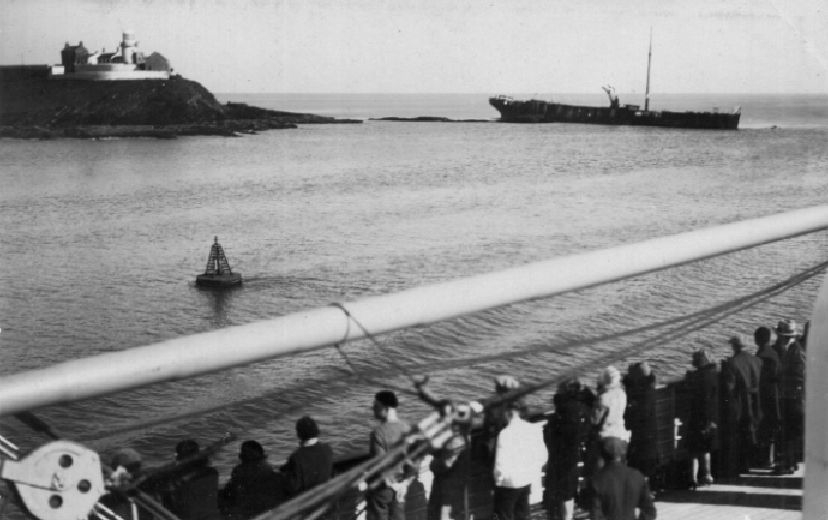
Wreck of Celtic being scrapped, 1932

In 1920, after work to restore her original decor was finished, Celtic resumed the Liverpool-New York route. To adapt her to new types of clientele and to the drop in the number of migrants on the North Atlantic, her capacity has been greatly reduced to 350 first class, 250 second class, and 1000 third class passengers. She subsequently experienced several incidents. The first incident occurred in on 25 April 1925 while in the Mersey, when she accidentally rammed the Coast Line's ship Hampshire Coast. Both vessels suffered only minor damage. The same year Celtic lost a propeller in Boston Harbor and had to return to the dock, forcing her passengers to leave by train for New York in order to take another ship.

The second collision took place on 29 January 1927, when Celtic was rammed in thick fog by the American Diamond Lines Anaconda off Fire Island. That same year, as newer ships entered service on the North Atlantic, the White Star Line refitted Celtic to carry 2,500 passengers, while her first class was converted to cabin class at cheaper rates, to keep up with account of her low speed.

Her career ended prematurely in December 1928. On December 1, the liner left New York for Cobh, via Boston, with 300 passengers on board, 350 members of the crew, and a large cargo. The voyage proceeded without incident and in good weather under the command of captain Gilbert Berry, until the night of the 9th to the 10th. As she approached Cobh, the weather became rough and it became impossible to embark the coastal pilot. Berry therefore decided to cancel the stopover and leave directly for Liverpool. Some time later, the weather seemed to improve, and the captain changed his mind and returned to Cobh to try to disembark the passengers and bags of mail that were to stop there. This required stopping the ship offshore while waiting for the pilot to return. When his barge approached the ship, the weather became agitated again, and it was impossible to board. At 4:55 am, a stronger wave accompanied by a strong gust of wind precipitated Celtic on the rocks of Roche's Point early on 10 December 1928, and she became stranded on the Cow and Calf rocks. The Ballycotton Lifeboat T.P.Hearne 2, along with tugs, a destroyer and local life-saving teams, arrived. Tenders from Cobh disembarked the passengers. Among the passengers were 25 survivors of the recently sunk SS Vestris. Seven thousand tons of cargo were scattered. A salvage team from Cox and Danks was provided to attempt recovery, but several men died after a hold loaded with grain and flooded with seawater was found to have filled with toxic fumes; due to structural failures it was judged the ship could not be moved or salvaged, and was abandoned to the insurance company who declared the ship to be a total loss. Celtic was completely dismantled for scrap by 1933.
