= SS Magnetic =

British passenger tender (1891–1935)

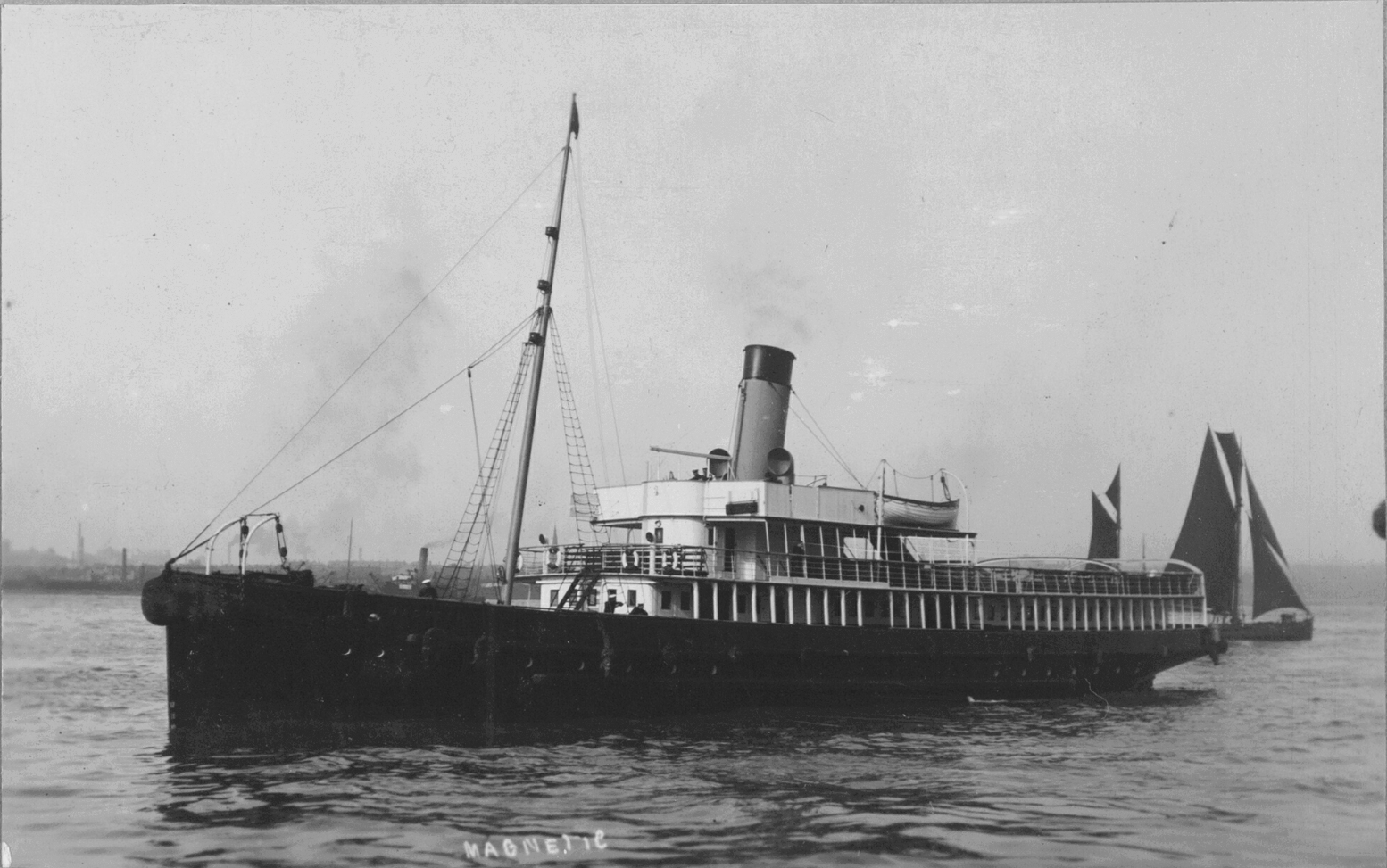
- SS Magnetic

History

United Kingdom
- Name: SS Magnetic (1891–1932); SS Ryde (1932–1935)
- Owner: White Star Line (1891–1932); Alexandra Towing Company (1932–1935)
- Port of registry: Liverpool (1891–1923)
- Builder: Harland & Wolff, Belfast
- Yard number: 269
- Launched: 28 March 1891
- In service: 6 June 1891
- Fate: Scrapped in 1935

General characteristics
- Type: Passenger tender
- Tonnage: 619 GRT
- Length: 170 feet 6 inches (51.97 m)
- Beam: 32 feet 11 inches (10.03 m)
- Height: 48 feet 6.28 inches (14.79 m)
- Draft: 7 feet 3.8 inches (2.23 m)
- Speed: 13.5 knots (25.0 km/h)

SS Magnetic was a passenger tender of the White Star Line built in 1891. She was laid down at the Harland & Wolff Shipyards in Belfast, Ireland. Magnetic was sold to a different company in 1932 and renamed Ryde, and scrapped in 1935.

== Career ==
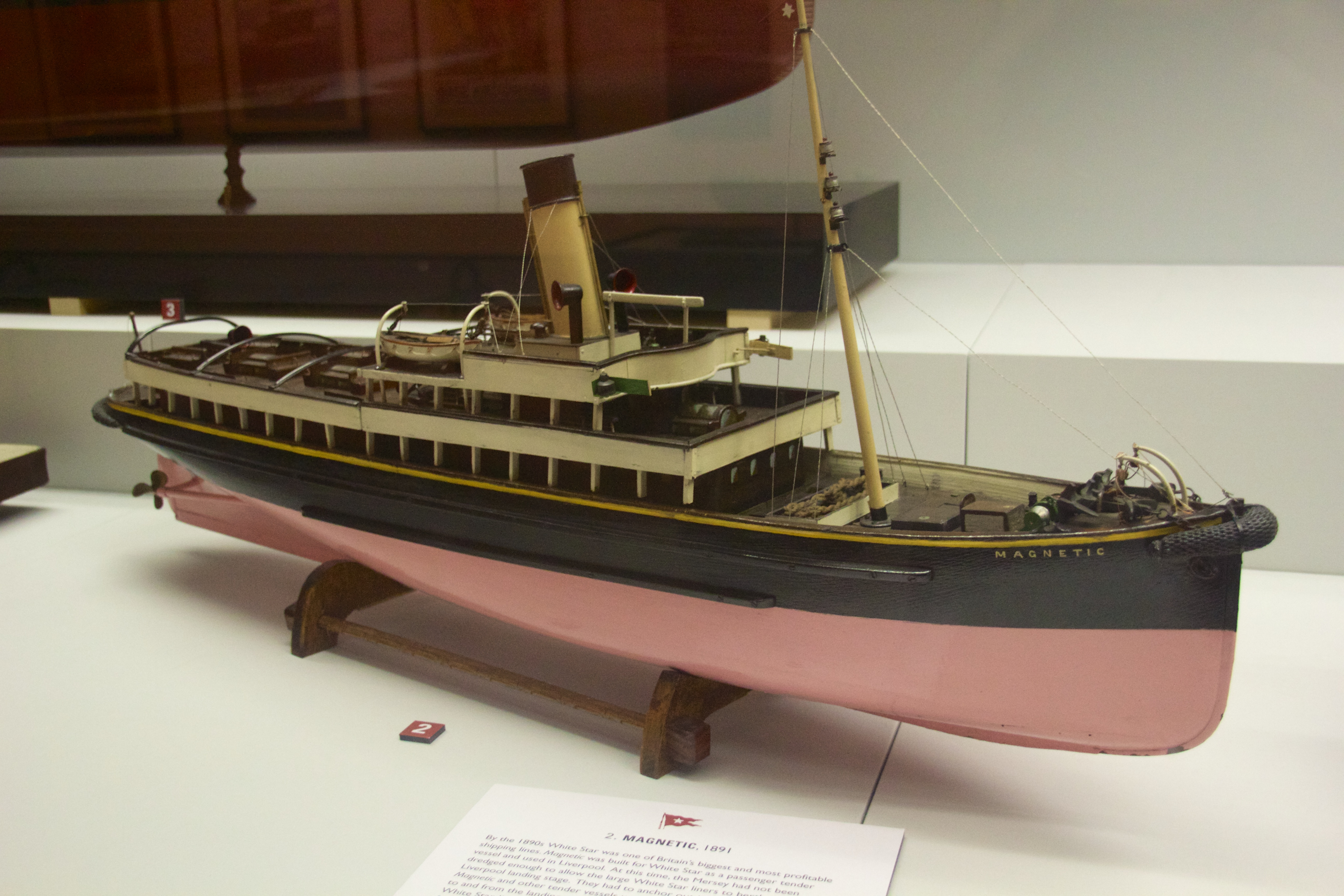
Model of Magnetic at the Merseyside Maritime Museum, Liverpool

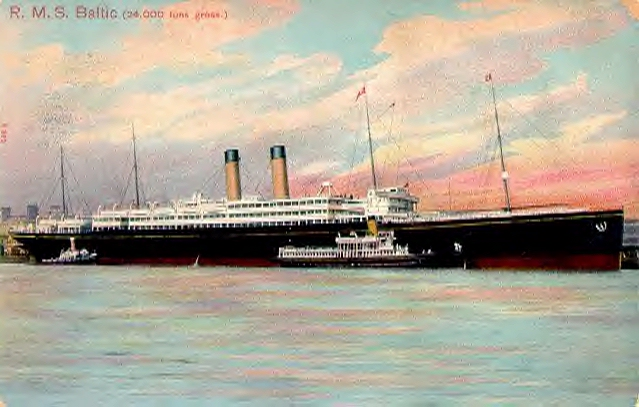
Postcard of Magnetic alongside RMS Baltic

Magnetic was built by Harland and Wolff and launched on 28 March 1891, being delivered to her new owners on 6 June 1891. She was based at the Port of Liverpool and upon her completion, used mainly to take passengers to White Star's various ocean liners. However, she was also used as a water carrier, tow boat, tug and Mersey cruise boat. She was present at the 1897 Spithead Review as tender to White Star's Teutonic.

From January 1912 until March, Magnetic was reboilered and had a general overhaul. After this work was completed, she was pictured beside RMS Olympic in a photograph including the Olympic sister ship RMS Titanic at their second and last meeting, before running sea trials for two days before returning to service in Liverpool.

From 1891 to 1932, Magnetic served with the White Star Line. On 17 February 1915, she collided with the schooner Kate in the Crosby Channel; Kate sank with the loss of three of her four crew members. On 3 October 1925 a fire broke out on board Magnetic, and she was beached and later repaired at Liverpool. She was then sold by White Star in December 1932 to the Alexandra Towing Company, of Liverpool. Now renamed Ryde, she resumed her usual duties and was present at the opening of No.2 Stanlow Oil Dock in the Manchester Ship Canal in 1933. She was based at Llandudno from 1934, and was used as an excursion steamer. She was sold to ship breakers on 20 October 1935 and was scrapped at Port Glasgow.
