= SS Lapland =

Early 20th century ocean liner

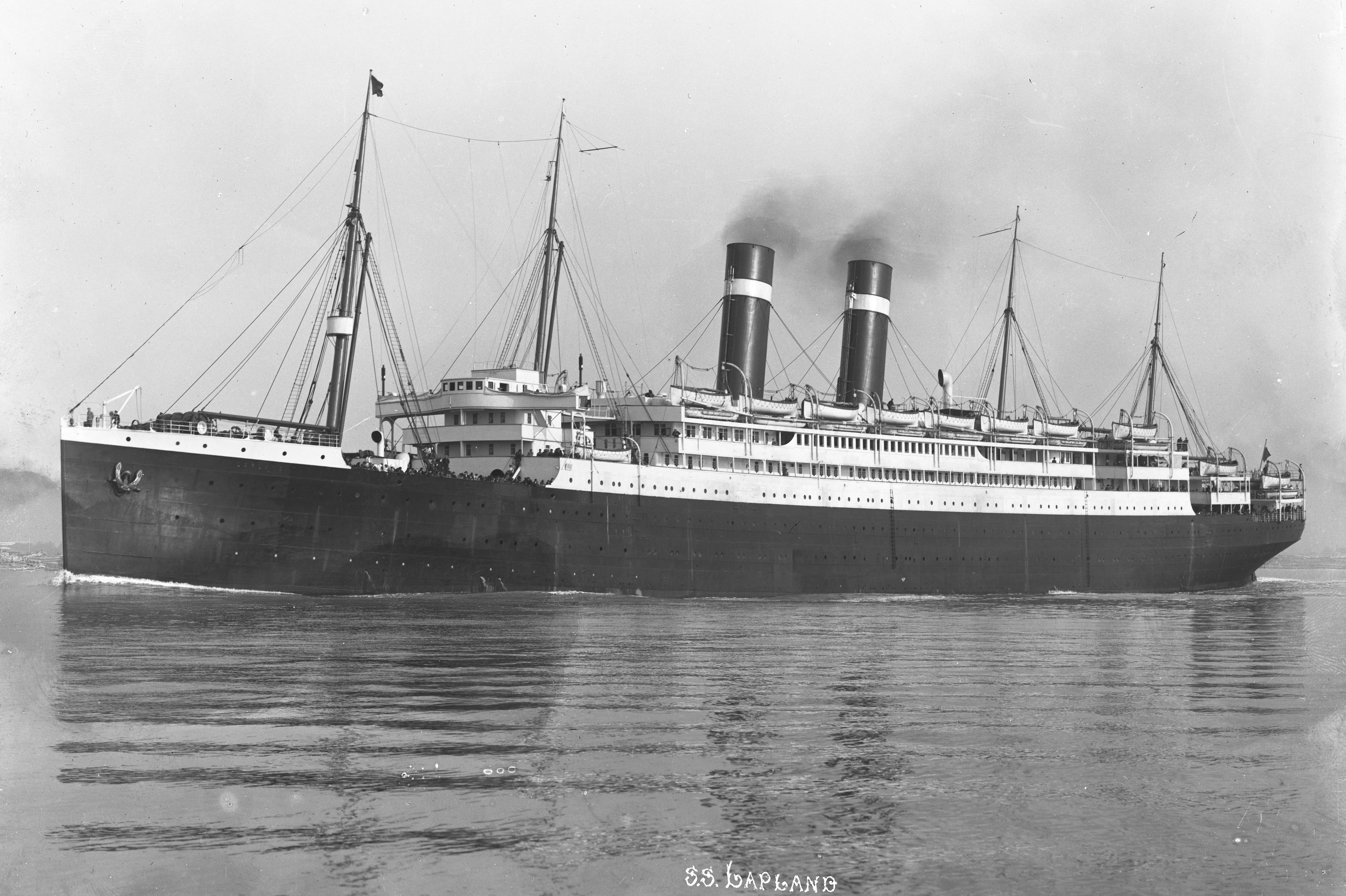
- Lapland on the river Scheldt

History
- Name: Lapland
- Namesake: Lapland
- Owner: Red Star Line (1909–1914); International Nav Co (1914–1927); Leyland Line (1927–1933)
- Operator: Red Star Line (1909–1914); International Nav Co (1914–1927); Leyland Line (1927–1933)
- Port of registry: (Belgium) Antwerp (1909–1914); (United Kingdom) Liverpool (1927–1933)
- Builder: Harland & Wolff, Belfast
- Yard number: 393
- Launched: 27 June 1908
- Completed: 27 March 1909
- Maiden voyage: 10 April 1909
- Out of service: 1933
- Identification: official number 137398 (1914–1933); code letters JGFW (until 1933)
- Fate: Scrapped at Osaka, 1934
- Notes: Hit mine, April 1917

General characteristics
- Tonnage: as built: 17,540 GRT; by 1930: 18,565 GRT, 11,697 NRT; 1931 onward: 18,866 GRT, 11,394 NRT
- Length: 605.8 ft (184.6 m)
- Beam: 70.4 ft (21.5 m)
- Depth: 37.4 ft (11.4 m)
- Installed power: 2,343 NHP
- Propulsion: 2 × quadruple-expansion engines; 2 × screw propellers
- Speed: 17 knots (31 km/h)
- Capacity: 1,500 passengers
- Sensors & processing systems: by 1930: submarine signalling; wireless direction finding

SS Lapland was a steam ocean liner built in Ireland for the Belgian Red Star Line, as Red Star's flagship, similar in appearance to the fellow liners SS Samland, SS Gothland and SS Poland, but far larger. She was a half sister to White Star Line's "Big Four." They were similar in many ways, such as the island bridge, 4 masts, 2 funnels. But Lapland had a less luxurious interior.

Her ownership passed to the International Navigation Company in 1914 and the UK Leyland Line in 1927. In the First World War she was converted into a troop ship. In 1933 she was sold to Japanese buyers who scrapped her in 1934.

== Building ==
Harland & Wolff built Lapland in Belfast, launching her on 27 June 1908 and completing her on 27 March 1909. She was 605.8 ft (184.6 m) long and had a beam of 70.4 ft (21.5 m). She had twin screw propellers, each driven by a four-cylinder quadruple-expansion engine, and her service speed was 17 knots (31 km/h).

== Red Star years ==
On 10 April 1909 Lapland began her maiden voyage from Antwerp via Dover to New York City under the Belgian flag. Lapland was one of a fleet of Red Star liners that between them provided weekly sailings on the route.

In April 1912, after the Titanic struck an iceberg and sunk on 15 April, it was arranged for the Lapland to carry the 1,927 bags of mail that Titanic had been scheduled to carry on 20 April. Most of Titanic's surviving crew also sailed with her back to England, with around twenty-four members, including all surviving officers, remaining behind to testify in the U.S. Senate inquiry.

In 1914, she made her last voyage between Antwerp and New York, was transferred to the US-owned International Navigation Company and began sailing between Liverpool and New York.

== First World War ==
On 29 October 1914 Lapland began the Liverpool – New York City crossings under the UK flag while under charter to Cunard Line. In April 1917 she struck a naval mine off the Mersey Bar Lightship, but managed to reach Liverpool. She sailed from Halifax to Liverpool on 29 September 1916 with Canadian troops of the 150th Battalion of the Canadian Expeditionary Force. In June 1917 she was requisitioned and converted into a troop ship. Among her passengers in August 1917 were aviators of the 1st Aero Squadron, the first unit of the United States Army Air Service to reach France.

== Post-war ==
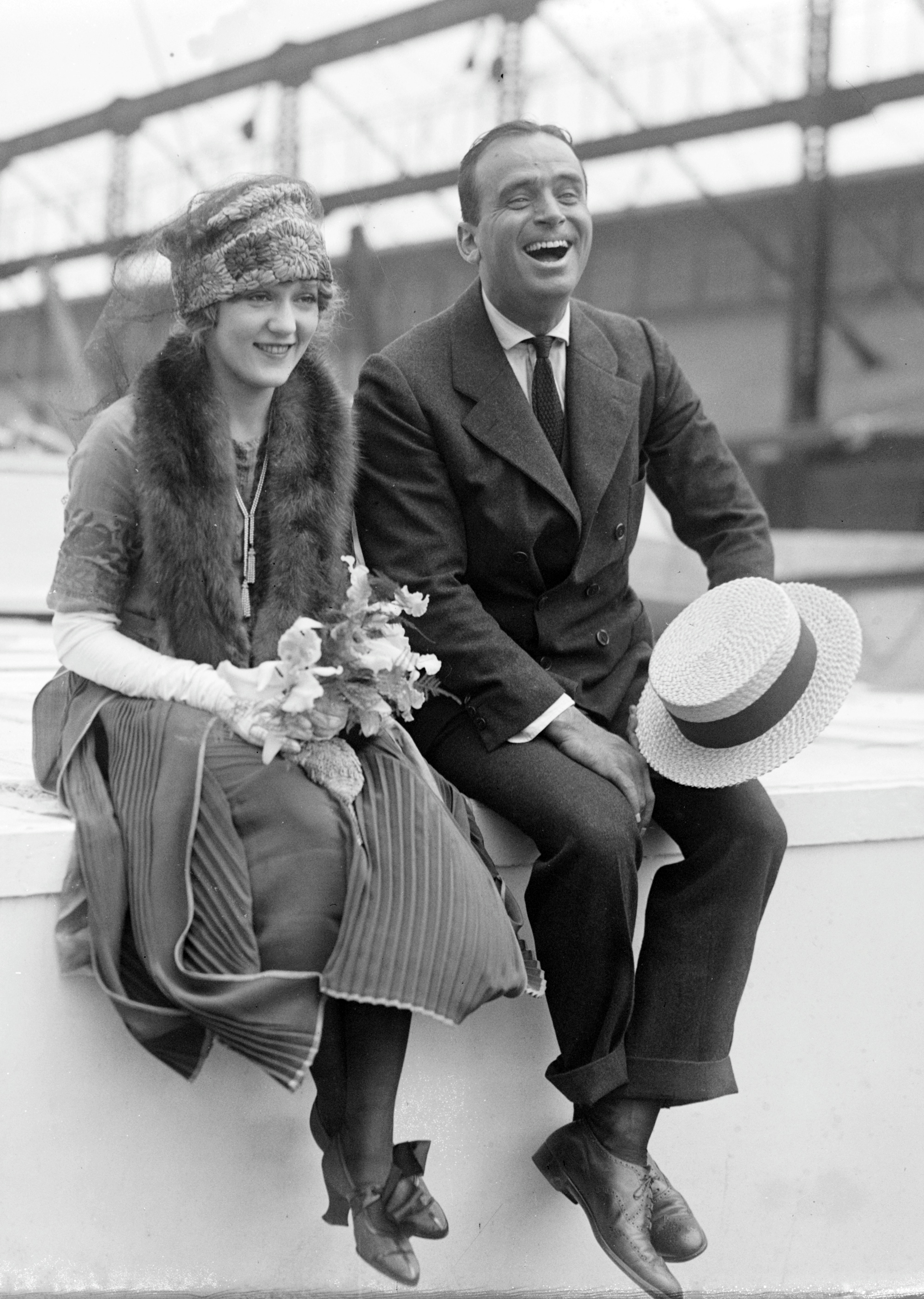
The honeymooning actors Douglas Fairbanks and Mary Pickford aboard Lapland in June 1920

On 24 November 1918 she began her first voyage after the Armistice when she sailed from Liverpool for New York for the White Star Line and on 1 August 1919 started her sixth and last round voyage on this service. On 16 September 1919 she was transferred to the Southampton – New York route under charter to White Star Line. She made three round voyages on this route, the last starting on 27 November 1919.

Lapland was refitted with passenger accommodation for 389 first, 448 second and 1,200 third class passengers and her tonnage was revised to 18,565 GRT. On 3 January 1920 she resumed service for Red Star Line but under the UK flag when she sailed from Antwerp via Southampton to New York. In 1927 she was transferred to Leyland Line and that April she was refitted to carry cabin, tourist and third class passengers. On 29 April 1932 she started her last voyage between Antwerp, Southampton, Le Havre and New York.

In 1932 and 1933 she was used on short cruises from London to the Mediterranean. Between June and September 1933 she carried 5,000 cruise passengers.

In October 1933 was sold to Japanese buyers for scrap. She was broken up in Osaka, starting on 29 January 1934.

== Bibliography ==
- Bonsor, NRP. North Atlantic Seaway. Vol. 2. Brookside Publications. p. 850. ISBN 978-0905824017.
- Harnack, Edwin P (1930) [1903]. All About Ships & Shipping (3rd ed.). London: Faber and Faber.
- Kint, Andre; Vervoort, Robert (1990). De Red Star Line, Antwerpens Vergane Glorie (in Dutch). Antwerp: Vries Brouwers. pp. 98–99. ISBN 978-9061747222.
- Wilson, RM (1956). The Big Ships. London: Cassell & Co.
- Lee, Paul (24 April 2020). Titanic: The Homecoming – Tales From The Lapland.
