= RMS Scythia =

Cunard line transatlantic ocean liner

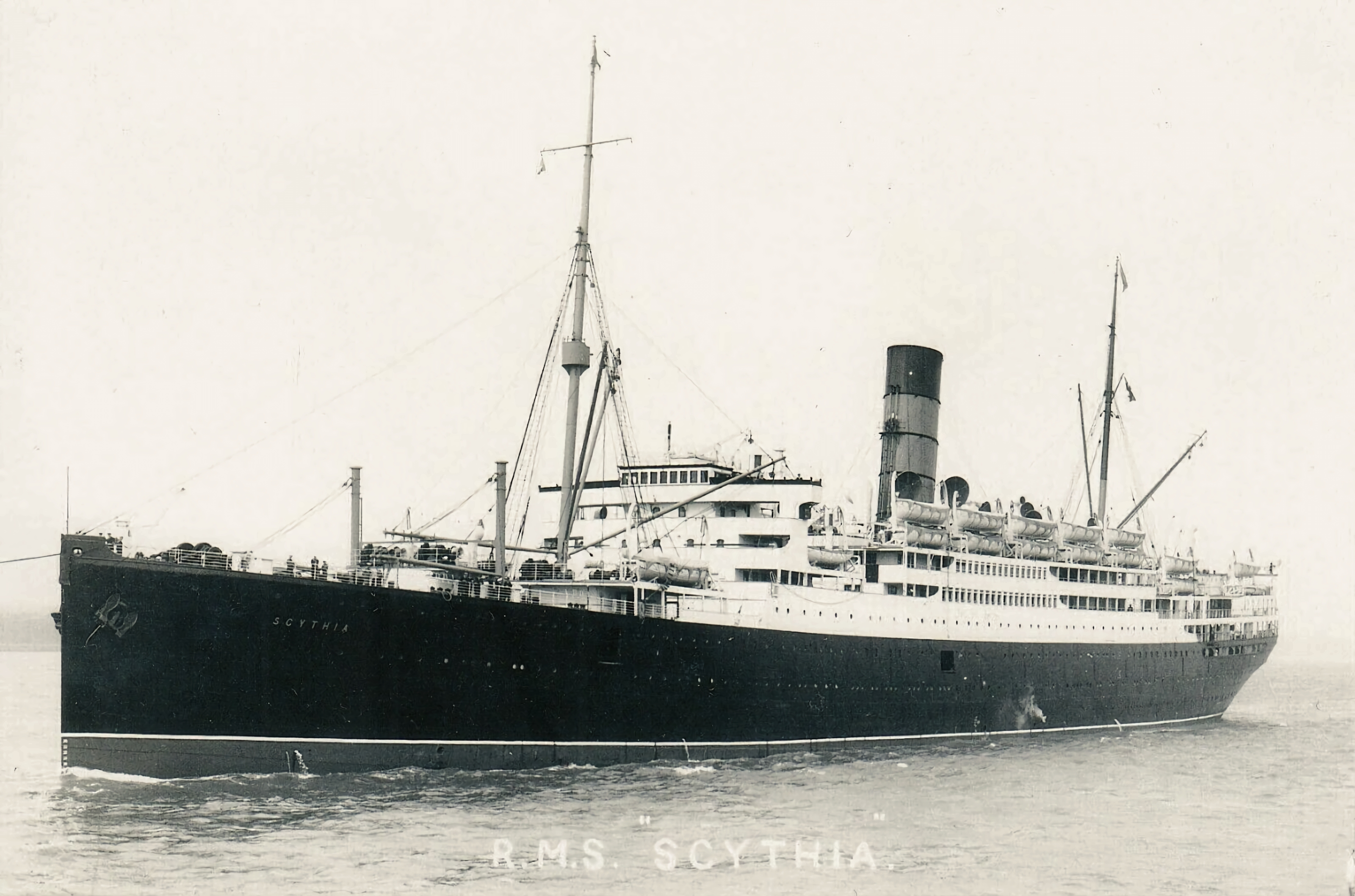
- The RMS Scythia heading into port

History

United Kingdom
- Name: RMS Scythia
- Owner: 1920–34: Cunard Line; 1934–49: Cunard-White Star Line; 1949–58: Cunard Line
- Port of registry: United Kingdom
- Route: New York – Mediterranean; London – Quebec; Liverpool – Cobh – Halifax – New York
- Ordered: 1919
- Builder: Vickers Ltd, Barrow
- Yard number: 493
- Launched: 23 March 1920
- Completed: December 1920
- Maiden voyage: 20 August 1921
- Fate: Scrapped on 23 January 1958

General characteristics
- Type: Ocean liner
- Tonnage: 19,761 GRT; 11,927 NRT
- Length: 600.7 ft (183.1 m)
- Beam: 73.8 ft (22.5 m)
- Draught: 32 ft 8 in (10.0 m)
- Depth: 40.7 ft (12.4 m)
- Installed power: 2,528 NHP
- Propulsion: steam turbines, double-reduction gears, twin propellers
- Speed: 16 kn (30 km/h)
- Capacity: Passenger berths: 2,200 total; 350 1st class; 350 2nd class; 1,500 3rd class

RMS Scythia was a Cunard ocean liner. She sailed on her maiden voyage in 1921, and became a troop and supply ship during the Second World War. Scythia was the longest serving Cunard liner until 4 September 2005, when her record was surpassed by Queen Elizabeth 2.

== History ==
After heavy losses during the First World War, Cunard Line embarked on an ambitious building programme. It decided to build "intermediate", 19,000 GRT ships rather than the large liners it had previously employed. Scythia was the first ship in this new fleet, and building began in 1919. Scythia was built for the services between Liverpool and Queenstown in the British Isles to New York and Boston, in the United States. A luxury liner designed to appeal to American tourists, in the mid-1920s, she began sailing from New York to the Mediterranean.

Scythia was requisitioned at the end of 1939, left Liverpool on 24 September 1940 with 48 children bound for Boston, sponsored by readers of the Boston Evening Transcript newspaper, part of a wider British evacuation programme under the Children's Overseas Reception Board.

She became a troop ship on 1 November 1940, and sailed from Liverpool to the Middle East carrying the 1st King's Dragoon Guards. She then saw service carrying evacuees from Liverpool to New York. In 1942, Scythia took part in the Allied invasion of French North Africa. On 23 November she was struck by an aerial torpedo. Her crew managed to get her to harbour at Algiers, and she suffered only five casualties out of a complement of 4,300 men.

Scythia was salvaged and taken to New York for repair in January 1943, and afterwards ferried American troops to Europe. At the end of the war she took many US troops back from Europe, many of them accompanied by their new brides, before sailing to India to bring home UK troops from the war in the East. She was also a war bride ship taking Canadian war brides and their children from Liverpool to Pier 21 in Halifax in the early part of 1946 and Canadian service personnel including soldiers from the 1st Canadian Army and Royal Canadian Engineers from Britain back to Halifax in March 1946. One of her last missions as a troop ship was to bring the 1st King's Dragoon Guards home to Liverpool, on 11 March 1948.

Later in 1948, Scythia was handed to the International Refugee Organization to take refugees from Europe to Canada. In 1950 she became a passenger ship again, sailing from Britain to Canada and later to New York. Again in 1957 the Scythia was used to transport Hungarian refugees to Canada (departed Southampton England 19 Jan 1957), landing in Halifax, Nova Scotia at Pier 21 (Canada's equivalent to Ellis Island in New York).

Her final route was around the North Sea. In 1958, after 37 years of service, Scythia was delivered to ship breakers Thos. W. Ward at Inverkeithing by her final Master, Geoffrey Thrippleton Marr.
