= Hugh McElroy =

Chief Purser of RMS Titanic

- Studio photo of McElroy, c. 1909
- Born: 28 October 1874; Liverpool, Lancashire, United Kingdom
- Died: 15 April 1912 (aged 37); North Atlantic Ocean
- Occupation: Merchant seaman
- Known for: Chief Purser of RMS Titanic
- Spouse: Barbara Mary Ennis (m. 1910)
- Relatives: Clint McElroy (great-nephew)
- Awards: Transport Medal

Hugh Richard Walter McElroy (28 October 1874 – 15 April 1912) was a British Merchant sailor who served aboard the RMS Titanic as Chief Purser during its ill-fated maiden voyage. He was the head of the ship's victualling department.

McElroy perished in the sinking, along with Assistant Purser Reginald Barker. His body was the most senior crew member to be recovered and identified by the CS Mackay-Bennett. He was subsequently buried at sea.

== Early life ==
McElroy was born in Liverpool to Richard McElroy (1844–1888), a shipwright born to Irish parents, and a Scottish mother from Edinburgh, Jessie Fox (1847–1927). He was one of four children, born after his sisters Charlotte and Jessie, and before his brother Richard. He was baptised in the Catholic faith and, at age 16 in 1890, left to train as a priest in St. Mary's Priory in Bodmin, Cornwall.

However, McElroy dropped out of priest training in 1892 and returned to his home in Liverpool, where he followed his father's footsteps by joining the British Merchant Navy.

== Career ==
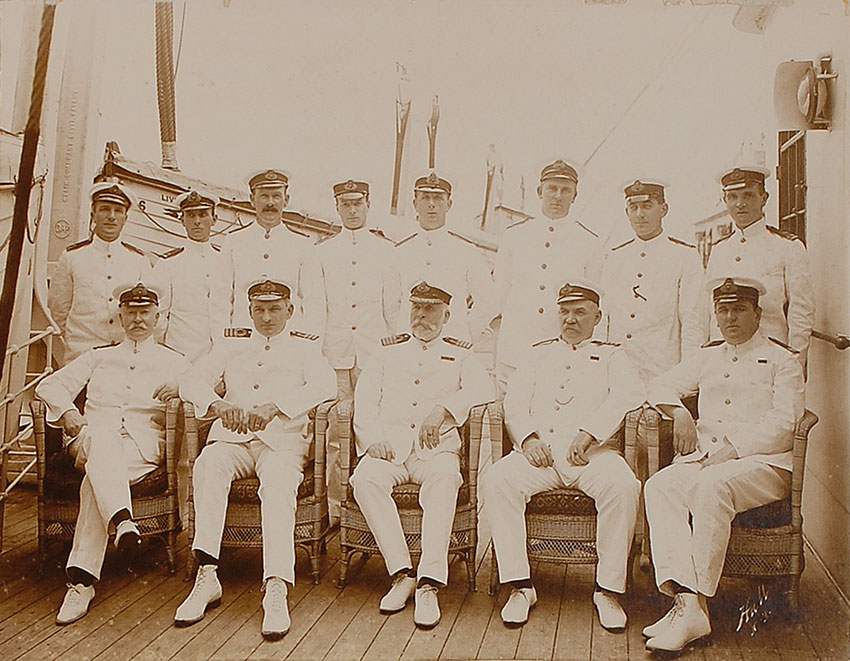
Crew members of the RMS Olympic with Captain Edward Smith (seated centre). McElroy is seated on the far right. Also photographed are Chief Officer Henry Wilde (seated second from left) and First Officer William Murdoch (standing far right)

=== Allan Line ===
McElroy joined the Allan Line in 1893 and served as purser for seven years aboard ships such as the SS Parisian and SS Sardinian. As Chief Purser, he was in charge of the victualling crew, which often made up the biggest department on a passenger liner. According to his White Star Line documents, he served on 12 voyages with the Allan Line in total.

=== White Star Line ===
In 1899, McElroy joined the White Star Line, where he remained for the rest of his career. His first ship with the line was the SS Cymric. During the Second Boer War, McElroy served aboard the troopship HMT Britannic under Captain Bertram Fox Hayes; he is mentioned in the Boer War Transport Medal Roll book and was awarded the Transport Medal with the South Africa Clasp.

McElroy went on to serve aboard notable ships such as the RMS Cedric, RMS Adriatic, SS Laurentic, RMS Majestic, RMS Baltic, and RMS Republic. On the Baltic and Adriatic, he served under Captain Edward Smith, the White Star Line's distinguished captain, and was aboard for its maiden voyage. In 1911, he was aboard the RMS Olympic, with Smith and William Murdoch, for its maiden voyage and also when it collided with HMS Hawke at the start of its fifth voyage.

Aboard the Cymric, in 1900, a fire broke which burned for 30 hours. On the orders of Captain Lindsay of the Cymric, McElroy was put in charge of the passengers and their welfare while the remainder of the crew fought the fire. McElroy and the rest of the crew were praised their "coolness and bravery" by the passengers after the fire was brought under control.

In June 1910, while McElroy was serving on Adriatic, African-American activist Fannie R. Givens and four others accompanying her had been given a "bad table" away from the other passengers. Upon complaining to McElroy about their set up, Givens stated they were given an "insulting" response, that he would not let them sit with white passengers. She subsequently went on a hunger strike before Captain Smith called upon her, resolving the issue by ordering that her request be met. Subsequently, the group were given the "best table" for the remainder of the voyage.

By the time he was assigned to Titanic, McElroy was considered the White Star Line's senior Purser. Historian Geoffrey Marcus noted that he was a strong sense of humour and could hold his own against even the most difficult passengers. He was popular amongst several regular first class passengers and many would book their voyages so as to sail with him aboard.

== Personal life ==
On 10 September 1910, McElroy married Barbara Ennis, an Irishwoman. They had no children. After his death, she remarried John Clancy in 1914 and moved to Ireland, where she remained for the rest of her life. She died in Springmount, County Wexford, on 18 December 1953.

== RMS Titanic ==
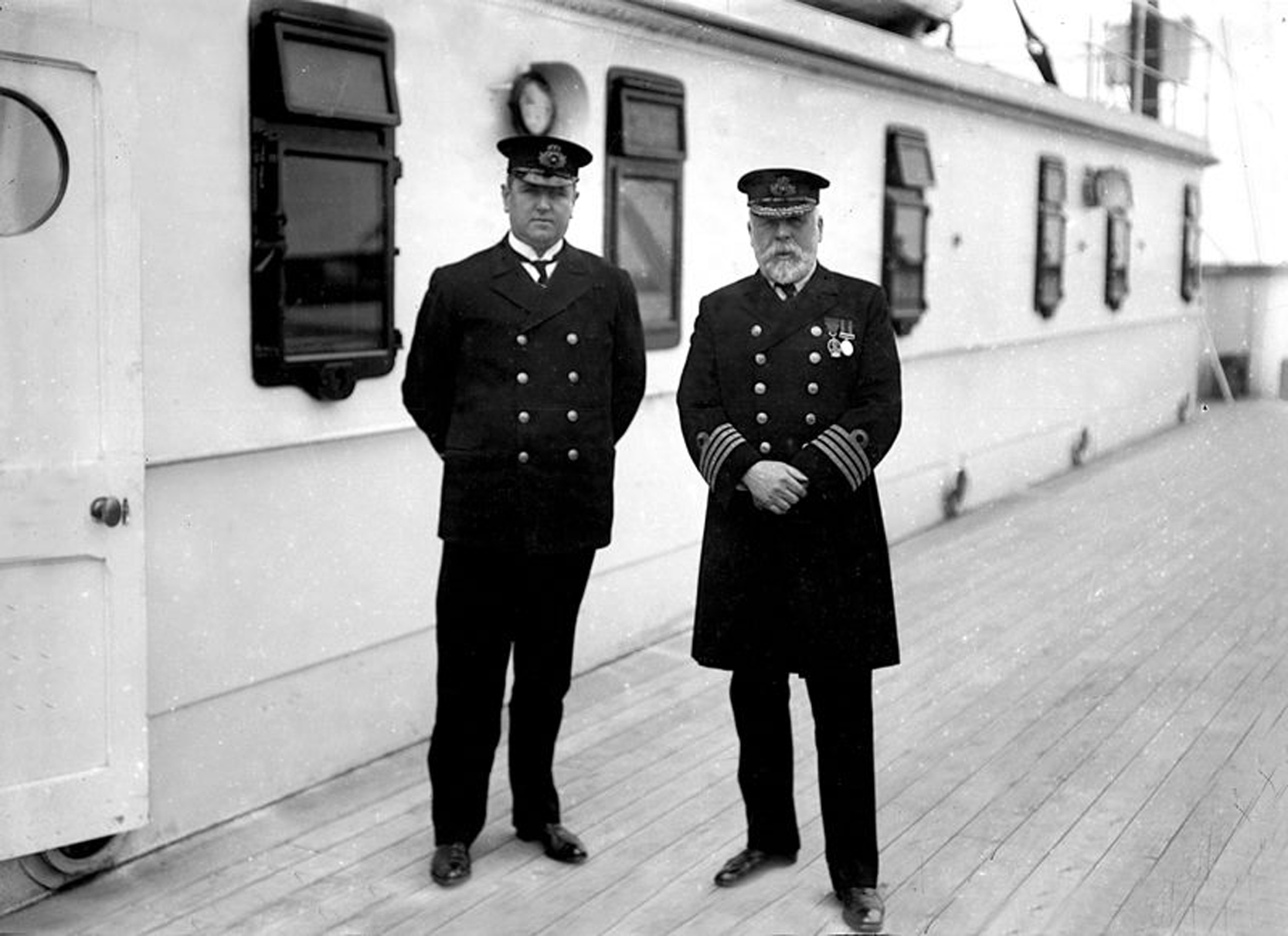
Purser McElroy (left) with Captain Smith on 11 April 1912, aboard Titanic. It is one of the last photos taken of either man.

As Chief Purser, McElroy's role was considered of equal importance as that of Captain Edward Smith. He was stationed on C Deck, at the First Class Purser's office near the Grand staircase. As part of his duties, he had to ensure that all passengers had valid tickets, was in charge of all purchases for a trip, paid the wages to the crew, and sent passenger messages to the Marconi wireless room on the Boat Deck via a pneumatic tube.

Apart from Captain Smith, he was one of the few crew members who regularly dined with the passengers as part of his duties. He was said to have been almost as popular with passengers as the captain and was highly regarded for his amiability and good sense of humour.

=== Iceberg collision and evacuation ===
On the day of the sinking, he had spent the evening in the First Class dining saloon. After the ship struck the iceberg, while the damage was still being surveyed, he initially told passengers to return to their rooms but have their lifebelts on. When the situation became dire, he handled what was described as a "crowd demanding their valuables, which the purser and his assistant were endeavouring to hand out as quickly as possible." After a while, McElroy reportedly locked the safe and urged passengers to get their lifebelts and report to the boats. First-class steward Frederick Dent Ray saw McElroy and assistant Purser Reginald Barker "at the safe taking things out and putting them in [Gladstone] bags." It was likely that the pair were saving the valuables to be distributed after a potential rescue; however, neither man would survive, and the bags were lost in the sinking. (Note: After the wreck site was discovered in 1987, a leather bag was found which contained, amongst other things, precious valuables such as pendants, rings, and pocket watches as well jewelry with diamonds, sapphires and pearls. This was likely one of the bags pursers McElroy and Barker used to secure the valuables removed from the Purser's Office.)

Many survivors reported seeing him during the evacuation on the starboard side, helping with the loading of the lifeboats. Survivor Jack Thayer claimed later that, at Collapsible C, McElroy fired a gun twice into the air to aid First Officer William Murdoch, who was ordering two men who had jumped into the boat out of it; however, only the senior deck officers were issued guns, so it is unlikely that McElroy fired a shot.

McElroy was reportedly last seen standing on the Boat Deck near the gymnasium, along with Assistant Purser Barker and the ship's two doctors, William O'Loughlin and John Simpson, supposedly joking around. None of the men survived.

=== Body recovery and burial at sea ===
Of the crew who died during the Titanic sinking, McElroy was the highest-ranking crew member whose body was recovered by the CS Mackay-Bennett. He was recognised by his uniform and the address "Miss McElroy, Layton, Spottisbury, Dorset", referring to his sister. However, his name was erroneously listed as "Herbert W. McElroy."

After his possessions were catalogued, McElroy's body was buried at sea on 22 April 1912.
