= Edward Smith (sea captain) =

British merchant navy officer (1850–1912)

Commander Edward Smith RD RNR
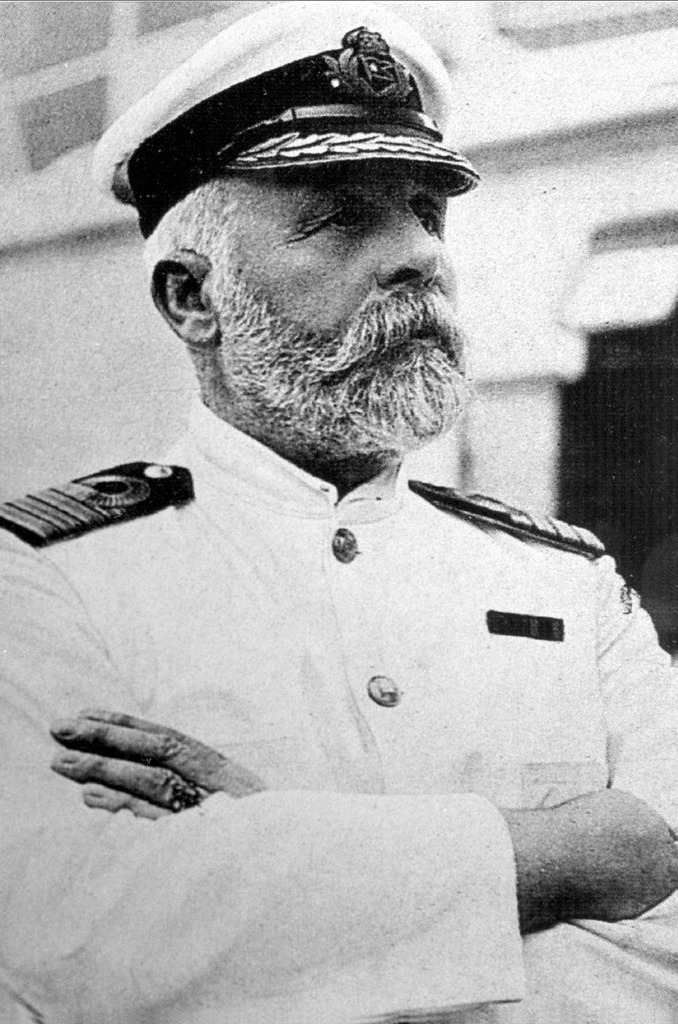
- Smith in 1911
- Born: Edward John Smith; 27 January 1850; Hanley, Staffordshire, England
- Died: 15 April 1912 (aged 62); North Atlantic Ocean
- Other names: E.J.; Ted
- Occupations: Sea captain; Naval officer
- Years active: 1867–1912
- Known for: Captain of the RMS Titanic
- Spouse: Sarah Eleanor Pennington (m. 1887)
- Children: Helen Melville Smith
- Military career
- Allegiance: United Kingdom
- Branch: Royal Naval Reserve
- Rank: Commander
- Conflicts: Second Boer War
- Awards: Transport Medal; Reserve Decoration

Commander Edward John Smith RD RNR (27 January 1850 – 15 April 1912) was a British merchant sea captain and naval officer, best known as the captain of the ill-fated ocean liner RMS Titanic.

Born in Hanley, Staffordshire, Smith joined the British Merchant Navy at age 17 as an apprentice, beginning a long and distinguished mercantile career. In 1880, he joined the White Star Line as an officer and rose quickly to become a captain in the fleet. He concurrently served in the Royal Naval Reserve, reaching the rank of "Commander" and receiving the Reserve Decoration when he was released in 1905. During the Second Boer War, Smith commanded troop transport ships carrying British Imperial troops to the Cape Colony and was awarded the Transport Medal for his services.

A popular figure in the mercantile service, Smith was known as the "Millionaire's Captain" for his social skills and hospitality. He was regarded as the White Star Line's unofficial Commodore, serving as captain on the maiden voyages of several of the company's luxury liners. In 1912, Smith became captain of Titanic and perished along with 1,495 others when the ship sank on her maiden voyage after colliding with an iceberg.

== Personal life ==
Edward John Smith was born on 27 January 1850 on Well Street in Hanley, Staffordshire, England, the son of Edward Smith, a potter, and Catherine Hancock (née Marsh). His parents had married on 2 August 1841 in Shelton, Staffordshire, and later kept a shop.

He attended the British School in Etruria, Staffordshire, until the age of 13, after which he left to operate a steam hammer at the Etruria Forge. In 1867, aged 17, he followed his half‑brother, Joseph Hancock, to Liverpool, where Hancock was serving as captain of a sailing vessel. Smith began his own maritime apprenticeship that year aboard Senator Weber, owned by A. Gibson & Co. of Liverpool.

=== Marriage and residence ===
On 13 January 1887, Smith married Sarah Eleanor Pennington (most commonly known by her middle name) at St Oswald's Church, Winwick, Lancashire. Their daughter, Helen Melville Smith, was born on 2 April 1898 in Waterloo, Liverpool. When the White Star line transferred its transatlantic operations from Liverpool to Southampton in 1907, the family relocated to a red‑brick, twin‑gabled house named Woodhead on Winn Road, Highfield, Southampton.

=== Family ===
Smith's mother, Catherine, lived in Runcorn, Cheshire, where Smith himself intended to retire. She died there in 1893. His half-sister, Thyrza, died in 1921. Smith's widow, Eleanor, was killed in 1931 after being struck by a taxi in London; she was 69 years old.

Helen Melville Smith, who was known as "Mel", married Sidney Russell-Cooke in January 1922, and they had twins in 1923, Simon and Priscilla. Simon, a pilot in the Royal Air Force, was killed in 1944 during the Second World War. Priscilla married John Constantine Phipps, a lawyer, in 1946 but died after contracting polio a year later; neither had children. Helen died in 1973.

== Career ==
"When anyone asks how I can best describe my experience in nearly 40 years at sea, I merely say, uneventful. Of course there have been winter gales, and storms and fog the like, but in all my experience, I have never been in any accident of any sort worth speaking about...I never saw a wreck and never have been wrecked, nor was I ever in any predicament that threatened to end in disaster of any sort. You see, I am not very good material for a story."

— Captain E.J. Smith, quoted in a 1907 interview.

=== Early commands ===
Smith joined the White Star Line in March 1880 as Fourth Officer of SS Celtic. He served aboard the company's liners to Australia and New York City, where he rose quickly in status. In 1887, he received his first White Star command, Republic. Smith failed his first navigation exam, but passed on his second attempt the following week, and in February 1888 earned his Extra Master's Certificate. He joined the Royal Naval Reserve, receiving a commission as a lieutenant, which entitled him to add "RNR" after his name. In wartime, he could be called upon to serve in the Royal Navy. His ships were entitled to fly the Blue Ensign of the RNR if ten of the crew belonged to the RNR; British merchant vessels generally flew the Red Ensign. Smith retired from the RNR in 1905 with the rank of Commander.

=== Later commands ===
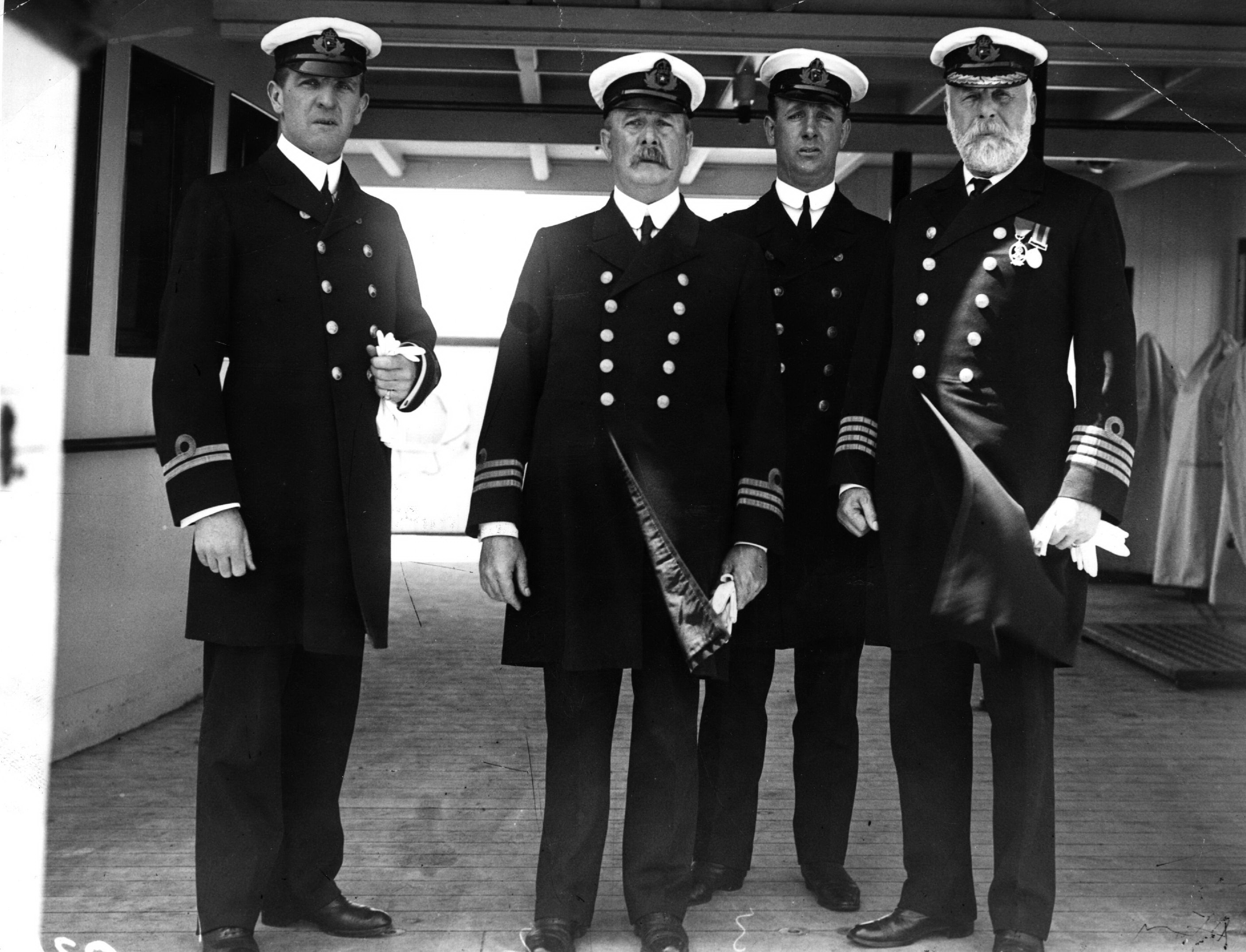
Left to right: William Murdoch, Joseph Evans, David Alexander, and Edward Smith aboard Olympic

Smith was Majestic's captain for nine years from 1895. When the Second Boer War broke out in 1899, Majestic was called upon to transport British Imperial troops to the Cape Colony. Smith made two trips to South Africa, both without incident, and in 1903 King Edward VII awarded him the Transport Medal with the "South Africa" clasp. Smith was regarded as a "safe captain". As he rose in seniority, he gained a following among passengers, some of whom sailed the Atlantic only on a ship he captained.

Smith became known as the "Millionaires' Captain". From 1904, he commanded the White Star Line's newest ships on their maiden voyages. In 1904, he was given command of what was then the largest ship in the world, Baltic. Her maiden voyage from Liverpool to New York, sailing 29 June 1904, passed without incident. After three years with Baltic, Smith was given his second new "big ship", Adriatic. Her maiden voyage also passed without incident. During his command of Adriatic, Smith received the long service Decoration for Officers of the Royal Naval Reserve (RD).

As one of the world's most experienced sea captains, Smith was chosen to take first command of the lead ship in a new class of ocean liners, RMS Olympic – again the largest vessel in the world at that time. The maiden voyage from Southampton to New York concluded on 21 June 1911, but as the ship was docking in New York harbour, a minor incident occurred. Docking at Pier 59 under the harbour pilot's command, Olympic was being assisted by twelve tugs when one was caught in her backwash, spun around, collided with the larger ship, and for a moment was trapped under Olympic's stern before working free and limping to the docks.

=== Hawke incident ===
On 20 September 1911, Olympic's first major mishap occurred during a collision with a British warship HMS Hawke, in which the warship lost her prow. Although the collision left two of Olympic's compartments flooded and one of her propeller shafts twisted, she was able to limp back to Southampton. At the inquiry, the Royal Navy blamed Olympic, finding that her massive size generated a suction that pulled Hawke into her side. Smith had been on the bridge during the events.

The Hawke incident was a financial disaster for White Star, and the out-of-service time for the liner made matters worse. Olympic returned to Belfast and, to speed repairs, Harland and Wolff delayed Titanic's completion to use one of her propeller shafts and other parts for Olympic. Back at sea in February 1912, Olympic lost a propeller blade and again returned for emergency repairs. To get her back to service immediately, Harland and Wolff again pulled resources from Titanic, delaying her maiden voyage from 20 March to 10 April.

== Titanic ==
Despite the past trouble, Smith was again appointed to command the newest ship in the Olympic class when Titanic left Southampton for her maiden voyage. On 30 March, Smith left the Olympic at Southampton and made a quick trip to Belfast. He arrived in time to take command of Titanic on 1 April, relieving Herbert James Haddock. On 9 April, as Titanic was docked in Southampton, Smith went ashore and stayed overnight at his home on Winn Road to spend time with his wife and daughter. Some sources state that he intended to retire after Titanic's maiden voyage, in order to spend more time with his family. (Note: Although two press stories in the Halifax Morning Chronicle published after the disaster reported that Smith would have remained in charge of Titanic "until the Company (White Star Line) completed a larger and finer steamer", the reference is regarded as vague, casting shadow of suspicion on the sources, despite purportedly coming from White Star Officials.)

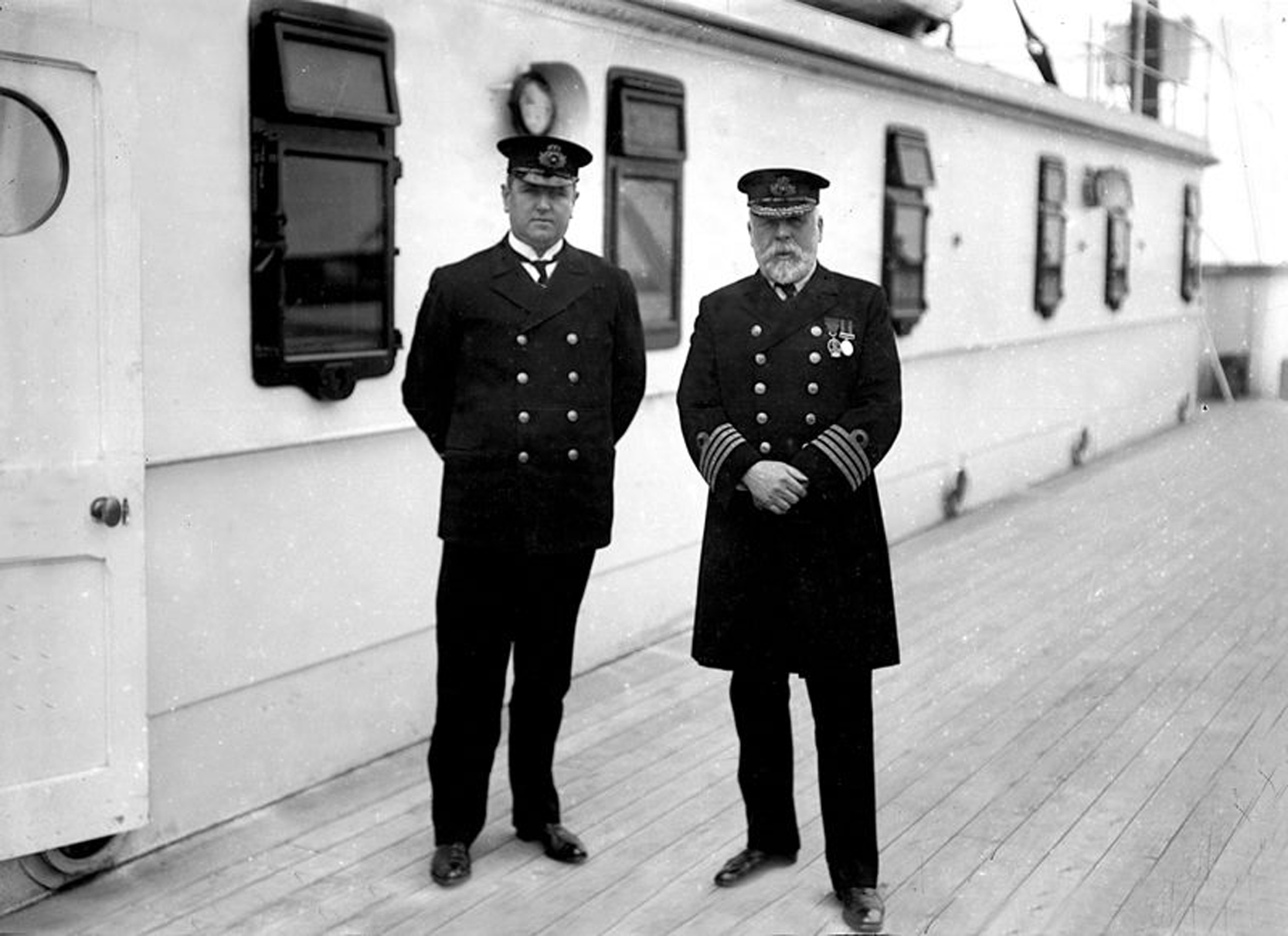
Smith (right) with Chief Purser Hugh McElroy on 11 April 1912, one of the last photos taken of either man.

On 10 April 1912, Smith left his home at 7:00 a.m. The local paperboy, 11-year-old Albert Benham, recalled Smith saying "Alright son, I'll take my paper." Smith proceeded to Berth 44, arriving at 7:30 a.m. At 8:00 a.m., he was onboard Titanic to prepare for the Board of Trade muster. Artist Norman Wilkinson, acquainted with Smith, asked a quartermaster for Smith's whereabouts; the quartermaster took him to the Captain, who was in his cabin. Smith welcomed Wilkinson warmly but said he was too busy to conduct them on a personal tour of the liner, instead asking one of the pursers to show them around. On the bridge, Smith received the sailing report from Chief Officer Henry Wilde and finished his paperwork. After departure at noon, the water displaced by Titanic caused the laid-up New York to break from her moorings and swing towards Titanic. Quick action by the tender Vulcan, which moved between the ships, averted a premature end to the maiden voyage.

On the evening of April 12, Smith dined with Bruce Ismay in the first-class restaurant on B Deck. On the evening of April 13, in the reception room, Smith entertained a party by telling them the "ship could be cut crosswise in three places and each piece would float". On 14 April, Titanic's wireless operators received six messages from other ships warning of drifting ice, which passengers had begun to notice during the afternoon.

Although the crew was aware of ice in the vicinity, they did not reduce the ship's speed and continued to steam at 22 knots (41 km/h; 25 mph). (Note: Despite the later claim, featured for example in the 1997 film Titanic, the ship Titanic was not attempting to set a transatlantic speed record; the White Star Line had made a conscious decision not to compete with their rivals Cunard on speed, but instead to focus on size and luxury.) Titanic's high speed in waters where ice had been reported was later criticised as reckless, but it reflected standard maritime practice at the time. According to Fifth Officer Harold Lowe, the custom was "to go ahead and depend upon the lookouts in the crow's nest and the watch on the bridge to 'pick up' the ice in time to avoid hitting it."

North Atlantic liners prioritised time-keeping above all other considerations, sticking to schedules that guaranteed arrival at advertised times. They were frequently driven at close to full speed, treating hazard warnings as advisories rather than calls to action. It was widely believed that ice posed little risk; close calls were not uncommon, and even head-on collisions had not been disastrous. In 1907, SS Kronprinz Wilhelm, rammed an iceberg and suffered a crushed bow but completed her voyage. That same year Smith declared in an interview that he could not "imagine any condition which would cause a ship to founder. Modern shipbuilding has gone beyond that."

On that morning of 14 April, Smith conducted Sunday worship in the First Class Dining Saloon, concluding with the hymn "Eternal Father, Strong to Save". At 12:45 p.m., he came onto the bridge. That evening, he attended a large dinner party in the B Deck restaurant, reportedly held in his honour. Salon Steward Thomas Whiteley stated that Smith talked and joked with John Jacob Astor. At 9:00 p.m., Smith conferred with Lightoller on the bridge, and they agreed that they should be able to see an iceberg with enough time to avoid it. Smith left the bridge, saying, "If it becomes at all doubtful, let me know." At around 10 p.m., Smith went with Fourth Officer Joseph Boxhall to the chart room, where Boxhall gave him the ship's position.

Titanic collided with an iceberg at 11:40 p.m. ship's time, tearing a series of gashes in her starboard hull below the waterline and opening six of her forward watertight compartments to the sea. Smith immediately appeared on the navigation bridge from his cabin, where he was informed by First Officer William Murdoch of the collision. It was soon apparent that the ship was seriously damaged; Smith ordered the engines to stop and asked Boxhall to get designer Thomas Andrews. At around midnight, Smith left the bridge alone, possibly to make an inspection of the flooding below. Upon returning, he gave a precautionary order for the crew to begin uncovering and clearing the boats.

Isaac Frauenthal saw Astor approach Smith and say, "Captain, my wife is not in good health. She has gone to bed, and I don't want to get her up unless it is absolutely necessary. What is the situation?" Smith advised Astor to awaken his wife, as they might have to take to the boats. Astor "never changed expression...thanked the Captain courteously and walked rapidly, but composedly away". Stewardess Annie Robinson saw Smith on E Deck heading towards the Mail Room with a mail clerk and Chief Purser Hugh McElroy. She saw him return with Andrews and overheard Andrews saying, "Well, three have gone already, Captain"; Smith and Andrews separated; Smith headed to the bridge, Andrews stayed below. At 12:15 a.m., Smith ordered lifeboats swung out and passengers brought on deck with lifebelts. He told Junior Marconi Harold Bride and senior wireless operator John "Jack" Phillips to prepare to send a call for assistance. He moved along the decks telling passengers to put lifebelts on. At 12:25 a.m., Andrews reported that the first five compartments had been breached and that Titanic would sink in under two hours. Smith, an experienced seaman with 40 years at sea and 27 in command, would have known that even with full lifeboats, more than a thousand people would remain onboard with little chance of survival.

It is often claimed that Smith was ineffective, indecisive, or suffered a breakdown as he grasped the enormity of the disaster. Careful research of eyewitness accounts disputes this, describing Smith as taking charge and behaving coolly. He immediately investigated the damage, made two inspection trips below deck, and prepared the wireless operators to call for help. He erred on the side of caution by ordering lifeboats prepared and passengers put in lifebelts before Andrews confirmed the ship was sinking. Smith was seen across the decks overseeing and helping to load lifeboats, interacting with passengers, and instilling urgency while avoiding panic by not publicly announcing that the ship was certain to sink.

After speaking with Andrews, Smith gave the order to begin loading women and children into the boats. He privately told Boxhall that the ship would sink. Second Officer Lightoller later recalled cupping both hands over Smith's ears to communicate over escaping steam and shouting, "Hadn't we better get the women and children into the boats, sir?" Smith nodded. He ordered Lightoller and Murdoch to "put the women and children in and lower away". He directed passengers to the Promenade Deck to board Boat No. 4 and personally assisted with Boats 8, 6, and 2, ordering Major Arthur Peuchen in. He checked on the bridge with Boxhall to fire rockets. When passenger Eloise Hughes Smith pleaded for her husband to accompany her, Smith ignored her and repeated through his megaphone the order of women and children first.

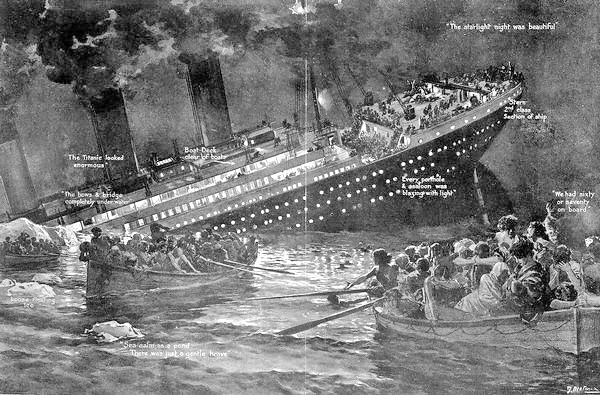
Illustration of the sinking of the Titanic

Just minutes before the final plunge, Smith began releasing the crew from duty. He released Bride and Phillips from the wireless room, then made a final tour of the deck, telling crew members: "Now it's every man for himself." At 2:10 a.m., as Steward Edward Brown assisted men in attempting to launch Collapsible Boat A, Smith, megaphone in hand, said, "Well, boys, do your best for the women and children, and look out for yourselves." (Note: Some press reports claimed that Smith advised crewmen with the words "Be British, boys. Be British!" Not one of the surviving crew members claimed he uttered such words, so this is regarded as a myth.) Smith returned to the bridge. A few minutes later, Trimmer Samuel Hemming found it apparently empty. At 2:20 a.m., Titanic sank. Smith perished along with around 1,500 others; his body was never recovered.

=== Death ===
Conflicting accounts of Smith’s death emerged after the disaster. Initial rumours claimed that Smith shot himself. Some press reports speculated that he chose to go down with his ship and died on the bridge when it was engulfed by the sea. The New York Herald of 19 April 1912 quoted Robert Williams Daniel as having seen Smith on the bridge, waist-high in water. Daniel's account is unlikely, as he jumped from the stern as the ship sank.

Smith had made statements hinting that he might go down with his ship if confronted with a disaster. A friend of Smith's, Dr. Williams, asked him what would happen if the Adriatic struck ice and was damaged. "Some of us would go to the bottom with the ship," Smith replied. A boyhood friend, William Jones, said, "Ted Smith passed away just as he would have loved to do. To stand on the bridge of his vessel and go down with her was characteristic of all his actions when we were boys together." This belief has been perpetuated in various portrayals of the disaster, including the 1958 film A Night to Remember and the 1997 film Titanic.

Alternatively, Smith may have jumped overboard from the bridge—after entering the bridge from the starboard side—after giving the command to abandon ship to crew on the port side. When working to free Collapsible B, Harold Bride said he saw Smith dive from the bridge into the sea just as Collapsible B was levered off the roof of the officers' quarters. This is backed by first-class passenger Eleanor Widener, who was in Lifeboat No. 4 (the closest to the sinking ship) at the time, and second-class passenger William John Mellors, who survived aboard Collapsible B, both of whom stated that Smith jumped from the bridge. Additionally, mess steward Cecil Fitzpatrick claimed to have seen Smith on the bridge just a few minutes before the ship began its final plunge. He was said to be with Andrews. The two put on lifebelts; Smith told Andrews, "We cannot stay any longer; she is going!" Fitzpatrick saw Andrews and Smith both jump overboard just as the water reached the bridge.

There is circumstantial evidence that Smith may have died in the water near the overturned Collapsible B. Colonel Archibald Gracie reported that an unknown swimmer approached the capsized and overcrowded boat. One of the men onboard told him, "Hold on to what you have, old boy. One more of you aboard would sink us all." The swimmer replied, in a powerful voice, "All right boys. Good luck and God bless you." He did not ask to come aboard, but encouraged the occupants, saying "Good boys! Good lads!" with "the voice of authority". Fireman Walter Hurst tried to reach him with an oar, but the man had died. Hurst said he was certain the swimmer was Smith. Gracie said he heard men on Collapsible B, including stoker Harry Senior and entrée cook Isaac Maynard, say that the swimmer was Smith.

Some accounts also describe Smith carrying a child to the boat, with press reports saying that Maynard had retrieved a baby from the captain. No baby was saved from Collapsible B, and second-class passenger Elizabeth Nye gave a press interview saying she had heard the child had died. Lightoller, who survived on Collapsible B, never reported seeing Smith in the water or receiving a child from him. Many have questioned whether survivors on Collapsible B would have been able to identify an individual under such dimly lit and chaotic conditions.

== Legacy ==
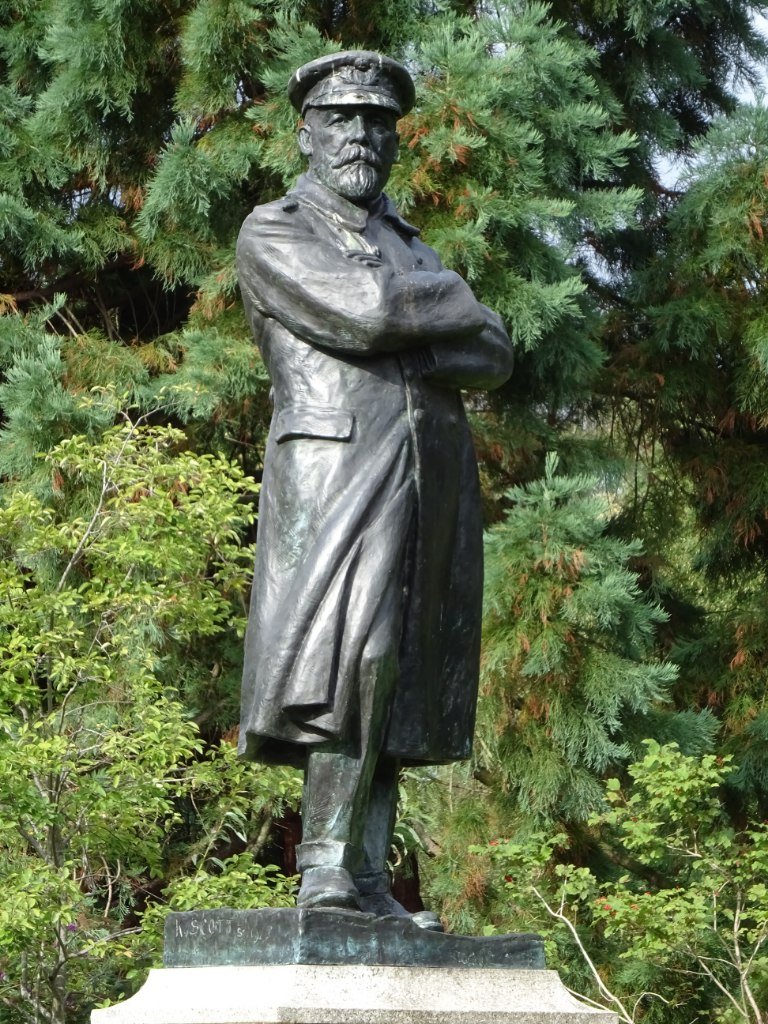
Smith's statue in Beacon Park, Lichfield

Eleanor Smith wrote a letter of condolence to family members and friends of those who perished in the sinking, which was posted outside the White Star Line offices in London on April 18: "To my poor fellow sufferers: My heart overflows with grief for you. I am laden with sorrow that you should be weighed down with this terrible burden that has been thrust upon us. I pray God will comfort all."

A statue of Smith, sculpted by Kathleen Scott, widow of Antarctic explorer Robert Falcon Scott, was unveiled in July 1914 at the western end of the Museum Gardens in Beacon Park, Lichfield. The pedestal is made from Cornish granite and the figure is bronze. Lichfield was chosen because Smith was a Staffordshire man and the city was the centre of the diocese. The statue cost £740 (£70,000 with inflation) raised through local and national contributions.

In 2010, as part of the "Parks for People" programme, the statue was restored and the green patina removed at a cost of £16,000. In 2011, an unsuccessful campaign sought to move the statue to Smith’s hometown of Hanley.

Smith had already been commemorated in Hanley Town Hall with a plaque reading: "This tablet is dedicated to the memory of Commander Edward John Smith RD, RNR. Born in Hanley, 27th Jany 1850, died at sea, 15th April 1912. Whilst in command of the White Star SS Titanic that great ship struck an iceberg in the Atlantic Ocean during the night and speedily sank with nearly all who were on board. Captain Smith having done all man could do for the safety of passengers and crew remained at his post on the sinking ship until the end. His last message to the crew was 'Be British.'"

The plaque was removed in 1961, given to a local school, and later returned to the Town Hall, where it was remounted inside the building in 1978. The Titanic Brewery in Burslem, Stoke-on-Trent, is named in honour of Smith. As a member of the Royal Naval Reserve, Smith wore his two decorations when in uniform: the Decoration for Officers of the Royal Naval Reserve and the Transport Medal.

=== Portrayals ===
On screen, Smith has been portrayed by:

- Otto Rippert (1912) (In Nacht und Eis)
- Otto Wernicke (1943) (Titanic)
- Brian Aherne (1953) (Titanic)
- Noel Drayton (1955) You Are There: The Sinking of the Titanic (TV episode, 22 May 1955)
- Clarence Derwent (1956) (Kraft Television Theatre) (A Night to Remember)
- Laurence Naismith (1958) (A Night to Remember)
- Michael Rennie (1966–1967) (The Time Tunnel), 2 episodes (fictionalised as "Captain Malcolm Smith")
  - Season 1: Episode 1: Rendezvous With Yesterday
  - Season 1: Episode 30: Town of Terror
- Harry Andrews (1979) (S.O.S. Titanic) (TV Movie)
- Hugh Reilly (1983) (Voyagers!) (Voyagers of the Titanic)
- Harry Andrews (1996) (Danielle Steel's No Greater Love)
- George C. Scott (1996) (Titanic) (TV Miniseries)
- John Cunningham (1997) (Titanic) (Broadway Musical)
- Bernard Hill (1997) (Titanic)
- Ron Rutherford (1998) (Titanic: Secrets Revealed)
- Frank von Kuegelgen (1999) (The Legend of the Titanic) (Animated Film)
- Kenneth Belton (2000) (Titanic: The Legend Goes On) (Animated Film)
- Paul Greenberg (2002) (Thumbtanic) (Short Film)
- John Donovan (2003) (Ghosts of the Abyss) (Documentary)
- Alan Rothwell (2005) (Titanic: Birth of a Legend) (TV Documentary)
- Malcolm Tierney (2008) (The Unsinkable Titanic) (TV Documentary)
- Christian Rodska (2011) (Curiosity, episode: "What Sank Titanic?") (TV episode)
- David Calder (2012) (Titanic) (TV series/4 episodes)
- Ivor Charles (2012) (Titanic: Case Closed) (TV documentary)
- John Smithers (2012) (After the Titanic) (Documentary)
- Michael Cochrane (2012) (Titanic: Blood and Steel) (TV series/4 episodes/Episodes 1, 9 & 11–12)
- Philip Rham (Titanic: The Musical) (Southwark Playhouse, 2013, and Charing Cross Theatre, London, 2016)
- Phill Jupitus (2016) – Drunk History (British TV series): Season 2: Episode 2: "Scott of the Antarctic/Sinking of the Titanic"
- Xander Bailey (2022) (Titanic 666) (TV movie)
- Martin Wimbush (2023) – Fred (short film)
- Gerry O'Brien (2025) - Titanic Sinks Tonight (BBC 4-part drama-documentary series)

== Bibliography ==
- Cooper, G.J. (2011). Titanic Captain: The Life of Edward John Smith. The History Press. ISBN 978-0-7524-6072-7.
- Fitch, Tad; Layton, J. Kent; Wormstedt, Bill (2012). On A Sea of Glass: The Life & Loss of the R.M.S. Titanic. Amberley Books. ISBN 978-1848689275.
- Parkes, Dan E. (2025). Titanic Legacy: The Captain, the Daughter and the Spy. Amberley Publishing. ISBN 978-1398124356.
