= Titanic navigation bridge =

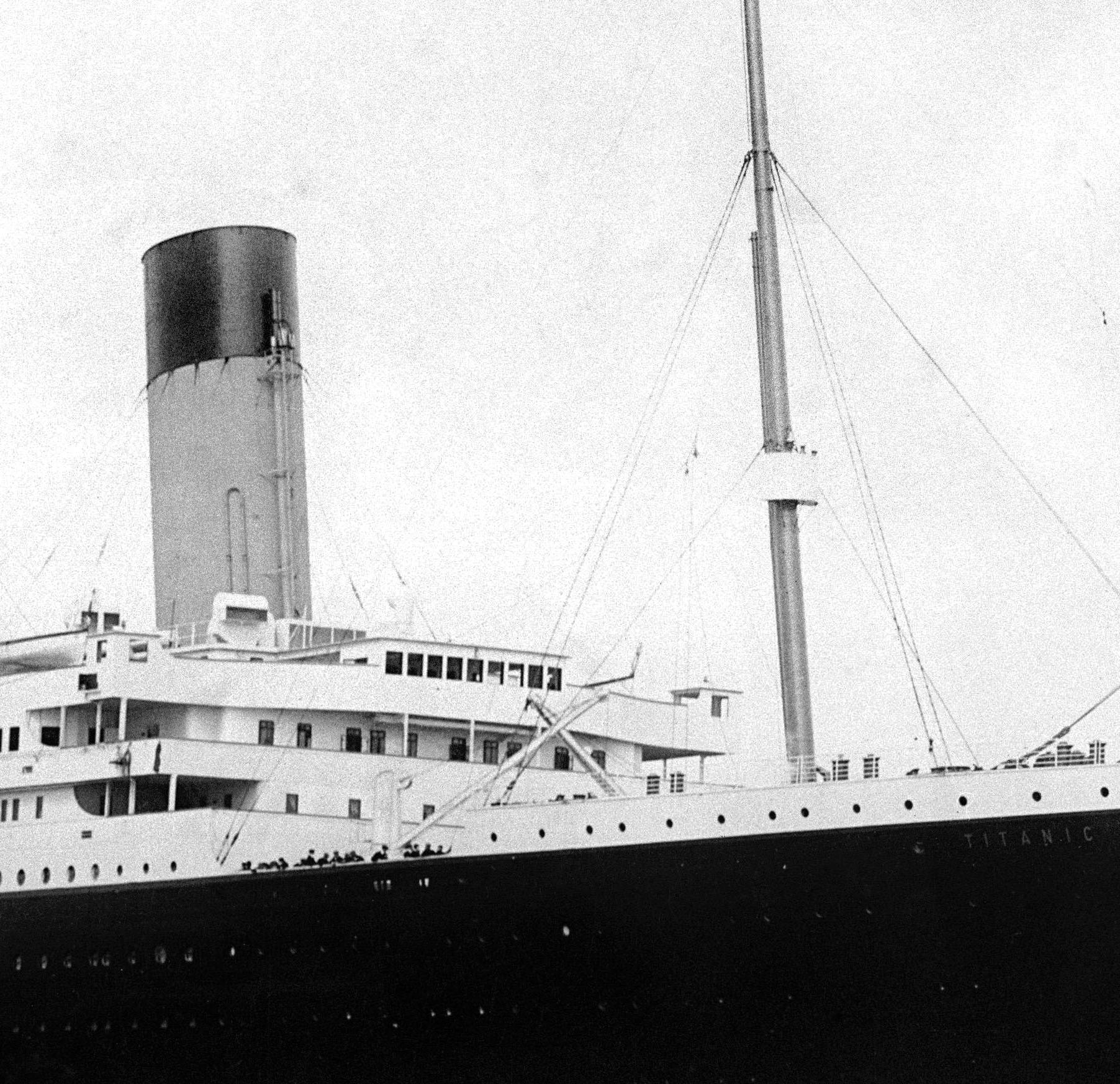
The navigation bridge of Titanic

On the British ocean liner RMS Titanic, the navigation bridge (or command bridge) was a superstructure where the ship's command was exercised. From this location, the officer of the watch determined the ship's geographical position, gave all orders regarding navigation and speed, and received information about everything happening on board.

The bridge was composed of various compartments: a navigation shelter where watch was kept, and the wheelhouse where a wheel was located, known as the helm in maritime language, which steered the rudder and transmitted orders to the engines, also called a chadburn. On either side to starboard and port of the navigation shelter, two exterior wings allowed for manoeuvres. There was also a chart room and the captain's watch room. The bridge was also connected to the officers' cabins, which varied in comfort according to rank. It was also close to the wireless telegraphy room. Six officers took turns on watch duty on the bridge, accompanied by quartermasters and other members of the deck crew. The second officer and the captain could also be present if the situation so required.

On 14 April 1912, around 11:40 p.m., decisions to attempt to avoid the iceberg were made from the bridge. After the collision, the order to evacuate the ship was also decided on the bridge. Crushed by the fall of the first funnel, then by that of the foremast, little remained of the bridge when the wreckage of the Titanic was discovered in 1985.

== Location ==
The bridge was the "brain" of the liner and was located in the most appropriate place, in line with the ship's direction of travel, i.e. forward of the boat deck. Situated sixty metres from the bow, the navigation bridge rises some twenty-three metres above the waterline. This gives officers a clear view of the front of the ship and the horizon.

The bridge was accessible from the boat deck on the port and starboard sides. Staircases located forward allowed access from either side of the A deck promenade. It also communicated with the officers' wardroom, located aft of the wheelhouse, at the level of the first funnel. However, access was reserved for officers in charge of navigation and crew members on watch at sea.

Plan of the bridge of Titanic (in French)

== Infrastructures ==
=== Gangway shelter ===
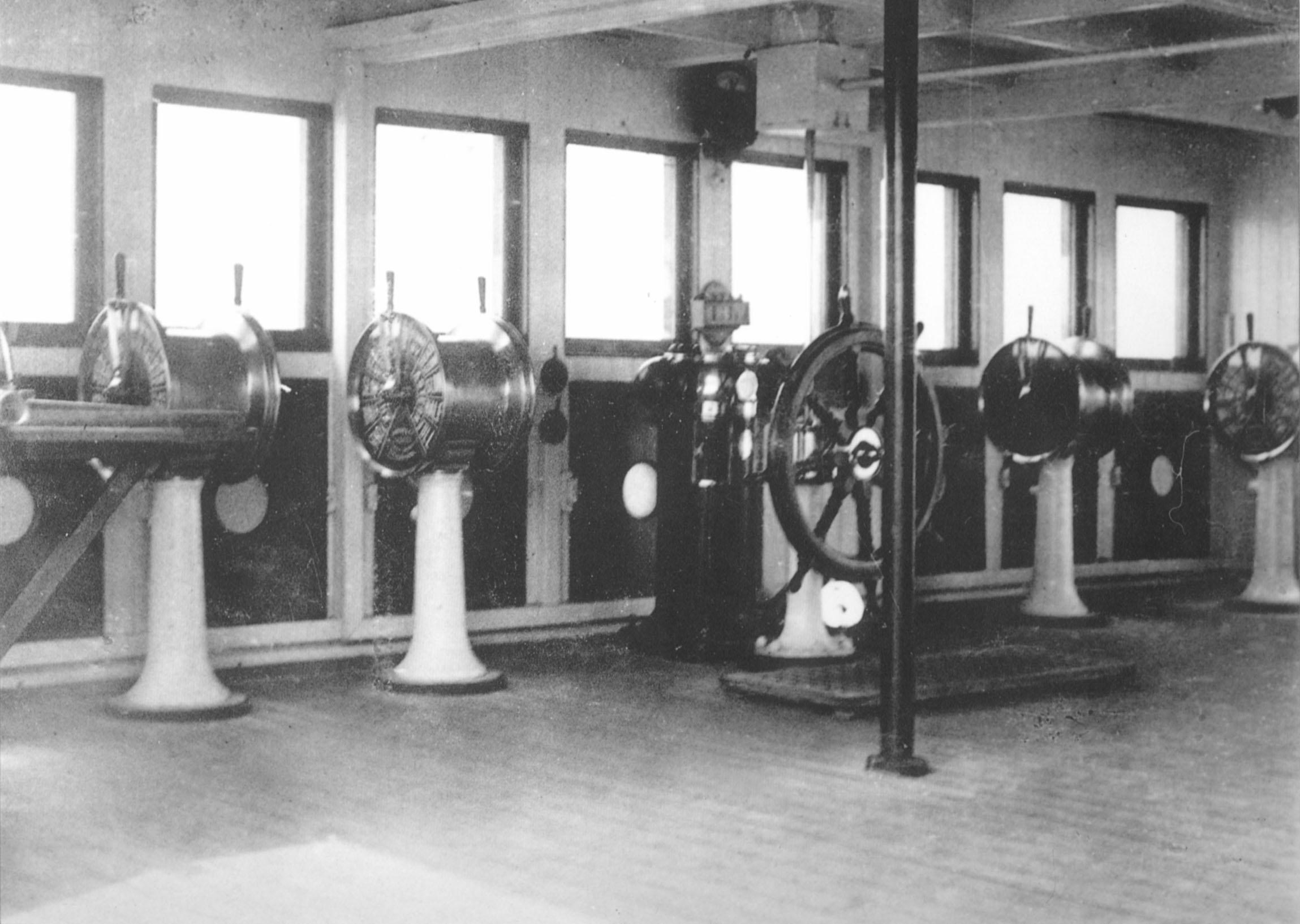
Olympic's bridge shelter, similar to that on Titanic, was equipped with an auxiliary steering wheel and five order transmitters.

At the forward end of the boat deck, there was a shelter and two manoeuvring fins. A railing connected them, lining the front of the deck. The bridge shelter was airy and open on both sides to the officers' promenade. Nine windows gave the helmsman and navigation officers an unobstructed view of the foremast and bow.

==== Auxiliary helm and course compass ====
Under the bridge shelter, there was an auxiliary steering wheel for Titanic's rudder. It was used during harbour entrances and exits, so that the helmsman, working in open space, could more easily hear the successive orders of the manoeuvring officers. The auxiliary helm was also used along the coast, in good weather or hot conditions. It was mechanically connected to the main rudder.

A course compass, manufactured in Glasgow, was located opposite the auxiliary helm, so that the helmsman could see it at all times. The instrument consisted of a wooden base (cockpit) topped by a magnetic compass, fitted with an internal oil light. It indicated the ship's course. In addition, a rudder angle indicator (axiometer) was fixed to the ceiling of the bridge shelter. This electrical indicator told the helmsman the precise angular position of the rudder in relation to the ship's axis. The third officer, Herbert Pitman, was in charge of checking the compass and correcting the compass course with the help of the deviation curve. The officer relied on the bearing compass, located on a platform on the boat deck, between the second and third funnels, in the centre of the liner. Navigation could be astronomical, using the stars and the sun. An identical compass and the main helm were located in the wheelhouse.

==== Order transmitters ====
The bridge shelter contained five telegraphs. These transmitted orders to various installations on the liner. Two of them were connected to the engine room, two others to the gangway. The last was an emergency telegraph, which also communicated with the engine room. It was only used if the other two failed.

The telegraphs connected to Titanic's engine room were used by the officer of the watch or the commanding officer to communicate any orders concerning forward and astern speed.

Forward, the possible orders were, in ascending order of power, Dead Slow, Slow, Half, Full.

The "STOP" command instructed the engine room to stop propeller rotation.

The Stand By command meant that the machine had to be ready. The Dead Slow, Slow, Half and Full commands indicated different levels of propeller revolutions per minute (i.e. power required).

Towards the rear, the power commands were identical.

The Finished With Engines command indicated that the machines were no longer required.

=== Wheelhouse ===
==== Operation ====
The wheelhouse was an innovation in ship steering at the beginning of the 20th century. On Titanic, it enabled the helmsman to steer the ship at night or in cold temperatures. The wheelhouse had five windows arranged so that the view could be extended through the nine windows in the bridge shelter. The helmsman stood on a small platform to maximise his view of the course compass in front of him and the bow of the ship.

At night, the wheelhouse was completely closed. The blinds on the five windows were lowered, and the helmsman relied on the course compass and the orders of the officer of the watch. The purpose of this total closure of the wheelhouse was to enable the quartermaster to concentrate on the course compass, preventing distraction from any outside light. Similarly, the order transmitters were designed to be lit from inside at night, but this lighting was deactivated when the ship was on the high seas, as orders were less common.

==== Telephone system ====
The wheelhouse was equipped with a set of four horn telephones. These were used to communicate with four of the ship's installations, to ensure smooth navigation. The forecastle, crow's nest, engine room and docking gangway were all linked to the wheelhouse. On the evening of the collision, the watchman, Frederick Fleet, used the telephone in the crow's nest to warn the bridge of the presence of the iceberg.

In addition to these telephone installations, Titanic was equipped with a switch to close the watertight doors. On the night of the sinking, this switch was operated by First Officer William Murdoch, closing the compartments. There could have been an indicator, but only the testimony of a sailor confirms this.

==== Other installations ====
In addition to the telephone system, the wheelhouse also included an underwater signal receiver, capable of warning the ship of the approach of a dangerous area. This system worked by means of two boxes, each containing a microphone, placed inside the hull, below the waterline, on the port and starboard sides. Connected to the receiver in the wheelhouse, these boxes received noises identified by bells of different tones, over a distance of up to 20 miles. This indicator was useful when approaching a dangerous place, but also for navigating in fog, as it allowed the liner to be located in relation to the signals picked up.

Titanic's wheelhouse was also equipped with a speed indicator and a clinometer to measure the ship's angle of heel. Lastly, it was equipped with two pendulums, sextants, marine chronometers, thermometers and barometers.

=== Officers' accommodation ===
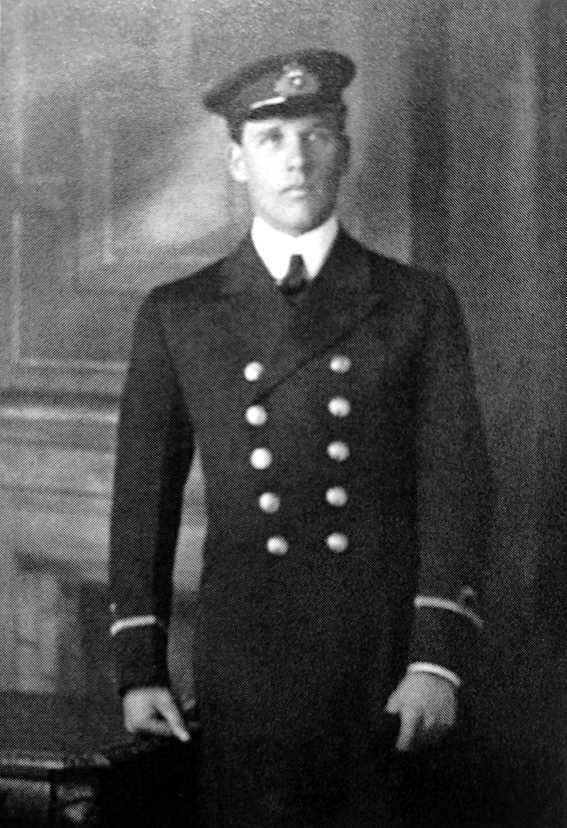
James Moody, Titanic's Sixth Officer

At the back of the wheelhouse, at the level of the first funnel and accessible from the boat deck, were accommodations for the eight navigating officers. The entirety of these accommodations was designated as the "officers' quarters". The captain had the most luxurious apartments, a set of three rooms, a personal bedroom, a lounge, and a bathroom, located on the starboard side. The apartments of the fourth officer and a smoking room were situated on the same side.

On the port side, a corridor provided access to the apartments of the first, second, third, fifth, and sixth officers. The navigation room was a meeting space for the captain and his officers for all matters concerning navigation. The chart room, located just behind the wheelhouse on the port side, contained numerous map portfolios and nautical documents, as well as the two master clocks. These clocks controlled the forty-eight clocks distributed throughout the entire ship. These two main clocks (or marine chronometers) required daily evaluations of their running, as they were never reset to protect their delicate mechanism. For example, while sailing towards America, the clocks gained half an hour each day of navigation. Every day at noon, the fourth officer, Joseph Boxhall, recorded the time discrepancies in the "chronometer log". The chart room also contained the International Code of Signals, as well as Titanic's logbooks and navigation charts. The harbour pilot's cabin adjoined the chart room on the starboard side. It was used during port entries and exits. When pilots boarded the liner, they went to this cabin with the captain to advise on the manoeuvres to be carried out.

Finally, the officers had at their disposal a bathroom located opposite the wireless room.

=== Marconi wireless room ===
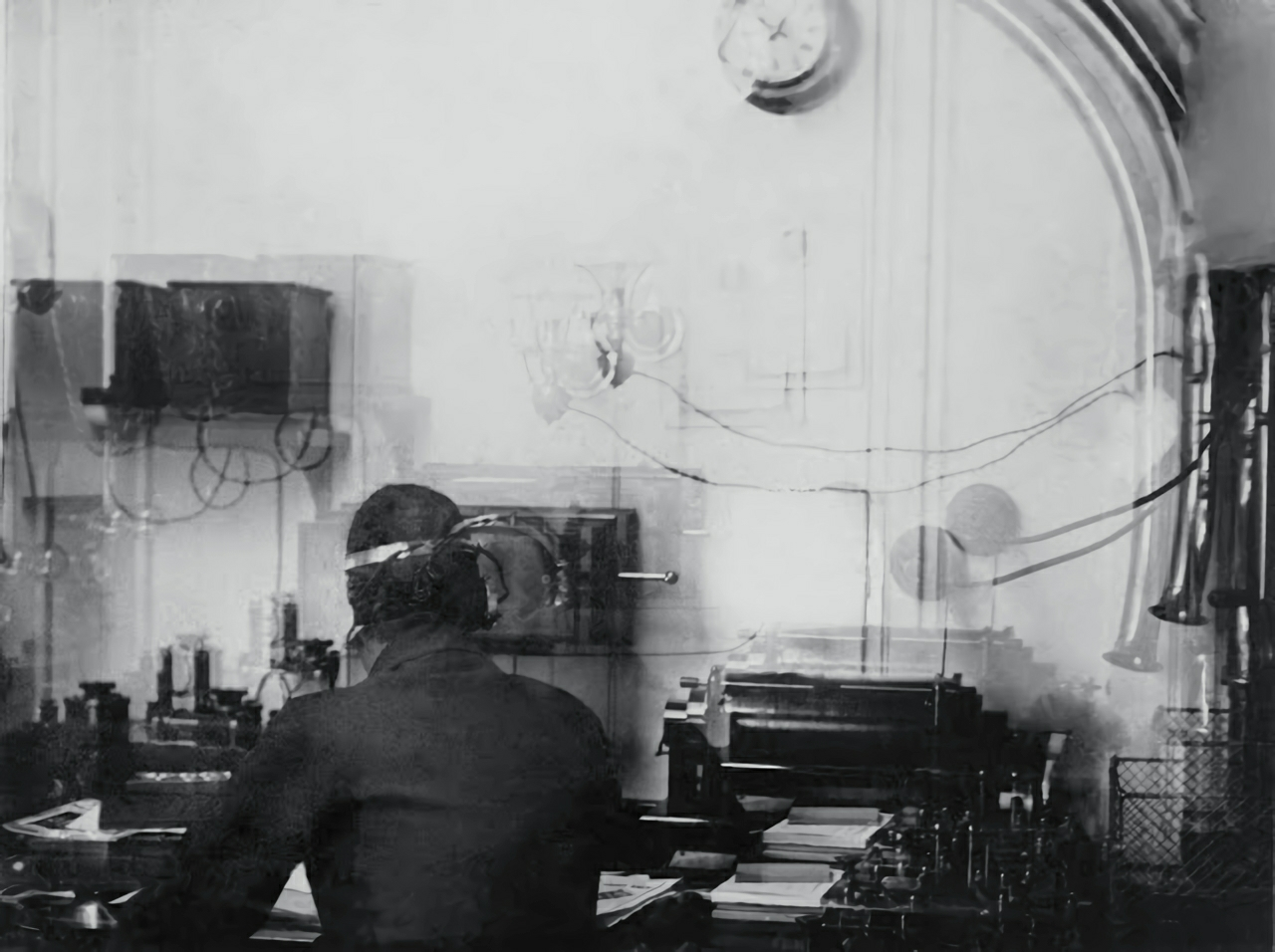
Titanic's wireless room, photographed by passenger Francis Browne, showing second operator Harold Bride from the back. This is the only known image of the ship's wireless room

The Marconi wireless room, whose wireless operators were Jack Phillips (chief operator) and Harold Bride (second operator), was located about 12 m from the forward end of the boat deck, behind the first funnel. It communicated with the bridge via a passageway port of the officers' quarters. It consisted of three rooms.

The room furthest to port was known as the "silent", which contained the radio transmission equipment and an emergency transmitter. From the roof of the "silent", there was a 50 m high vertical radiating radio wire linking four horizontal wires to form the T-shaped antenna. This was where the radio receiver and control equipment were located. Finally, the room furthest to starboard was a rest room, equipped with a bunk. During the voyage, the two wireless operators took it in turns to ensure a permanent listening watch by wireless telegraphy on the 600 metre waveband from Titanic.

At night, Phillips, the chief operator, was on watch from 8:00 P.M. to 2:00 A.M., while Bride was on watch from 2:00 A.M. to 8:00 A.M. During the day, the men took turns for mutual convenience, always ensuring a continuous watch. The operators shared the toilets and showers with the navigation officers. They also had a small lounge on C deck.

==== Radiotelegraphic correspondence ====
Normally, since 1903, (Note: 1903 Radiotelegraph Convention in Berlin by nine countries.) for the exchange of radiotelegraphic correspondence with ships at sea, ships such as Titanic transmitted on a wavelength of 300 metres (1,000 kHz) and listened on a wavelength of 600 metres (500 kHz). (Coast stations normally transmitted on a wavelength of 600 metres and listened on a wavelength of 300 metres). Ships and coast stations were able to transmit and receive on the same wavelength; for example, a ship contacting another ship on the 600 metre wavelength or a ship broadcasting weather information or iceberg positions on the 600 metre wavelength.

=== Docking gangway ===
Overlooking the third-class promenade deck, Titanic's stern bridge was a facility for manoeuvring the ship to dock or handling it in confined spaces. It was arranged transversely to the stern deck and, unlike the main bridge, was not sheltered. It had several facilities, similar to the wheelhouse.

It was equipped with two telegraphs linked directly to two of the order transmitters on the navigation bridge, so that they operated in pairs. One pair was used to communicate orders to the engine room, while the other transmitted manoeuvring and steering orders. It also included Titanic's third steering wheel (along with the one under the bridge shelter and the one in the wheelhouse), used in the event of failure of the main wheel's remote control motor. Finally, the stern bridge had a course compass.

The petty officers were responsible for taking it in turns. On 14 April 1912, George Rowe was on watch. He spent the evening walking and talking to the passengers to keep active and warm, when at around 11.40 pm he was surprised to see an iceberg pass alongside the ship. Remaining at his post, it was only three-quarters of an hour later that he was informed of the situation, when he telephoned fourth officer Joseph Boxhall to tell him that he had just seen a canoe leave. He then returned to the ship's bridge, where he helped fire distress rockets until 1:25 am. Then, at 1:40 am, he was put in charge of folding raft C and survived the sinking.

== Command of the ship on its only crossing ==
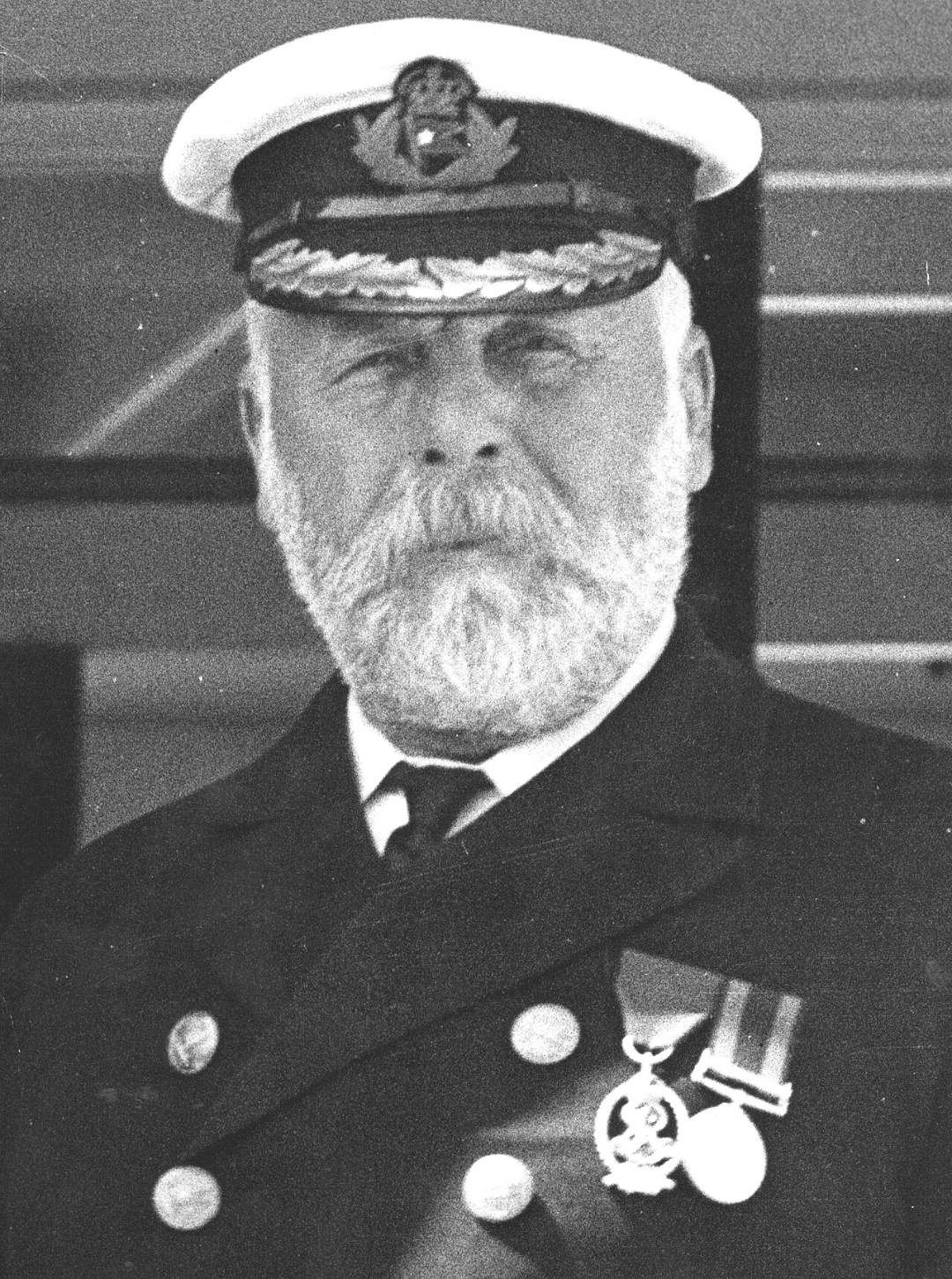
The captain of Titanic, Edward Smith.

The crew assigned to command the ship consisted of the captain and seven navigation officers. The Titanic's captain during her voyage was Captain Edward Smith, the unofficial commodore of the White Star Line. Under him were three senior officers and four junior officers.

The three senior officers were Chief Officer Henry Wilde, First Officer William Murdoch and Second Officer Charles Lightoller. William Murdoch was to have been Titanic's second in command, but at the last minute, Henry Wilde was imposed, demoting Murdoch to first officer and Charles Lightoller to second officer; this last-minute change had the advantage of assigning to Titanic three sailors already experienced in manoeuvring such a ship. David Blair, originally the second officer, left the liner. The senior officers were responsible for the navigation of Titanic during their watch hours. They took turns every four hours as being officer of the watch

During their watch, each senior officer was also accompanied with two junior officers, who worked in pairs. Depending on the watch, the two junior officers were Herbert Pitman, third officer and Harold Lowe, fifth officer or Joseph Boxhall, fourth officer and James Moody, sixth officer. Junior officers were tasked with assisting the senior officer on watch, doing various duties such as going on rounds of the ship, taking readings of ship's speed, and working in the chart room. The officers were also responsible for keeping the bridge log up to date.

== The night of the sinking ==
=== Collision ===
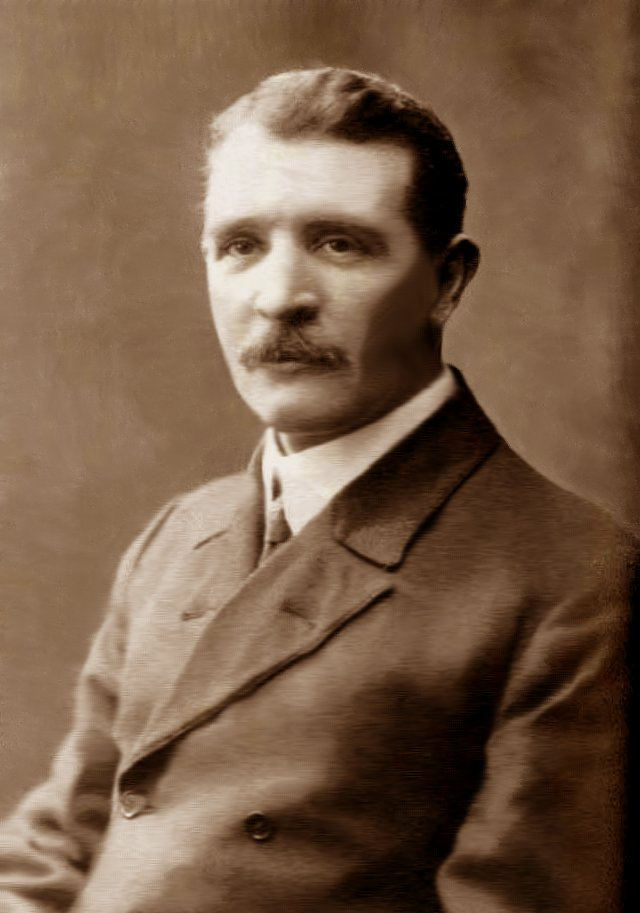
First Officer William McMaster Murdoch.

On the evening of 14 April 1912, at 11:40 pm, while Titanic was travelling at 22.5 knots, an iceberg was spotted by the crow's nest watchmen Frederick Fleet and Reginald Lee. The senior officer of the watch was William McMaster Murdoch; the junior officers were Joseph Boxhall and James Paul Moody. Frederick Fleet immediately rang the crow's nest bell three times, then telephoned the wheelhouse. The sixth officer, Moody, took the call. Fleet alerted him to the presence of an iceberg less than 500 metres in front of the ship.

Moody immediately informed First Officer Murdoch, who ordered the helmsman in the wheelhouse to turn to starboard: "Hard a'starboard ". With this order, Murdoch tried to turn the ship to port. Using the order transmitters, he also ordered the engine room to go astern: "Full astern". However, after the sinking, the chief engineer stated that the order transmitter was indicating "STOP". Titanic finally hit the iceberg, which left gashes in the hull below the waterline which stretched over five compartments. Using the control in the wheelhouse, Murdoch closed the ship's watertight doors. Shortly afterwards, the captain, who was in his quarters, came out after the collision and asked First Officer Murdoch for a report. He also asked for the engines to be completely shut down.

Fourth Officer Boxhall went down to inspect the damage soon after the collision. During his first trip, he did not notice anything unusual. After meeting the ship's carpenter who informed him the cargo hold was taking in water, Boxhall found the damage himself and informed Captain Smith. The captain then ordered a survey of the ship by the ship's carpenter and by Thomas Andrews, one of the ship's architects. Andrews drew up a prognosis after going down with the captain to the lower decks to see the damage, along with the carpenter. Fourth Officer Boxhall went to wake up the off-duty officers Charles Lightoller, Herbert Pitman, and Harold Lowe, and inform them of the collision and damage.

=== Assignment of officers to lifeboats ===
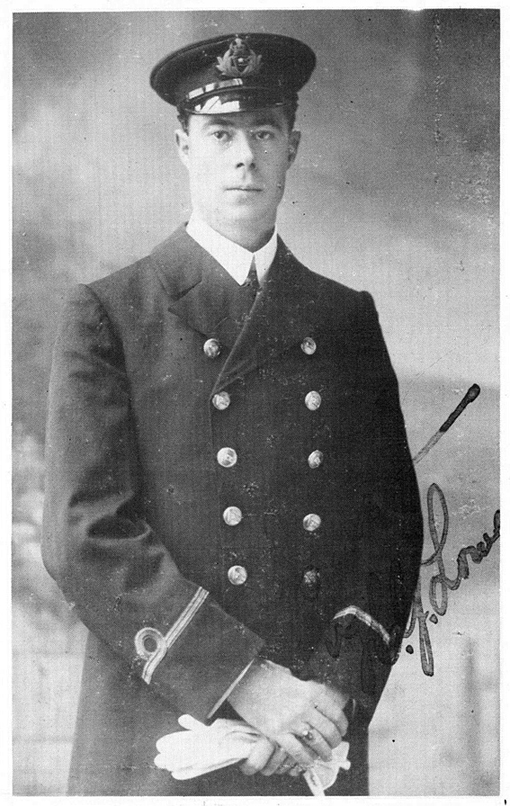
Fifth officer Harold Lowe.

Orders were given to lower the lifeboats and to send wireless messages from the station near the officers' quarters.

The evacuation of the passengers in the lifeboats was organised as follows: First Officer William Murdoch was in charge of all the lifeboats on the starboard side (i.e. all the odd-numbered lifeboats plus collapsible lifeboats A and C), and Second Officer Charles Lightoller was in charge of all the lifeboats on the port side (all the even-numbered lifeboats plus collapsible B and D). The other officers had to assist Murdoch and Lightoller in their tasks. At 12:55 A.M., Third Officer Pitman helped to fill Lifeboat 5 and then boarded it to take command.

Chief Officer Henry Wilde was carefully involved in loading the boats, but Charles Lightoller took control of operations, having had experience of a previous shipwreck. At around 1:30 A.M., Sixth Officer Moody and Fifth Officer Lowe helped load up boats 14 and 16. Lowe and Moody agreed that one of them should take command Lifeboat 14 and look after other launched lifeboats. Moody suggested Lowe go with No. 14 and that he would go away in another boat. In turn, Lowe told him to take No. 16 but, for whatever reason, Moody never took command of No. 16 or any other boat. The fourth officer, Boxhall, boarded Lifeboat 2 at around 1:45 A.M.

Operators Jack Phillips and Harold Bride sent distress messages until shortly after 2:00, when both agreed that messages were no longer transmitting. Two hours and thirty minutes after the collision with the iceberg, the water reached the bridge shelter and the wheelhouse at around 2:00 A.M.

Captain Smith and Chief Officer Wilde, as well as Officers Murdoch and Moody, disappeared in the wreck; their bodies were never recovered. Charles Lightoller survived by climbing onto Collapsible Boat B a few minutes before Titanic sank. He was in the company of Archibald Gracie and second operator Bride. He was the most senior officer to survive the sinking.

At around 4.10 A.M., the first lifeboat was picked up by RMS Carpathia. It was Lifeboat 2, under the command of Joseph Boxhall. Lifeboat 12 was the last boat recovered. Charles Lightoller was the last survivor to board.

=== State of the installations on the wreck ===
After sinking, the Titanic crashed violently to the bottom of the ocean at a depth of almost 3,700 metres. The bridge shelter and wheelhouse were damaged by the fall of the first funnel, then destroyed as the ship fell to the ocean floor. The foremast collapsed onto the port gangway railing.

The crow's nest, shown in the 1986 photographs, has now disappeared, probably having fallen inside the hull. The bronze control formerly attached to the main helm is still present. The officers' quarters and adjacent rooms are in better condition, particularly Commander Smith's cabin. However, the roof of the wireless room is pierced in several places, having been used as a landing platform for submersibles. In 2000, an expedition made it possible to refloat the foot of the wheelhouse bar.

== On Olympic and Britannic ==
Titanic was the second of the three Olympic-class ships. In fact, it benefited from improvements over its predecessor, Olympic, and the lessons learned from the sinking led to a rethink of the gangways on the two surviving sister ships.

On board Olympic, the officers' quarters were organised differently and were smaller. The change in organisation came from J. Bruce Ismay's idea of adding a few first-class cabins on the deck of Titanic's boats. The shape of the wheelhouse also differed from those on Titanic and Britannic. However, it was later modified. A platform for a compass was also placed on top of the wheelhouse following the redesign.

Britannic, which was still under construction when Titanic sank, had its gangway redesigned. The panel for the watertight bulkheads no longer indicated whether they were closed or open, but clearly indicated their position. The order transmitters had also been improved, and a device indicated the precise number of revolutions of the ship's engines. As on Olympic after her refit, the bridge roof housed a compass. Communication between the bridge and the wireless room, which had been lacking on board Titanic, was improved by means of a pneumatic tube linking the two installations. On Olympic, this link was made by telephone.
