= Bertram Fox Hayes =

British sea captain (1864–1941)

Sir Bertram Fox Hayes KCMG DSO RD RNR
- Born: 25 April 1864; Birkenhead, Cheshire, England
- Died: 15 May 1941 (aged 77); Crosby, Lancashire, England
- Occupation: Master Mariner
- Military career
- Allegiance: United Kingdom
- Branch: Royal Naval Reserve
- Rank: Commodore
- Conflicts: Second Boer War; World War I
- Awards: Transport Medal; Distinguished Service Order; Reserve Decoration

Sir Bertram Fox Hayes KCMG DSO RD RNR (25 April 1864 – 15 May 1941) was a sea captain with the White Star Line.

== Life and career ==
Bertram Hayes was born in Birkenhead in Cheshire, He went to sea as a young man serving on windjammers, and gained his Masters Certificate. In 1889 he joined the White Star Line. He was promoted to Master and commanded the SS Britannic, and during the Boer War he took troops to South Africa, carrying 37,000 troops in three years, for which he was awarded the Transport Medal.

He also served on the White Star Line ships Coptic, Teutonic, Germanic, Suevic, Arabic, the Laurentic, in which he inaugurated the company's Canadian service in 1909, and the Adriatic.

Hayes was called as a witness to the British Board of Trade inquiry held after the Titanic disaster, which he attended on 11 June 1912. In his testimony, Hayes was questioned mainly on the subject on routines regarding spotting ice. Hayes described the circumstances on the night of the sinking of the Titanic as "abnormal, which nobody had experienced before".

During the First World War he was appointed Captain of the RMS Olympic when the ship was employed as a troop carrier across the Atlantic and the Mediterranean. In 1917 he was awarded a CMG for his services. On 12 May 1918, en route from New York to Southampton and while in the English Channel, the Olympic, sighted the U-boat SM U-103. After opening fire, the Olympic turned to ram and sank the submarine. For this service, he was awarded the DSO.

He was knighted in 1919 for "valuable services in connection with the transport of troops". Between 1922 and 1924 he captained the RMS Majestic, which was then the world's largest ship, and retired as Commodore of the White Star Line in 1924 when the company reinstated the rank.

In 1925 he published his memoirs, Hull Down, Reminisces of Windjammers, Troops and Travellers.

He remained a bachelor and died on 15 May 1941 at his home in Crosby near Liverpool, three weeks after his 77th birthday.
