= William McMaster Murdoch =

First Officer of RMS Titanic (1873–1912)

Lieutenant William Murdoch RNR
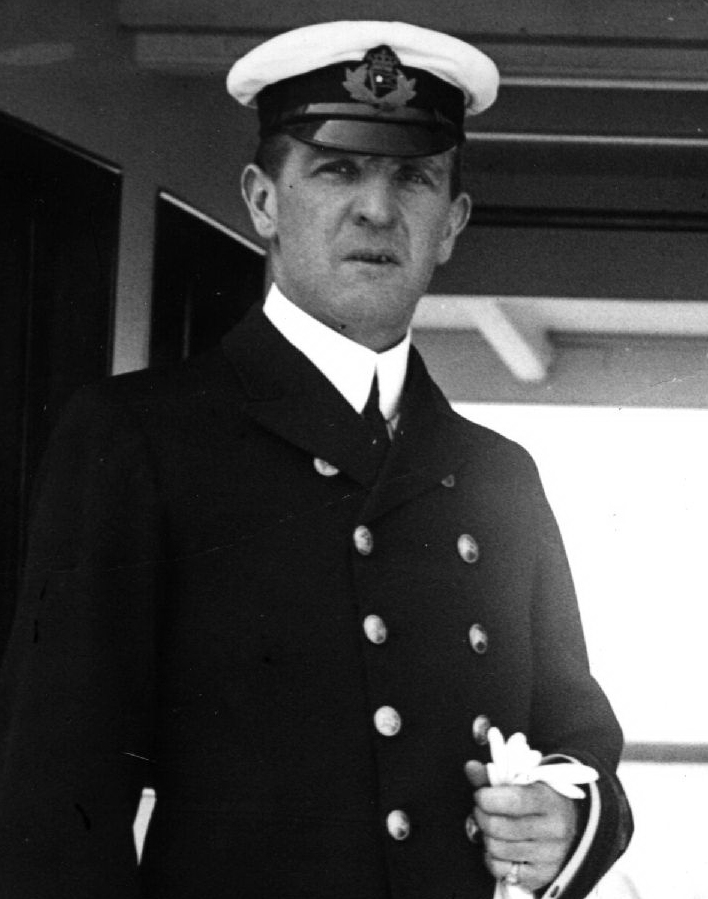
- Murdoch in 1911 serving as First Officer on RMS Olympic
- Born: 28 February 1873; Dalbeattie, Kirkcudbrightshire, Scotland
- Died: 15 April 1912 (aged 39); North Atlantic Ocean
- Other name: Will Murdoch
- Education: Dalbeattie High School
- Occupations: Merchant seaman; Naval officer
- Spouse: Ada Florence Banks (m. 1907)
- Military career
- Allegiance: United Kingdom
- Branch: Royal Naval Reserve
- Rank: Lieutenant

Lieutenant William McMaster Murdoch RNR (28 February 1873 – 15 April 1912) was a British sailor who was the first officer on the RMS Titanic during its ill-fated maiden voyage. He was the officer of the watch when the ship's lookouts spotted an iceberg and, despite his efforts to avoid a collision, the ship took a glancing yet fatal blow on the starboard side. Murdoch was in charge of the starboard side evacuation afterwards and subsequently perished when the ship sank.

== Early life ==
William McMaster Murdoch was born on 28 February 1873 in Dalbeattie in Kirkcudbrightshire (now Dumfries and Galloway), Scotland, the fourth son of Captain Samuel Murdoch, a master mariner, and Jane Muirhead, six of whose children survived infancy. The Murdochs were a long and notable line of Scottish seafarers; his father and grandfather were both sea captains, as were four of his grandfather's brothers.

Murdoch was educated first at the old Primary School in High Street, and then at the Dalbeattie High School in Alpine Street until he gained his diploma in 1887. Finishing schooling, he followed in the family seafaring tradition and was apprenticed for five years to William Joyce & Coy, Liverpool, but after four years (and four voyages) he was so competent that he passed his second mate's certificate on his first attempt.

== Career ==
=== Beginnings ===
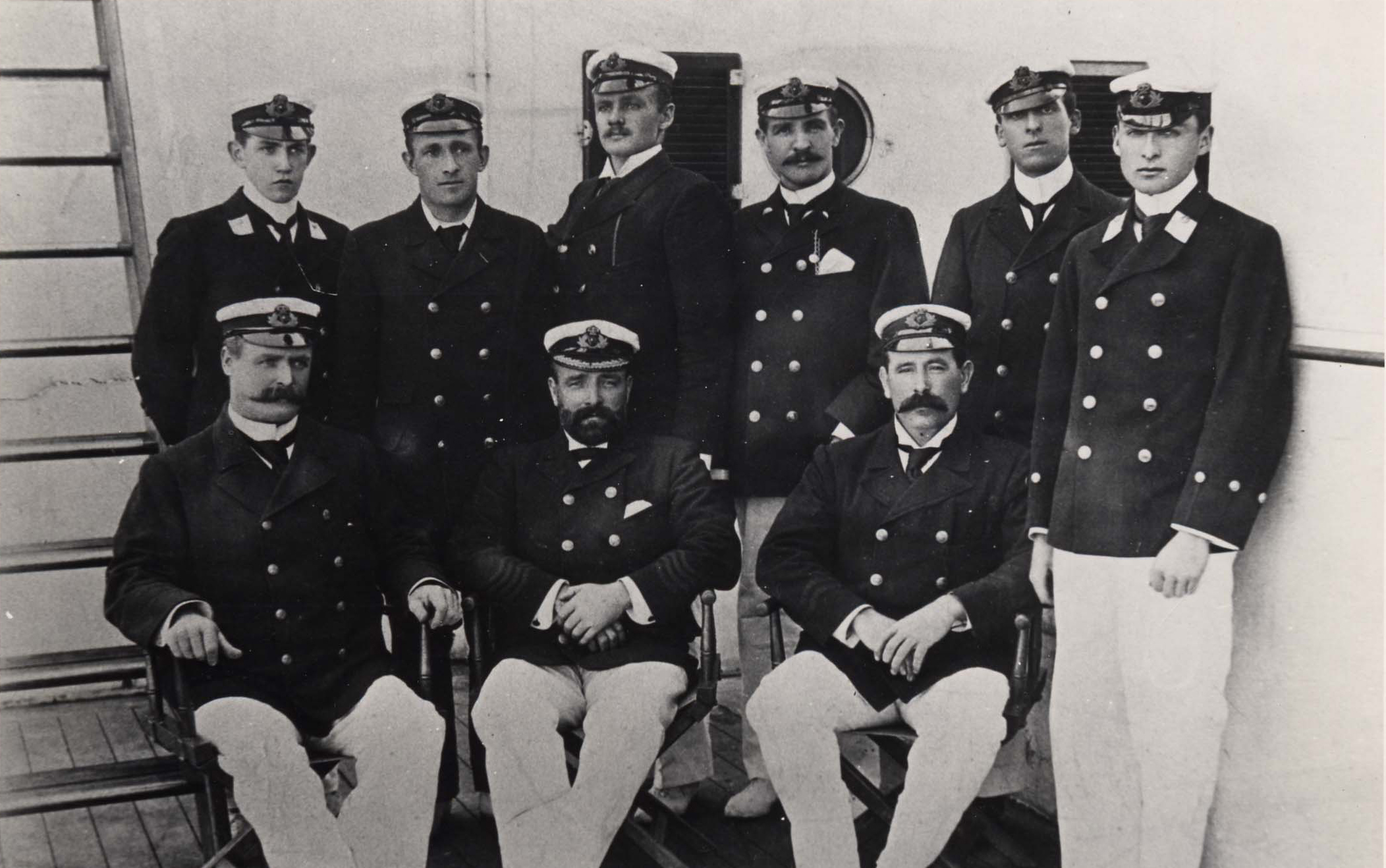
Murdoch (third from right) whilst serving on the SS Medic under Captain J B Ranson (seated centre), circa 1900. On his right is Charles Lightoller, his future shipmate aboard Titanic

He served his apprenticeship aboard the Charles Cosworth of Liverpool, trading to the west coast of South America. From May 1895, he was first mate on the St. Cuthbert, which sank in a hurricane off Uruguay in 1897. Murdoch gained his extra master's certificate at Liverpool in 1896, at age 23.

An officer of the Royal Naval Reserve, he was employed by the White Star Line in 1900. From 1900 to 1912, Murdoch gradually progressed from second officer to first officer, serving on a succession of White Star Line vessels, Medic (1900, along with Charles Lightoller, Titanic's second officer), Runic (1901–1903), Arabic (1903), Celtic (1904), Germanic (1904), Oceanic (1905), Cedric (1906), Adriatic (1907–1911) and Olympic (1911–1912).

During 1903, Murdoch finally reached the stormy and glamorous North Atlantic run as second officer of the new liner Arabic. His cool head, quick thinking and professional judgement averted a disaster when a ship was spotted bearing down on the Arabic at night. His superior, Officer Fox, had ordered for the ship to steer "hard-a-port," but Murdoch rushed into the wheelhouse, brushed aside the quartermaster, and held the ship on course. The two ships missed each other by inches.

=== RMS Olympic ===
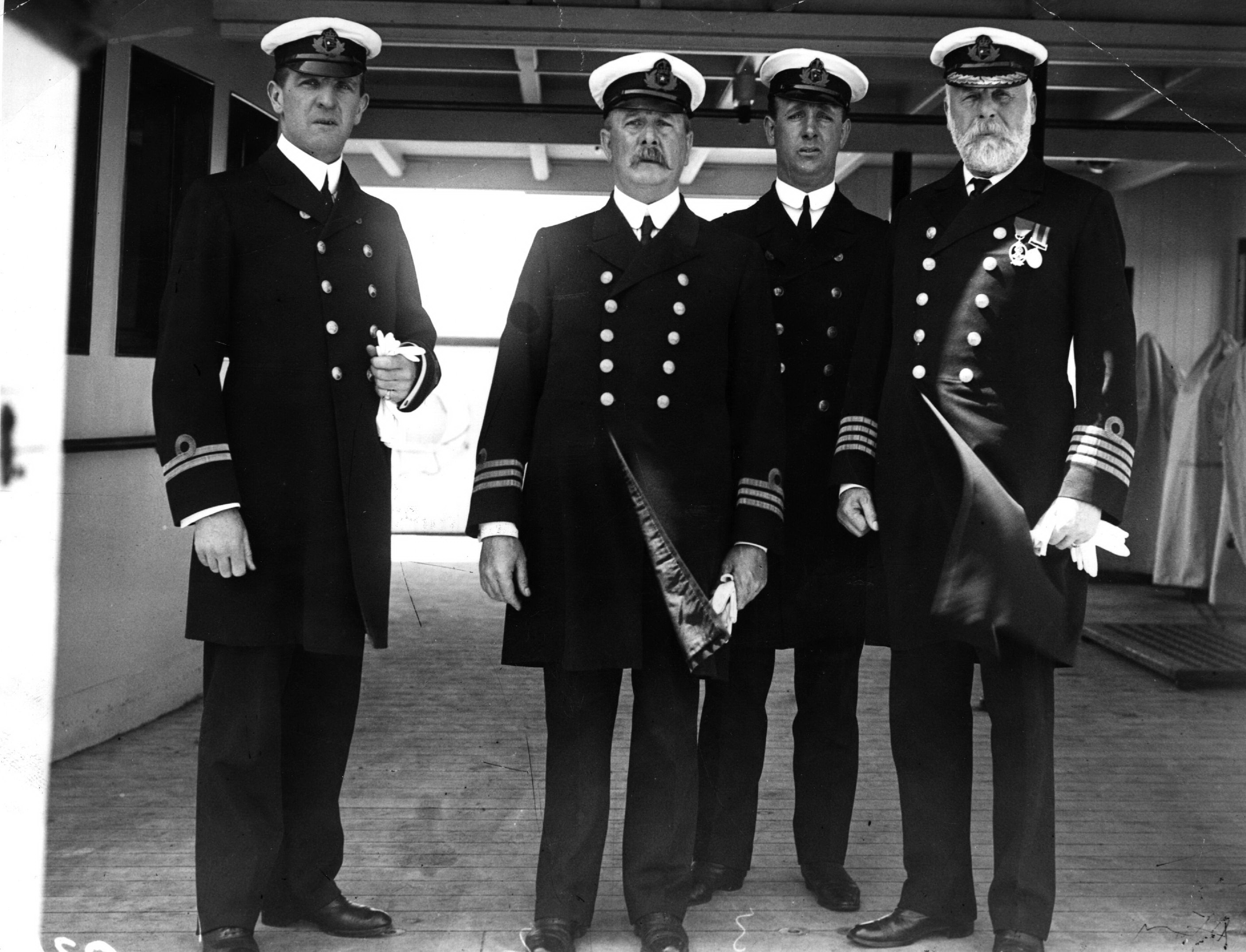
From left to right: Murdoch, Chief Officer Joseph Evans, Fourth Officer David Alexander and Captain Edward J. Smith, all on the Olympic

The final stage of Murdoch's career began in May 1911, when he joined the new RMS Olympic, at 45,000 long tons (46,000 t). Not long before, he had shaved his moustache. Intended to outclass the Cunard Line ships in luxury and size, it needed the most experienced large-liner crew that the White Star Line could find. Captain Edward J. Smith assembled a crew that included Henry Wilde as chief officer, Murdoch as first officer, and Chief Purser Hugh McElroy. On 14 June 1911 Olympic departed on her maiden voyage to New York, with a planned arrival on 21 June.

On 20 September 1911, the Olympic collided with the Royal Navy cruiser HMS Hawke, badly damaging her hull. Since Murdoch was at his departure station at the stern, he appeared at the incident inquiry and gave evidence. The collision was a major financial loss for the White Star Line, as the voyage to New York was abandoned and the ship returned to Belfast for repairs, which took six weeks.

Murdoch returned to the Olympic on 11 December 1911, serving in that capacity until March 1912. During that time, there were two further, though lesser, incidents, striking a sunken wreck and needing to have a broken propeller replaced, and nearly running aground while leaving Belfast. Upon arriving in Southampton, Murdoch learned that his next assignment would be as the chief officer of the Titanic, the Olympic's sister ship, serving under Captain Edward J. Smith. Charles Lightoller later wrote that "three very contented chaps" headed north to Belfast, for he had been appointed first officer, and their friend David Blair was set to be the second officer.

=== RMS Titanic ===
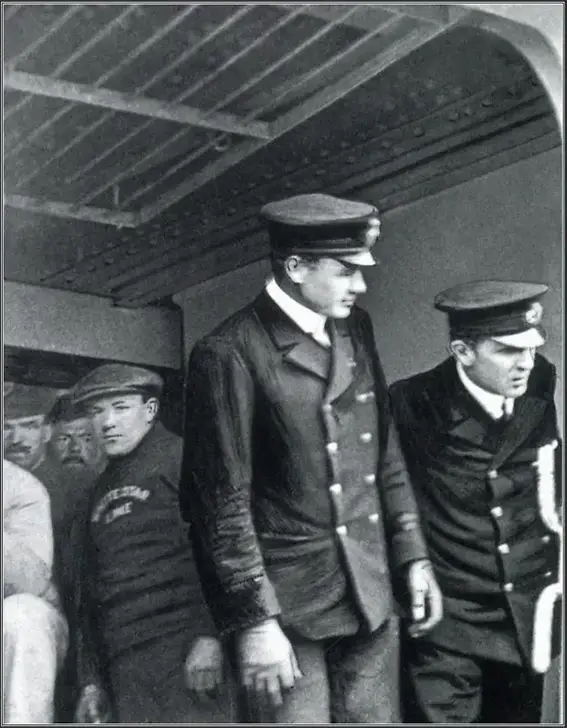
Second Officer Charles Lightoller (left) and First Officer Murdoch (right) closing the Titanic gangway before departure from Queenstown, Ireland, 11 April 1912. This is the last ever photograph taken of Murdoch.

Murdoch, with an "extra master's certificate" and a reputation as a "canny and dependable man", had climbed through the ranks of the White Star Line to become one of its foremost senior officers. Murdoch was originally given the title chief officer for RMS Titanic's maiden voyage. On March 27, 1912, the ship's four junior officers came aboard and reported to Murdoch. Murdoch ordered Fifth Officer Lowe and Sixth Officer Moody to inspect the starboard-side lifeboats and to make sure their equipment was complete; he ordered Third Officer Pitman and Fourth Officer Boxhall to do likewise with the port-side lifeboats.

However, almost as soon as the ship had tied up in Southampton, Captain Edward Smith brought Henry Wilde in as his chief officer (from a previous assignment as Chief Officer of the Olympic), so Murdoch became the first officer. Charles Lightoller was in turn reduced to second officer, and the original second officer, David Blair, did not sail with Titanic at all. When the ship began her maiden voyage on 10 April, Murdoch was on the poop deck, in charge of the mooring lines, being assisted by Third Officer Pitman. As the ship went out into the Atlantic, Murdoch took the 10:00-2:00 watches every mid-day and night. It was his responsibility to draw up the list of boat assignments, and he followed through on this promptly after departing from Southampton.

==== Night of the sinking ====
On 14 April 1912, Murdoch had the 10:00 a.m. to 2:00 p.m. watch on the bridge. However, the officers' lunch was served at 12:30. Lightoller returned to the bridge at that time to relieve Murdoch and let him grab a quick bite to eat. Murdoch did not return until 1:00–1:05 p.m. When Murdoch returned, Lightoller mentioned that Captain Smith had given him a message regarding ice. Murdoch showed no surprise, but Lightoller was under the impression that the subject was new to the first officer, just as it had been to him. Dinner for the officers was served at 6:30 p.m. in the Officers' Mess. Murdoch, then off duty, had taken the opportunity to have his meal.

Then he headed up to the bridge, arriving at 7:05 p.m.. Upon arrival, he took the watch for a half-hour so that Lightoller could have his own dinner. At about 7:15, Lamp Trimmer Samuel Hemming arrived on the bridge and reported to Murdoch that all the lights had been set for the evening. Murdoch told him to get "the fore-scuttle hatch closed, there is a glow left from that, as we are in the vicinity of ice, and I want everything dark before the bridge." Murdoch was keenly aware that ice was near, and he was being particularly careful to ensure that nothing interfered with the night vision of the lookouts and officers. Lightoller returned from dinner to resume his watch. Murdoch remarked to him that the temperature had dropped another four degrees. Murdoch departed the bridge, and later relieved Lightoller at 10:00 p.m. Lightoller conveyed to Murdoch the ship's course and the ice field that they were approaching, and that they expected to be in the vicinity of the ice somewhere around 11:00. Lightoller wished Murdoch "joy of his Watch" and departed the bridge.

At approximately 11:39 pm on 14 April 1912, First Officer Murdoch was in charge when a large iceberg was sighted directly in the Titanic's path. Lookout Frederick Fleet rang the warning bell three times. It is likely that Murdoch had already seen the iceberg, and as soon as Officer Moody relayed Fleet's warning, "Iceberg right ahead!", Murdoch "rushed" from the bridge wing to the bridge. Quartermaster Robert Hichens, who was at the helm, and Fourth Officer Joseph Boxhall, who had heard the warning bell and had come from the officers' quarters behind the bridge, heard Murdoch's order to turn the helm "Hard-a-starboard", a tiller command which would turn the ship to port (left) by moving the tiller to starboard (right). At the time, steering instructions on British ships generally followed the way tillers on sailing vessels are operated, with turns in the opposite direction from the commands. As Walter Lord noted in The Night Lives On, this did not fully change to the "steering wheel" system of commands in the same directions as turns until 1924. This has led to rumours that Murdoch's orders were misinterpreted by the helmsman, resulting in a turn the wrong way.

Fourth Officer Boxhall testified that Murdoch set the ship's telegraph to "Full Astern", but Greaser Frederick Scott and Leading Stoker Frederick Barrett testified that the stoking indicators went from "Full" to "Stop". During or immediately before the collision, Quartermaster Alfred Olliver (who was walking on to the bridge during the collision) testified that he heard Murdoch give the order "Hard a'port"—moving the tiller all the way to the port (left) side, thus turning the ship to starboard (right)—in what may have been an attempt to swing the aft section of the ship away from the iceberg in a manoeuvre called a "port around" (this could explain his comment to the captain "I intended to port around it"). The fact that this manoeuvre was executed was supported by other crew members who testified that the stern of the ship never hit the iceberg. The orders that Murdoch gave to avoid the iceberg are debated. According to Oliver, Murdoch ordered the helm "hard to port" to ward off the stern of the iceberg. Hichens and Boxhall made no mention of the order. However, since the stern avoided the iceberg, it is likely that the order was given and carried out.

Despite these efforts, the ship made its fatal collision about 37 seconds after the iceberg had been sighted, opening the first six compartments. After the collision, Murdoch raced towards the watertight door controls, in the open bridge, and signalled the alarm below. Murdoch then told Quartermaster Olliver to "take the time", and told one of the junior officers to "make a note" in the logbook. Captain Smith came on to the bridge, asking Murdoch, "What have we struck?" Murdoch told him what happened and affirmed that the watertight doors were shut and the warning bell had rung. Smith, Murdoch, and Boxhall walked out on to the starboard bridge wing trying to spot the iceberg.

Murdoch was later put in charge of the starboard evacuation, during which he launched 10 lifeboats. Seaman Buley remembered an order from Murdoch for the "seamen to get together and uncover the boats and turn them out as quietly as though nothing had happened". Pitman joined Murdoch in helping and was ordered to start working on Boat No. 5. Murdoch was hard at work on Boat No. 7, along with assistance from Fifth Officer Harold Lowe; when lookout George Hogg worked with him, Murdoch told him to step into the boat. Murdoch ordered Steward Etches to get into Boat No. 5 and assist the men with the forward fall. He told Pitman to take charge of boat No. 5, shaking his hand and said, "Goodbye, good luck to you." Pitman, who at that time did not expect the ship to sink, later felt that Murdoch had not expected to see him again.

Lightoller later recalled that Wilde had apparently talked to Murdoch about where the firearms were, but Murdoch had no clue where they were, due to the re-shuffling of senior officers at Southampton. Lightoller led Wilde, Smith and Murdoch to the cabin, where he brought out the box of revolvers. Murdoch placed able-bodied seaman George Moore in charge of Boat. No. 3. Along with Lowe, Murdoch began working at Emergency Boat #1, where the pair allowed Sir Cosmo Duff-Gordon; his wife Lucy, Lady Duff-Gordon; her secretary, Mabel Francatelli; Abraham Salomon; and C. E. Henry Stengel to get in; with a lack of passengers around the emergency cutter, Murdoch gave the order to lower the boat which would later be a topic of controversy. At Boat No. 9, Murdoch, a number of stewards and other members of the victualling department were passing women and children over from the port side to fill up the boat. He fired warning shots at Collapsible C during the loading process in order to prevent a group of men swarming the Collapsible. Murdoch perished in the disaster and his body was never recovered.

== Controversy around death ==
In the immediate aftermath of the Titanic disaster, there were numerous stories and rumours about suicides in the press and amongst survivors, one of which was that one of the officers who perished in the sinking had killed himself. Amongst the named candidates were Captain Edward Smith, Chief Officer Henry Wilde, and First Officer Murdoch.

In the 1996 miniseries Titanic and the 1997 film Titanic, an officer's suicide was portrayed, both portraying Murdoch as the victim despite the fact that there is no reliable source naming Murdoch as such. The 1997 film also shows Murdoch taking a bribe, of which there is no evidence. When Murdoch's nephew Scott saw the 1997 film, he objected to the portrayal as damaging to Murdoch's heroic reputation. Film executives later flew to Murdoch's hometown to apologize, while director James Cameron said that the depiction was not meant to be negative but to show his "character and heroism."

=== Survivor accounts ===
At least two eyewitnesses, third-class passenger Eugene Daly and first-class passenger George Rheims, claimed to have seen an officer shoot one or two men during a rush for a lifeboat, then shoot himself. It was rumoured that Murdoch was the officer, though neither identified Murdoch by name. Though it is noted that Rheims later admitted under oath that he had lost his memory and could not recall many of the events, and that it was likely that both men were describing events at Boat D as it was being loaded and launched, during which time Murdoch was not present.

In a letter to Murdoch's widow, Second Officer Lightoller denied the rumours, writing that he saw Murdoch working on the falls to Collapsible A when he was swept overboard when the ship began her final plunge. However, Lightoller's testimony at the U.S. inquiry suggests that he was not in a position to witness Murdoch being swept overboard. It is also possible that Lightoller may have wanted to conceal the suicide, if one occurred, from Murdoch's widow. Later in life, a family friend claimed that Lightoller reportedly admitted that someone did die by suicide in the disaster. A claim was also made by James O. McGiffin, son of Captain James McGiffin who was a close personal friend of Murdoch's. He said that Lightoller had told his father that Murdoch had shot a man.

Tad Fitch and Bill Wormstedt note in their analysis of accounts by several survivors about a supposed suicide, including that of Daly and Rheims, that "much of the 'evidence' of an officer committing suicide is of dubious nature. Many of the survivor accounts disagree with each other, and some of the survivors probably would not have been in a position, either on the ship or close enough to it, to see what stories run in the newspapers quoted them as saying. Further complicating matters, many accounts of an officer's suicide were fabricated by reporters or were later denied by the people to whom they were attributed."

Some Titanic researchers have theorized that nobody shot anyone or committed suicide, but that when Titanic's forward funnel fell, the wire stays supporting it snapped. This might have sounded like gunshots which may have fooled nearby witnesses into believing that there were gunshots. Another theory put forward is that witnesses likely saw or heard warning shots fired by Fifth Officer Harold Lowe as Boat No. 14 was being lowered. Fitch and Wormstedt further theorise that the shots near Boat A, if there were any, were likely warning shots as several survivors from that area stated that there was a "mass of humanity" trying to rush the boat as crew were trying to launch it. They concluded:

Did an officer shoot men before committing suicide in the final stages of Titanic's sinking? If so, what was the identity of this officer? Unless more eyewitness information is uncovered and made public, the matter is unlikely to be settled with finality. As of this writing, there simply is not enough hard, factual, reliable data available to make any concrete determinations about the incident, much less about who may have been involved.

== Personal life ==
In 1903, Murdoch met a 29-year-old New Zealand school teacher named Ada Florence Banks en route to England on either the Runic or the Medic. They began to correspond regularly. On 2 September 1907 they were wed in Southampton at St Denys Church. The marriage register entry was witnessed by Captain William James Hannah and his wife, and the addresses given by the bride and groom suggest they were lodging with the Hannahs. Captain Hannah came from a family of seafarers with roots in Kircudbrightshire like Murdoch, and was Assistant Marine Superintendent for the White Star Line at Southampton.

Hannah saw Murdoch for the last time when he witnessed the testing of lifeboats before Titanic departed from Southampton on 10 April 1912.

== Legacy ==
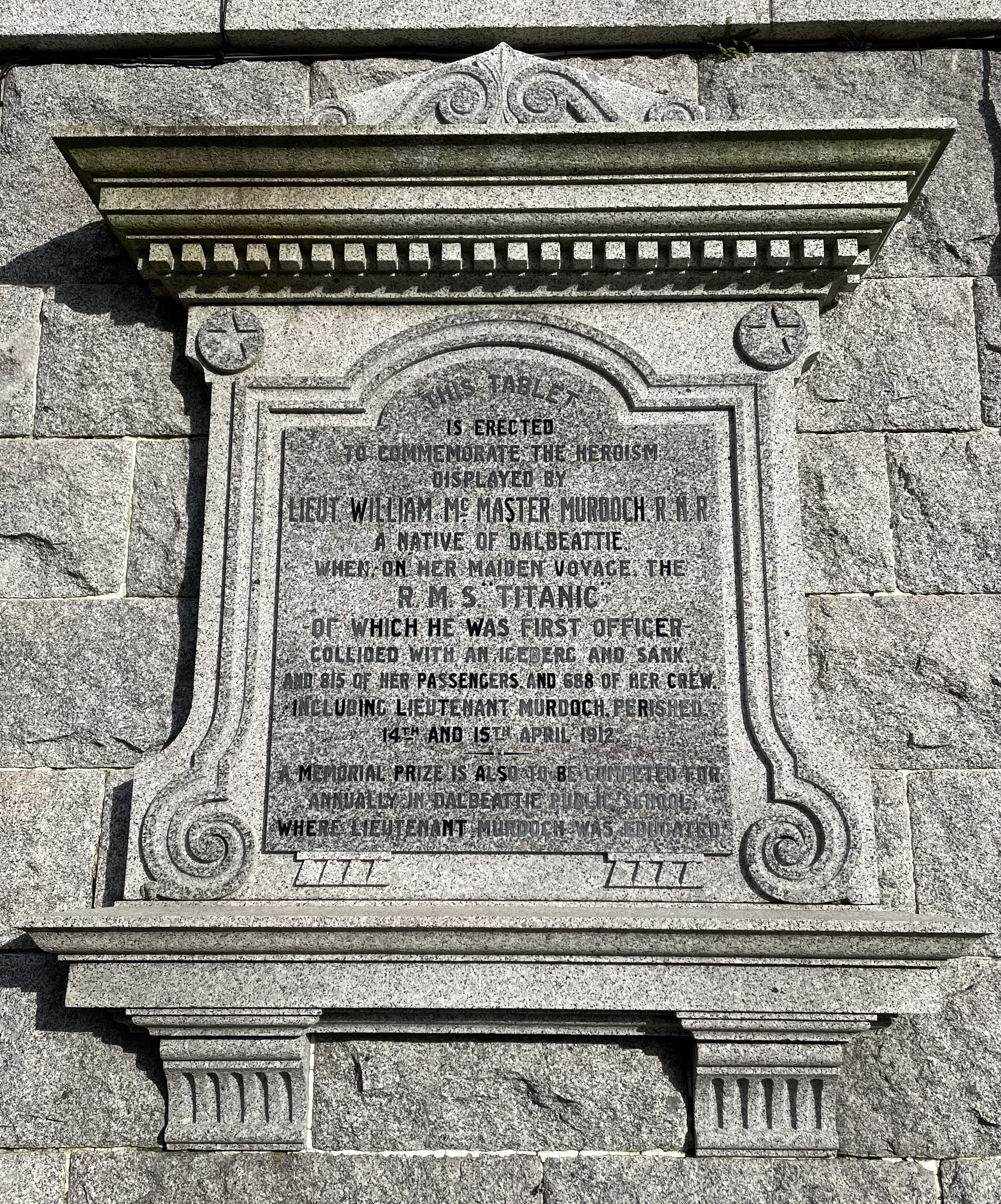
The memorial to William Murdoch on the wall of Dalbeattie Town Hall

Shortly after the sinking of the Titanic, The New York Herald published a story about Rigel, a dog reportedly owned by Murdoch who saved some of the survivors from the sinking. While the story was widely reproduced, contemporary analyses cast doubt on whether the dog actually existed.

In Murdoch's hometown of Dalbeattie, a memorial fund was created for the high school. Residents of the town objected to the depiction of Murdoch in the 1997 film Titanic and requested an apology. In April 1998, representatives from the film studio Twentieth Century Fox presented a £5,000 cheque for the memorial fund, but did not offer a formal apology. The film's director, James Cameron, said that his depiction of Murdoch was not meant to be negative. In 2004, he tentatively said that "it was probably a mistake" to portray a specific person and could understand the family's objections.

In April 2012, Premier Exhibitions announced that it had identified Murdoch's belongings from a previous expedition to the wreck of the Titanic in 2000. There was a toiletry kit with Murdoch's initials embossed on it, a spare White Star Line officer's button, a straight razor, a shoe brush, a smoking pipe, and a pair of long johns. The items were recovered by David Concannon, Ralph White and Anatoly Sagalevitch, diving in the Russian submersible Mir 1 in July 2000.

== Portrayals ==
- Ernst Rückert (1912) — In Nacht und Eis
- Theo Shall (1943) — Titanic
- Barry Bernard (1953) — Titanic
- Mike McHale (1955) — You Are There: The Sinking of the Titanic (TV episode, 22 May 1955)
- Robert Brown (1956) — A Night to Remember (Kraft Television Theatre)
- Richard Leech (1958) — A Night to Remember
- Paul Young (1979) — S.O.S. Titanic (TV Movie)
- Malcolm Stewart (1996) — Titanic (TV Miniseries)
- David Costabile (1997) — Titanic (Broadway Musical)
- Ewan Stewart (1997) — Titanic
- Courtenay Pace (1998) — Titanic: Secrets Revealed (TV Documentary)
- Charlie Arneson (2003) — Ghosts of the Abyss (Documentary)
- Ewan Stewart (2005) — Last Mysteries of the Titanic (Documentary)
- Noel Burton (2008) — The Unsinkable Titanic (Documentary)
- Brian McCardie (2012) — Titanic (TV series/4 episodes)
- Josh Bower (2017) - Titanic: Sinking the Myths (Documentary)
