= Henry Tingle Wilde =

Chief Officer of RMS Titanic (1872–1912)

Lieutenant Henry Tingle Wilde RNR
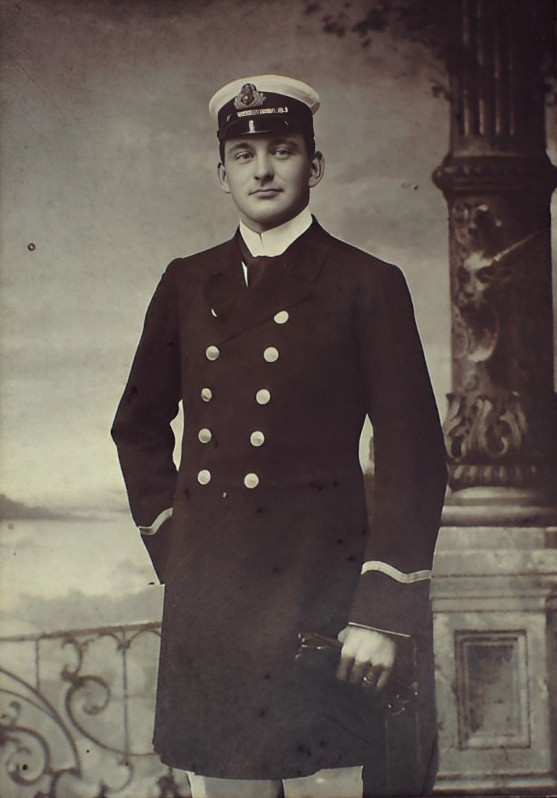
- Studio photo of Wilde, c. 1900
- Born: 21 September 1872; Walton, Lancashire, England
- Died: 15 April 1912 (aged 39); North Atlantic Ocean
- Occupations: Merchant seaman; Naval officer
- Known for: Chief Officer aboard the RMS Titanic
- Spouse: Mary Catherine Jones (m. 1898; died 1910)
- Children: 6
- Military career
- Allegiance: United Kingdom
- Branch: Royal Naval Reserve
- Rank: Lieutenant

Lieutenant Henry Tingle Wilde RNR (21 September 1872 – 15 April 1912) was a British Merchant Navy officer who was the chief officer of the RMS Titanic during her ill-fated maiden voyage. Wilde died during the sinking, alongside 1,500 others.

== Early life ==
Henry Tingle Wilde was born on 21 September 1872 in Walton, north of Liverpool, England. He was the son of Henry Wilde, an insurance surveyor from Ecclesfield, South Yorkshire. His mother was Elizabeth Tingle of Loxley, Bradfield. Wilde was christened at the Loxley Congregational Chapel in Loxley, Sheffield on 24 October 1872.

== Maritime career beginnings ==
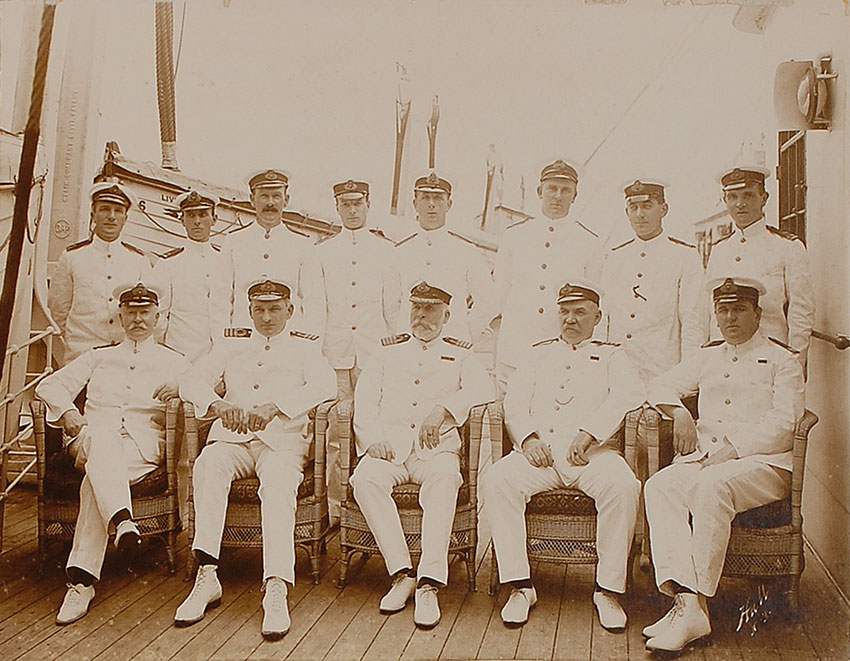
Officers of RMS Olympic with Captain Edward Smith (seated centre); Chief Officer Wilde is seated second from left. Also photographed are First Officer William Murdoch (standing far right) and Chief Purser Hugh McElroy (sitting far right)

Wilde began his career at sea in his teens. He apprenticed with Messrs. James Chambers & Co., Liverpool. His apprenticeship began on 23 October 1889, on board the 1,835-ton Greystoke Castle and concluded four years later on 22 October 1893. From there, he served as third mate aboard Greystoke Castle and then moved on to third mate of the 1,374-ton Hornsby Castle.

Wilde made the transition from sail to steam in 1895, serving aboard the SS Brunswick in 1895, where he served initially as third mate, then as second mate. In 1896, he transferred to the SS Europa and served aboard her as second mate, likely with the Elder Dempster Line.

In July 1897, Wilde joined the White Star Line. Starting as a junior officer, Wilde rose steadily through the ranks while serving on several White Star ships. These included the SS Cevic, SS Cufic, SS Tauric, and SS Delphic. He also saw service on White Star Line's new Big Four ships: RMS Celtic, RMS Cedric, RMS Baltic, and RMS Adriatic.

Outside the New York route, Wilde also made his only Australian runs aboard the SS Medic and SS Persic, and served as Chief Officer of the SS Laurentic, the first White Star ship on the Canada run. He also served aboard the SS Cymric and SS Canopic on their Mediterranean routes; on the Canopic, he served under Captain Inman Sealby who, soon after, became the last captain of the RMS Republic.

According to recently discovered Royal Navy and White Star Line records, it was confirmed that Wilde served as captain of the SS Zeeland on the Liverpool-Boston route from 7 April to 5 May 1911. His tenure as captain was short-lived, however, as he returned to the rank of Chief Officer of the RMS Teutonic in mid-May before being transferred to the Cedric a few weeks afterwards.

In August 1911, Wilde became Chief Officer of the RMS Olympic, replacing Joseph Evans who had been Chief during its maiden voyage. There, he served under Titanic's future captain, Edward J. Smith, and alongside William Murdoch, who was First Officer. He was on board when the Olympic collided with HMS Hawke on its fifth voyage and later took part in the inquiries of the collision.

Wilde was an officer of the Royal Naval Reserve, where he was commissioned a sub-lieutenant on 26 June 1902. On 12 June 1905, he was promoted to Lieutenant.

== Titanic ==
=== Officers reshuffle ===
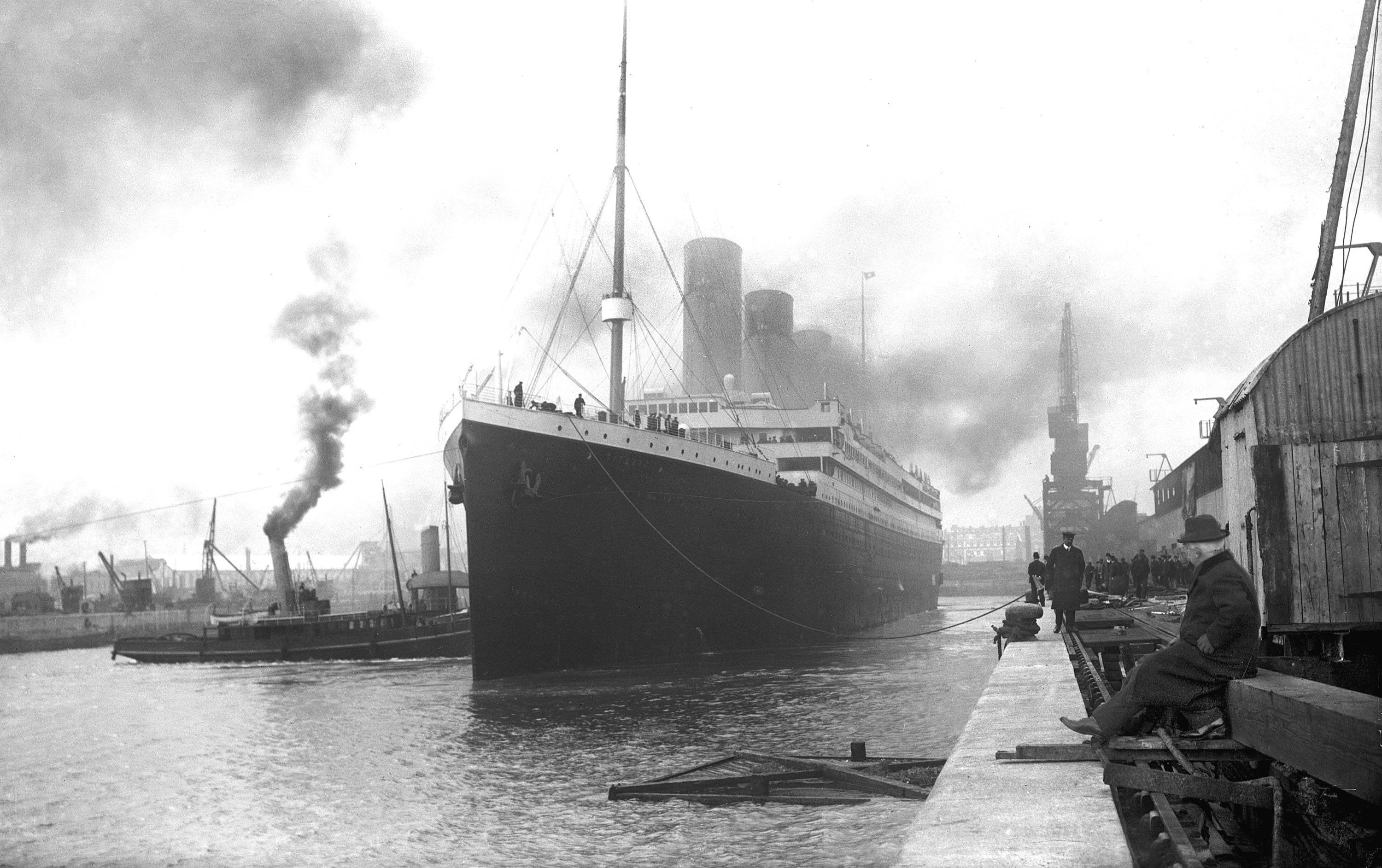
Titanic at Southampton docks, prior to departure. Wilde is on the forecastle, just to the right of the anchor crane, with his hands clasped behind his back.

Wilde was assigned to the Titanic as her chief officer in a reshuffle on board; this caused the lowering of a rank of William Murdoch and Charles Lightoller to First and Second Officer, respectively, with Second Officer David Blair being removed from the ship entirely. Almost as soon as the ship had tied up in Southampton, Wilde had been kept ashore when the Olympic departed Southampton on 3 April, and was assigned to make the Titanic voyage. Lightoller later recalled that Wilde had stayed ashore because he was to receive "command of another of the White Star steamers, which, owing to the coal strike and other reasons was laid up." Wilde was ready and willing to serve, although he was reportedly a bit apprehensive about the switch to Titanic; he had been hesitant to accept the appointment until his friends told him that he would be "mad to refuse" the opportunity, so he had accepted the posting. Lightoller called Wilde "a pretty big, powerful chap, and he was a man that would not argue very long." Wilde did not formally join the ship until the evening of 9 April.

On the ship's sailing day, 10 April 1912, Wilde mustered with the crew, and afterwards participated in the ship's lifeboat drill. The officers made their way to their departure stations; Wilde was at the head of the forecastle, overseeing the crew working the mooring lines. Around the time of departure, he was overseeing in casting off mooring ropes and in securing of tug lines. Wilde stood by the anchor crane at the bow, his hands clasped behind his back, watching the crewmen kneeling on the deck next to him, coiling the lines neatly for storage. After the ship was put to sea, Wilde worked the 2:00–6:00 watches every morning and afternoon. On 11 April Third Class Steward John E. Hart recalled that at some point during the day, there was a general bulkhead inspection. He saw Wilde and designer Thomas Andrews checking to make sure that the crew would close the watertight doors manually.

=== Sinking ===
On 14 April Wilde was relieved of Officer of the Watch at 6pm by Lightoller. At 11:40 p.m., on 14 April, the ship hit an iceberg. After the collision with the iceberg, Lamp trimmer Samuel Hemming headed up to the forecastle head, just forward of the anchor crane, to investigate air hissing out of the vent pipe with considerable force, indicating the peak tank was flooding rapidly. Wilde came along shortly afterwards and asked Hemming about the hissing noise to which Hemming said water must be flooding the forepeak tank but that the storeroom was dry. Wilde proceeded on his way. Haines later informed Wilde on the bridge that No. 1 hold was flooding. Wilde told him to get his men up, and then to get the boats out.

It is likely that Wilde may have been the one who ordered Fourth Officer Joseph Boxhall to wake up the off-duty officers. On the port side, Wilde took charge of the boats and Lightoller would assist him. He met Wilde just outside the door to the officers' quarters and Wilde ordered him to get the covers off the boats. He asked if all hands had been called, and Wilde replied in the affirmative. Lightoller asked Wilde if they could swing the boats out, but Wilde did not seem to want to just yet. When Lightoller ran to Smith who gave him permission.

In the ensuing evacuation, Wilde helped in the loading of Lifeboats No. 8, 14, 12, 16, 2, and 10. While working at the port side lifeboats, Lightoller was approached by Wilde from the starboard side and asked where the firearms were. He had apparently asked Murdoch, but the First Officer had no idea where they were. When the revolvers were brought out, and Lightoller turned to leave, Wilde shoved one revolver into his hand, with a handful of ammunition, saying he may need it. As they left the cabin, Lightoller heard Wilde say "I am going to put on my life-belt." By 1:40 a.m., most of the port lifeboats had been lowered, and Wilde moved to the starboard side. Steward James Johnston and Fourth Officer Boxhall saw Wilde putting women and children into lifeboat No. 2 and superintending the filling. At 10, chief baker Charles Joughin saw Wilde conducting affairs, shouting at the stewards to keep a large number of passengers gathered back. When the boat was full, Wilde then picked out the men to take charge of it: two sailors and a steward. Ismay testified that Wilde was the officer who was in charge of collapsible C.

Major Arthur Peuchen, a first-class Canadian passenger, had just reached the boat deck and saw a group of about 100 stokers with their kit bags, seemingly crowding the whole deck in front of the boats; unlike many of the passengers, these men had come up from below and knew the extent of the flooding. An officer, who may have been Wilde, came along and drove the men out of the area. The stokers did not protest and cooperated with the officer. Boat No. 8, loaded by Wilde, was to get away first. Wilde ordered able bodied seaman Joseph Scarrott to start loading women and children into Boat No. 14. At No. 12, he asked seaman Clench how many crewmen were aboard. When told there was just one, he ordered him into the boat as there were no other seamen available and ordered him to keep his eye on lifeboat No. 14 where Fifth Officer Harold Lowe had taken charge. He began loading boat No. 2 and once away, he crossed over to the starboard side to Collapsible C. He helped load passengers, then put out a call for someone to look after the boat; Quartermaster George Rowe was ordered by Smith to do so. Wilde left C and returned to the port side, most likely by passing through the bridge and began loading Boat D. When steerage passengers began rushing, Wilde pulled his gun and ordered every man to get out of the boat. He then ordered, along with Lightoller for all passengers to the starboard side to straighten the ship up. At D, Wilde told Lightoller, "You go with her, Lightoller." Lightoller said, "Not damned likely!", and jumped back on the ship in defiance of Wilde's order. This was the last reliable sighting of Wilde.

=== Death ===
An account in the Cornish Post of 2 May 1912, claimed that Wilde was last seen on the bridge smoking a cigarette, and that he waved goodbye to Lightoller as the ship sank. Lightoller himself made no mention of this, in his accounts, only allowing he last saw Wilde "quite a long time" before the ship went down. His body, if recovered, was never identified.

== Personal life ==
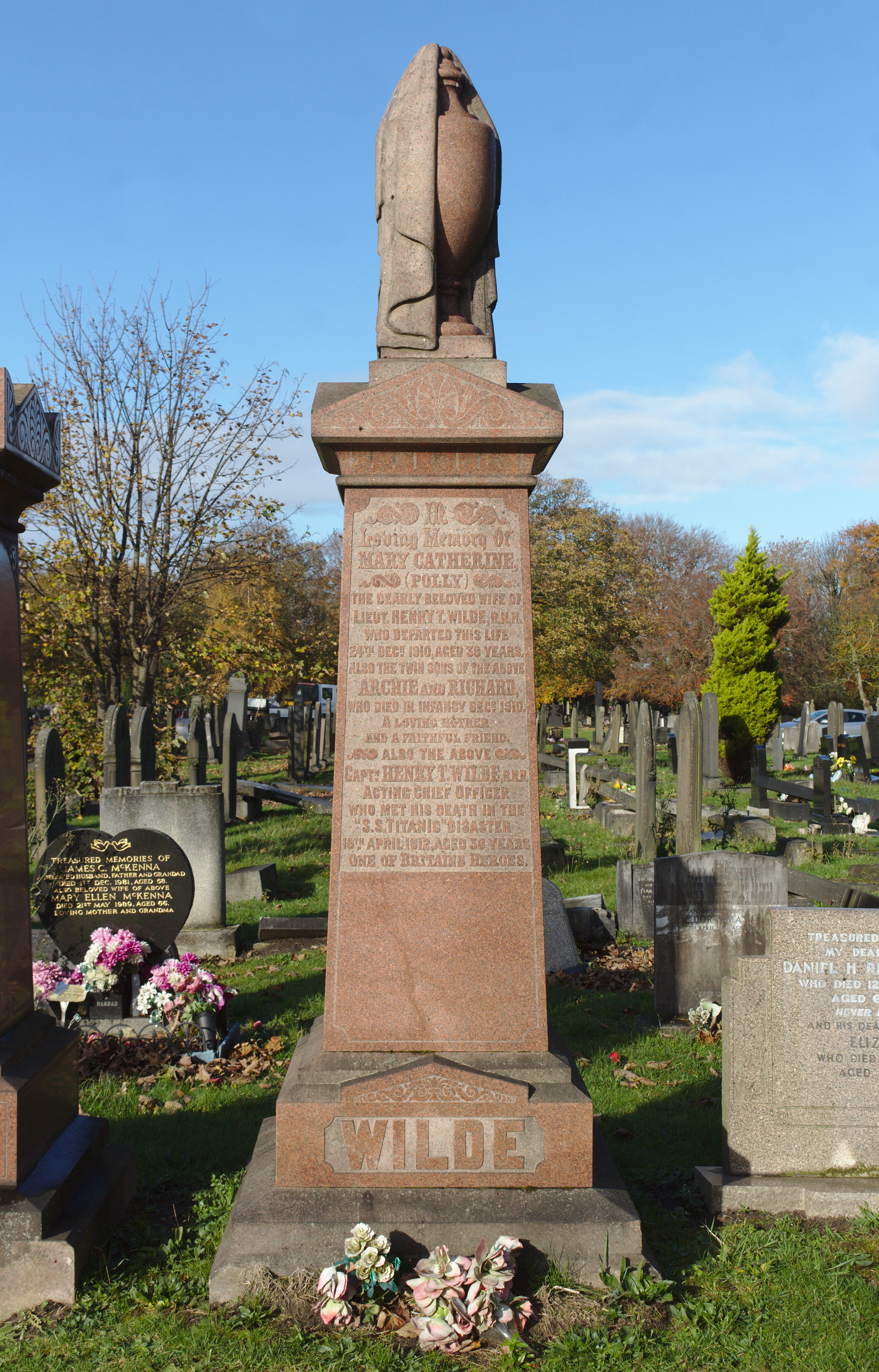
Grave of Wilde's wife Mary, with inscription recording Wilde's death

Wilde married Mary Catherine Jones (known as "Pollie" or "Polly"), who lived down the street from him, in August 1898. She was of Welsh descent and Wilde, who was christened Anglican, married her at the Welsh Calvinist Methodish Chapel in Liverpool.

The couple had four children who survived into adulthood: Jane Elizabeth (known as "Jenny"), Henry Owen (known as "Harry"), George Arnold, and Nancy Annie. Tragedy struck in December 1910 when Wilde's wife and twin infant sons Archie and Richard died. He was left supporting four children and had some difficulty overcoming the loss.

Letters from Wilde after the loss of his wife show that he suffered from depression, on one occasion writing to his sister-in-law: "I don't seem to have anything to live for if it was not for the children. I would not care what happened to me." In January 1911, he wrote a new will which, in the event of his death, would leave his surviving children in care of his late wife's siblings.

As his body was not recovered, Wilde's name is recorded on his wife's tombstone at Kirkdale Cemetery in Liverpool, marked by an obelisk and gravestone. The inscription reads, "Also Capt. Henry T. Wilde, RNR Acting Chief Officer Who Met His Death in the SS Titanic Disaster 15th April 1912 aged 38 years [sic]. 'One of Britain's Heroes'".

In 2012, Wilde's grandson, Chris Bayliss, revealed that the family had numerous letters, photographs, documents related to Wilde which were discovered in the family's home and had never been publicly released before.

== Portrayals ==
- Charles B. Fitzsimons (1953) (Titanic)
- Howard Lang (1958) (A Night to Remember)
- Tony Caunter (1979) (S.O.S. Titanic)
- Mark Lindsay Chapman (1997) (Titanic)
- Will Keen (2012) (Titanic) (TV series/4 episodes)
