= Dalbeattie High School =

Secondary school in Dumfries and Galloway, Scotland

Coordinates: 54.933°N 3.829°W

Dalbeattie High School is a small rural secondary school on the edge of Dalbeattie in the historical county of Kirkcudbrightshire in the local council area of Dumfries and Galloway in Scotland. The school has 304 pupils.

The original school was built between 1950 and 1958 by the Kirkcudbrightshire County architect Archibald Thomson Caldwell and has been replaced by a new build which was officially opened in August 2018. Combined with the relocated primary it forms the Dalbeattie Learning Campus.
