= Transport Medal =

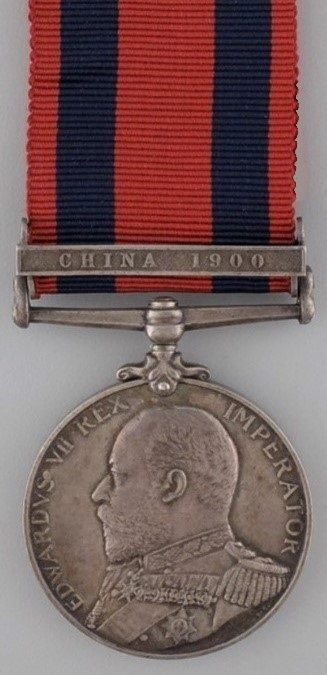
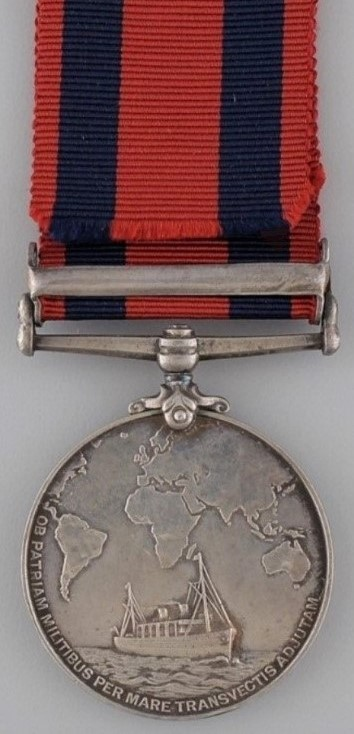
- Obverse and reverse of medal
- Type: Campaign medal
- Awarded for: Campaign service
- Description: Silver disk 36 mm wide
- Presented by: United Kingdom of Great Britain and Ireland
- Eligibility: Mercantile Marine officers
- Clasps: S.AFRICA 1899-1902; CHINA 1900
- Established: 1903
- Total: 1,719
- Ribbon: red with two blue stripes

The Transport Medal was a British campaign medal sanctioned on 8 November 1903 and awarded by the Lord Commissioners of the Admiralty. It was awarded to masters and officers (Note: Specifically, Masters, First, Second and Third Officers, First, Second and Third Engineers, Pursers and Surgeons.) of merchant ships employed by the Transport Service to move troops to either South Africa during the South African War or to China during the Boxer Rebellion. The officers of hospital ships also qualified.

It was intended that the medal would be awarded for any future campaign where a medal was issued to the troops taking part, but it was not awarded again after the South Africa and China wars.

The medal, 1.4 inches (36 mm) in diameter, is silver and has a plain straight swivel suspender. The obverse bears the head of King Edward VII in Royal Navy uniform, with the inscription EDWARDVS VII REX IMPERATOR.
The reverse depicts HMS Ophir beneath a map of the world with, below, the words in Latin OB PATRIAM MILITIBUS PER MARE TRANSVECTIS ADJUTAM which translates as for services rendered in transporting troops by sea.
The recipient's name, although not his rank or ship, is impressed in block capitals on the rim of the medal. However for those who were ship masters the notation "IN COMMAND" was added after their names.
The 1.25 inches (32 mm) wide ribbon is red, with a blue stripe towards each edge.

== Clasps ==
S.AFRICA 1899–1902
For services related to the South African War, 13 September 1899 – 31 October 1902.
CHINA 1900
For services related to the Boxer Rebellion, 1 June 1900 – 31 December 1901.

The officers of 117 transports and eleven hospital ships qualified, with a total of 1,719 medals awarded: 1,219 with the 'S. Africa 1899-1902' clasp, 322 with the 'China 1900' clasp and 178 with both clasps. (Note: Precise award figures vary slightly. For example, Edward Joslin states 1,270 S. Africa, 323 China and 188 two clasp medals, while Robert J. Paterson notes a total of 1,810 medals and 180 ships.)

== See also ==
- Mercantile Marine Medal
