= Titanic Collapsible Boat D =

Lifeboat from the RMS Titanic

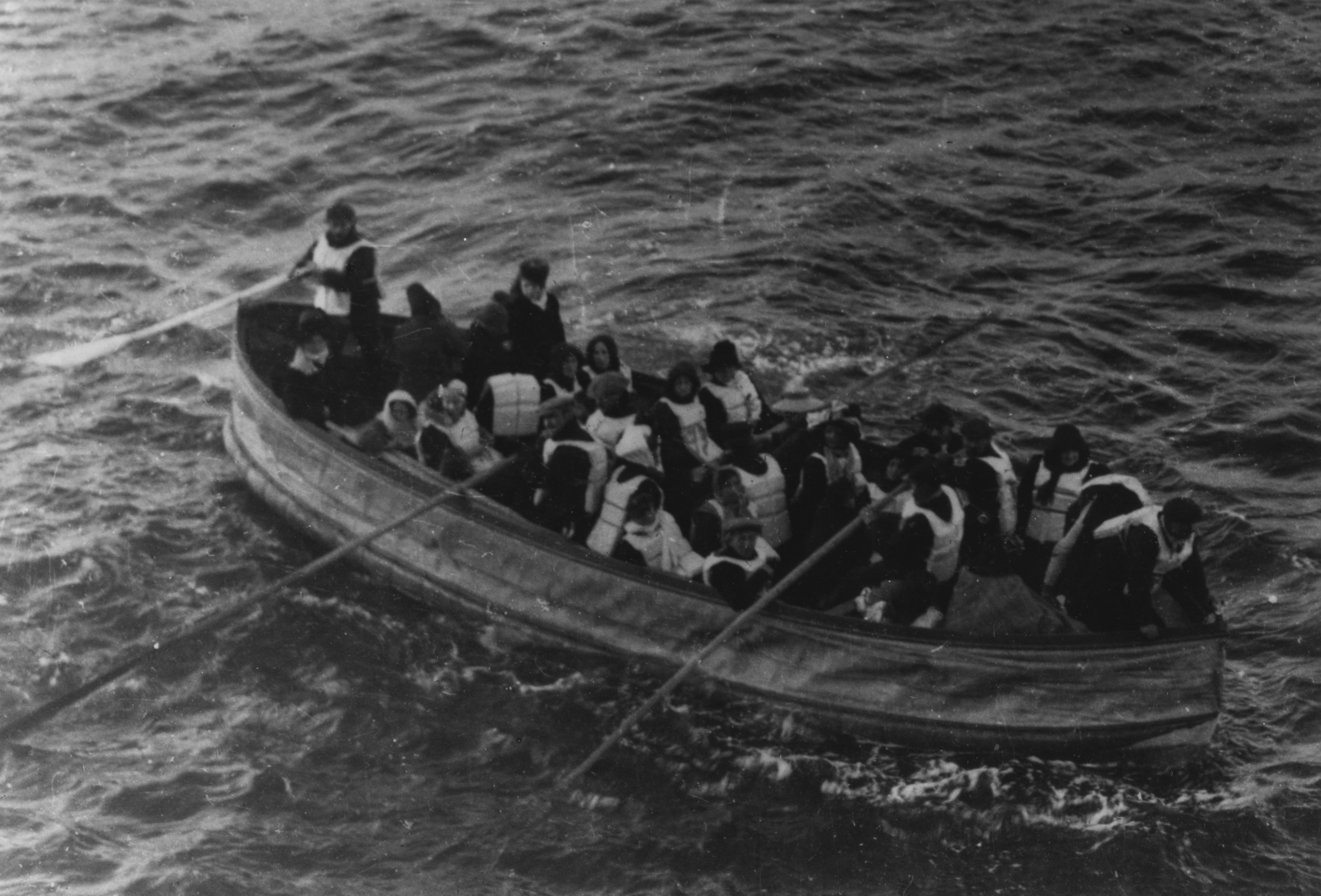
The Titanic's Collapsible Lifeboat D approaches RMS Carpathia at 7:15 a.m. on 15 April 1912.

Collapsible Boat D was a lifeboat from the Titanic. It was one of the last boats launched to sea, over two and a half hours after the Titanic collided with an iceberg and began sinking on 14 April 1912. Collapsible D was the last lifeboat to be successfully launched from the port side around 2.05 am, and the last lifeboat to be successfully launched from Titanic overall. It held amongst others the two Titanic orphans and First-Class passengers Hugh Woolner and Mauritz Björnström-Steffansson. About 30 to 35 people occupied the Collapsible when they were rescued by RMS Carpathia at 7:15 am.

== Description ==
Collapsible Boat D was located on the port side of the ship and was one of the four "collapsible" Engelhardt lifeboats. They were boat-shaped unsinkable rafts made of kapok and cork, with heavy canvas sides that were raised to form a boat. These "collapsible" boats measured 27 ft 5 in (8.36 m) long and 8 ft (2.4 m) wide by 3 ft (0.91 m) deep. Their capacities were of 376.6 cubic feet (10.66 m^{3}) and each could carry 47 people. Inspired in a Danish design, they were built by McAlister & Son of Dumbarton, Scotland. Their equipment was similar to that of the cutters, but they had no mast or sail, had eight oars apiece and were steered using a steering oar rather than a rudder.

Collapsible D was one of two Collapsible Boats that were successfully launched between 2.00 and 2.15 am, with only one from each side of the ship getting safely to sea. Collapsible Boat C (starboard) was launched at 2.00 am with about 44 people on board under the command of Quartermaster George Rowe. Collapsible Boat D (port) was also successful in its launching at 2.05 am, carrying about 20 people, and under the command of Quartermaster Arthur Bright.

The two other collapsibles were located on top of the Officer's Quarters and needed to be pushed off to be launched. While Collapsible A was brought down upright, Collapsible B fell over upside down. Both boats were not launched but were washed away as the water began reaching the bridge. Collapsible B floated off upside down and would eventually be taken charge off by Second Officer Charles Lightoller. It had around 23 survivors when assisted by other lifeboats, including Wireless Operator Harold Bride, Chief Baker Charles Joughin and First-Class passengers Archibald Gracie IV and Jack Thayer. Collapsible A floated away right side up and had no crewmember in charge of it as Officers James Moody, William Murdoch, and Henry Wilde, handling the launch of A, were swept away after a surge of water from the staircase leading below decks. It had around 14 survivors when assisted by other lifeboats, including First-Class passenger R. Norris Williams and Third-Class passenger Rhoda Abbott.

== History ==
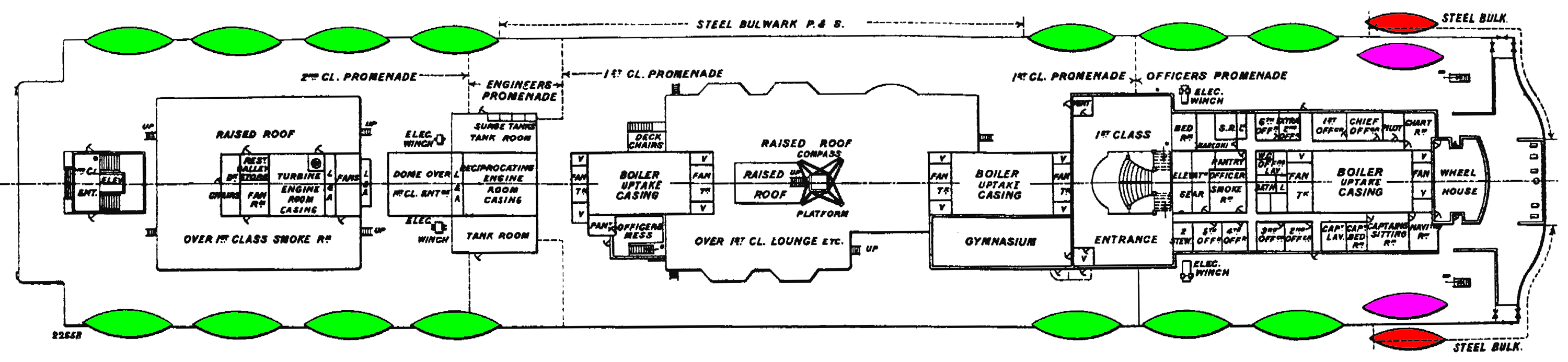
A plan of RMS Titanic's boat deck, with Collapsible D being shown in purple at the top right.

Collapsible Boat D was located on deck next to the swung out Emergency Lifeboat No. 2. And on 15 April 1912, after Lifeboat No. 2 had been launched at 1:45 am, Collapsible D was retrieved from its stored position on the boat deck and had her canvas sides erected before it was attached to the davits and swung out over the side by 1:50 am. The only thing missing on the Collapsible, seemed to be the bottom plug, which Second Officer Charles Lightoller and Able Seaman William Lucas tried to look for until giving up the search. Chief Officer Henry Wilde and Second Officer Charles Lightoller oversaw the loading of the lifeboat and only allowed women and children to board the Collapsible. However, Second Officer Lightoller experienced great difficulty in finding any women to fill the boat with. The second officer called out for more women to step forward, to which the many men on deck replied that there were no more and began to board the lifeboat themselves. Just as the men began to enter the Collapsible, a man on deck shouted that there were more women nearby. As the few women arrived at the Collapsible, all the men disembarked it and returned to the boat deck while the women were helped on board. This event occurred again and perhaps even once more as more women began to trickle into the Collapsible. Second-Class passenger Michel Navratil Sr. stepped forward and placed his two young sons into the Collapsible, however he himself was denied entry by Second Officer Lightoller despite the fact that the boys' father was their only guardian aboard Titanic. Mr. Navratil bid farewell to his children and stepped back, he did not survive the sinking. Meanwhile, First-Class passenger Archibald Gracie IV spotted fellow First-Class passengers Caroline Brown and Edith Corse Evans wandering around deck, and decided to escort them to Collapsible D as it was the last lifeboat left on the port side besides Collapsible B (which still lay stored on top of the Officers' Quarters). Caroline Brown entered the lifeboat while Edith Corse Evans did not, making Miss Brown the last passenger to enter a lifeboat from the davits. Why Miss Evans didn't board the Collapsible is not known, but it is assumed that she seemed to believe the Collapsible to be full and would simply await the launching of the last two Collapsibles. She was one of only four First-Class women to not survive the sinking. As Second Officer Lightoller had now filled the boat with about 15 to 20 women and children, he deemed the Collapsible to be filled enough as he doubted the stability of the lifeboat, because he deemed Collapsible boats to be frailer than the standard sized wooden lifeboats. He ordered in a few crewmen to help row the boat and put Quartermaster Arthur John Bright in command of the Collapsible. Second Officer Lightoller noticed that a few more people could possibly be seated in the Collapsible as there was still room left on it, but decided against it as he could not see any more women on deck and was concerned that the lifeboat would be rushed if he would allow the many men left on the boat deck to enter it. So with only 25 of her 47 seats filled, Collapsible D was launched at 2.05 am and would become the last lifeboat from the Titanic to be successfully lowered.

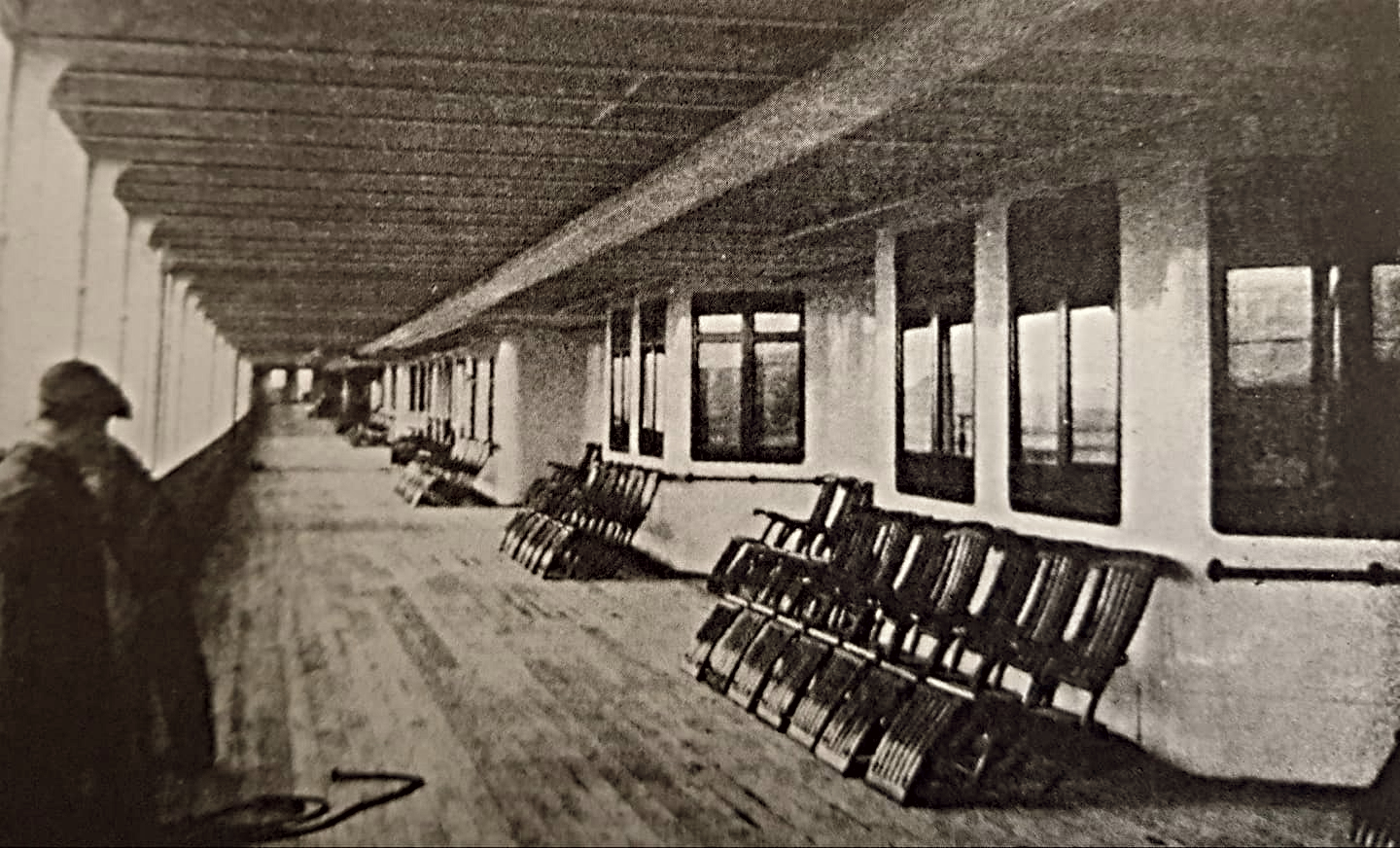
Titanic's A deck promenade from where Hugh Woolner and Mauritz Håkan Björnström-Steffansson would jump into Collapsible D.

Due to the Titanic having already sunken a significant amount since striking the iceberg, the Collapsible only had to be launched some ten feet (3 meters) before she reached the water. At the same time as Collapsible D was lowered, First-Class passengers Hugh Woolner and Mauritz Håkan Björnström-Steffansson found themselves all alone on the port side A deck promenade while it was already starting to flood and the lights were burning with a deep red colour. Just as the men got ready to jump overboard, they noticed Collapsible D being lowered only about nine feet (2.7 meters) away from them as Titanic had taken on a port list. The men could see that there was still an empty space at the bow of the Collapsible and decided to jump in it. Björnström-Steffansson leaped first and tumbled head over heels into the lifeboat, while Woolner hit the lifeboat's gunwale with his chest after jumping, leaving his legs dangling in the water. He proceeded to hook his right heel over the boat's gunwale before trying to pull himself aboard, being aided shortly after by Björnström-Steffansson. Another First-Class passenger named Frederick Maxfield Hoyt, who had shortly before helped his wife board Collapsible D, now also jumped off the Titanic's boat deck and swam towards the Collapsible, being hauled aboard by Woolner and Björnström-Steffansson. Following the launch of the Collapsible, it was quickly found out that the bottom plug was missing and a bit of water started entering the boat. The women in the Collapsible then removed their stockings to plug up the hole.

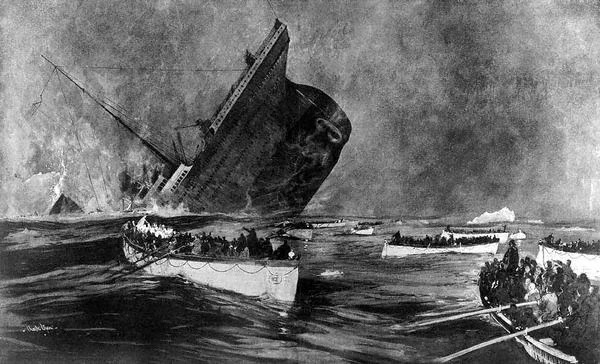
Titanic's final moments.

Quartermaster Arthur John Bright instructed his men to row away from the Titanic to avoid any suction as the ship went down. The Collapsible only made it about 150 yards (137 meters) away from Titanic when the ship entered its final plunge. Quartermaster Bright and Frederick Hoyt witnessed the Titanic breaking in half while Woolner only heard a continuous rumbling noise as he could barely see the Titanic after her lights gave out. Once the Titanic was gone, Quartermaster Bright decided to try and find any other lifeboats in the vicinity and row towards them. Collapsible D circled around as her crew had difficulty locating other lifeboats and after about 15 minutes, the crew could hear other boats and having gotten better night vision, were able to row towards them.

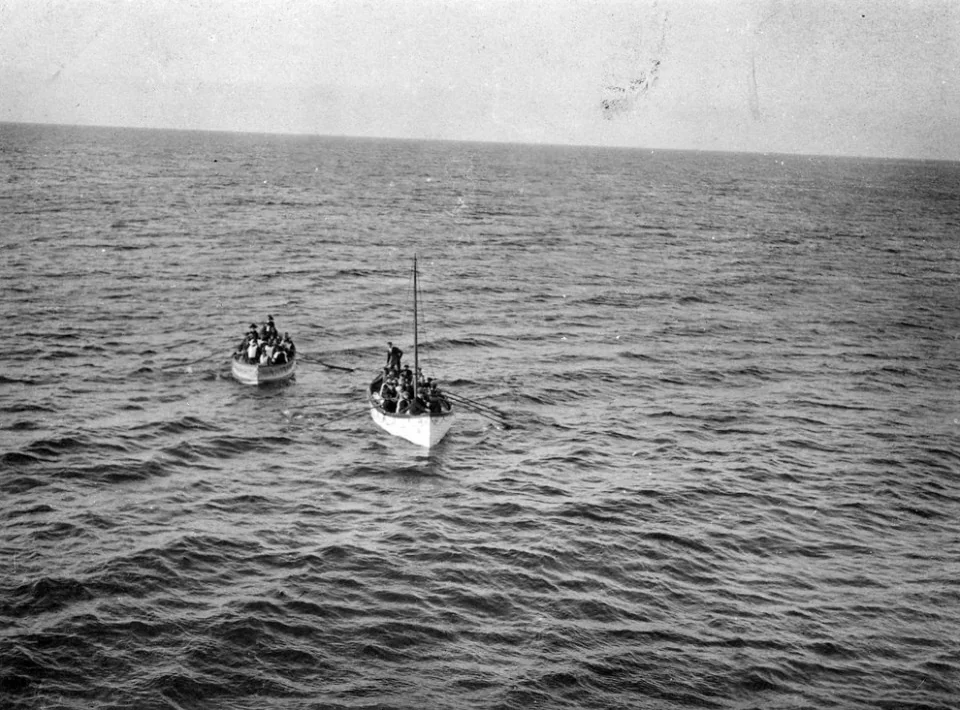
Lifeboat No. 14 towing Collapsible D towards the Carpathia with those rescued from Collapsible A.

Collapsible D joined Lifeboats No. 4, No. 10, No. 12 and No. 14 after which Fifth Officer Lowe of Lifeboat No. 14 ordered the boats to be tied up together by their painters, head and tail, so as to make the lifeboats more visible to any rescue ship and be able to stick together better. Fifth Officer Lowe then proceeded to order all the people of his lifeboat, to be distributed over the other boats so that he could go back in search of any survivors from the water. Fifth Officer Lowe asked how many occupants Collapsible D had, so steward John Hardy of the Collapsible's crew counted the people on board and relayed this information to Fifth Officer Lowe. The officer then proceeded to transfer 10 to 12 people from his lifeboat into the Collapsible while ordering one seaman to get out and join him in Lifeboat No. 14. Fifth Officer Lowe then left with a nearly empty lifeboat that only held himself and about seven crewmen in search of any survivors. The lifeboats then stayed together until daylight broke, and the rescue ship RMS Carpathia was spotted in the distance after they had already noticed the ship's lights and rockets during the night. The Carpathia however, came to a stop quite a distance away from the pack of lifeboats and so they untied each other and proceeded to row towards the steamer. As Collapsible D had trouble making headway due to the low amount of men it had to row the oars, Fifth Officer Lowe pulled up besides them in his lifeboat whereupon he had erected its sail. Fifth Officer Lowe offered to tow the Collapsible to the Carpathia, to which its crew agreed, and as the lifeboats sailed towards Carpathia, they spotted the waterlogged Collapsible Boat A with about 14 survivors still aboard it. They sailed towards it and rescued all the survivors, with Collapsible D taking on First-Class passenger R. Norris Williams and Third-Class passenger Rhoda Abbott. The Collapsible reached Carpathia at 7.15 am and a photograph that was taken of the lifeboat as it was approaching the Carpathia shows about 30 people aboard it. After all her occupants were safely aboard Carpathia, Collapsible D was set adrift alongside six other lifeboats of the Titanic as Carpathia didn't have the room to recover all 20 of Titanic's lifeboats. The lifeboat was never seen again.

== Occupants ==
This is a list of known passengers and crew who were saved by Collapsible D.

- First Class passenger
- Second Class passenger
- Third Class passenger
- Crew member

Name	Age	Class/Dept	Notes
Andersson, Miss Erna Alexandra	16	Third Class	Finnish woman who was emigrating to the United States to join her brother in New York City.
Backström, Mrs. Maria Mathilda (née Gustafsson)	33	Third Class	Finnish woman who was emigrating to the United States with her husband and two brothers. Her husband and brothers were lost in the sinking. She died in 1947.
Björnström-Steffansson, Mr. Mauritz Håkan	28	First Class	Swedish businessman who jumped into Collapsible D as it was being lowered. He filed a claim of $100,000 against the White Star Line for the loss of his painting, making it the most highly valued single item of luggage or cargo lost as a result of the sinking. He died in 1962.
Brown, Mrs. Caroline Lane (née Lamson)	59	First Class	American woman who became the last passenger to enter a lifeboat from the davits. She died in 1928.
Bright, Mr. Arthur John	42	Deck Crew	Quartermaster. Put in charge of the lifeboat; he was called on to testify at the American Inquiry into the sinking. He died in 1955.
Butrus-Youssef, Master Makhkhul	4	Third Class	Syrian boy who was returning to the United States with his mother and sister. He became separated from his mother during the evacuation and was put in Collapsible D by an unknown man while his family was saved in a different lifeboat. He died in 1991.
Driscoll, Miss Bridget	27	Third Class	Irish woman who was returning to the United States after having taken care of her dying mother in her native Ireland. She died in 1976.
Duquemin, Mr. Joseph Pierre	19	Third Class	Channel Islander mason who was emigrating to the United States. He was hauled into Collapsible D after jumping and swimming away from the rapidly foundering Titanic. He died in 1950.
Hardy, Mr. John	40	Victualling Crew	Chief Second Class Steward. Was called on to testify at the American Inquiry into the sinking. He died in 1953.
Harris, Mrs. Irene "Renee" (née Wallach)	35	First Class	American woman who lost her husband in the sinking and went on to become a successful producer. She died in 1969.
Hoyt, Mr. Frederick Maxfield	35	First Class	American yachtsman who jumped in the water shortly after Collapsible D's launch and was hauled aboard her. He died in 1940.
Hoyt, Mrs. Jane Anne (née Forby)	31	First Class	American woman whose husband Frederick Maxfield Hoyt helped her into the Collapsible before he jumped in the water and was hauled aboard Collapsible D. She died in 1932.
Jermyn, Miss Annie Jane	26	Third Class	Irish woman who was emigrating to the United States to join her sister in Massachusetts.
Kelly, Miss Mary	22	Third Class	Irish woman who was emigrating to the United States to join her fiancé in New York. She died in 1950.
Lucas, Mr. William Arthur	25	Deck Crew	Able Seaman. Was called on to testify at the British Inquiry into the sinking. He died in 1921.
Murdock, Mr. William John	37	Engineering Crew	Fireman. He died in 1941.
Navratil, Master Edmond Roger	2	Second Class	French boy whose father had stolen him and his brother from his estranged wife. His father perished in the sinking and he and his brother became known as the Titanic orphans until they were reunited with their mother on 16 May 1912. He died in 1953.
Navratil, Master Michel Marcel	3	Second Class	French boy whose father had stolen him and his brother from his estranged wife. His father perished in the sinking and he and his brother became known as the Titanic orphans until they were reunited with their mother on 16 May 1912. Upon his death in 2001, he was the last surviving male passenger of the Titanic.
Nilsson, Miss Berta Olivia	18	Third Class	Swedish woman who was emigrating to the United States with her fiancé. Her fiancé was lost in the sinking. She died in 1976.
Nutbean, Mr. William	30	Engineering Crew	Fireman. He died in 1947.
Podesta, Mr. Alfred John Alexander	24	Engineering Crew	Fireman. He died in 1968.
Sincock, Miss Maude	20	Second Class	Canadian woman who was emigrating to the United States to join her father and sister in Michigan. She died in 1984.
Thorne, Mrs. Gertrude Maybelle (née McMinn)	37	First Class	American woman who was the mistress of George Rosenshine, he did not survive the sinking. She died in 1947.
Woolner, Mr. Hugh	45	First Class	American businessman who jumped into Collapsible D as it was being lowered. He died in 1925.

== In popular culture ==
Collapsible D is featured in the 1958 film A Night to Remember where Caroline Brown (Margaret Bull) and Edith Corse Evans (Olwen Brookes) are shown arriving at Collapsible D just as it's about to be lowered. Sixth Officer Moody (Michael Bryant) tells the ladies that there is only one place left in the boat, to which Miss Evans offers her place up for Miss Brown. Miss Brown refuses at first, but Miss Evans tells her that she has children waiting at home, convincing Miss Brown to board the boat which is then lowered away. The launching of Collapsible D is also featured in the 1979 TV film S.O.S. Titanic, but seems to depict the events that occurred near and on Collapsible C (which in reality was lowered on the opposite starboard side), such as First Officer Murdoch firing warning shots into the air after the Collapsible is rushed by Third-Class passengers, and the escape of White Star Line Chairman Bruce Ismay. The 1996 Titanic miniseries also incorrectly shows Ismay escaping on Collapsible D, but does show the Collapsible later waiting for the arrival of the RMS Carpathia alongside Lifeboats No. 14 and 10.

In the 1997 James Cameron film Titanic, Collapsible D is shown being filled with women and children by Chief Officer Wilde (Mark Lindsay Chapman) and Second Officer Lightoller (Jonathan Phillips), as they hold back any man from entering or rushing the lifeboat, even firing off warning shots into the air to drive them back. Rose DeWitt Bukater (Kate Winslet) is led by her love interest Jack Dawson (Leonardo DiCaprio) through the crowd and towards the Collapsible, but as Rose witnesses two girls being taken away from their father and placed crying in the Collapsible with their mother, she refuses to board the lifeboat without Jack. As Jack urges her to get on the lifeboat without him, they are joined by Rose's fiancé Caledon Hockley (Billy Zane) who reinforces Jack's sentiment. As she still refuses, Cal tells her about his arrangement with First Officer Murdoch (Ewan Stewart) on the starboard side of the ship and tries to reassure her that both he and Jack can get off Titanic safely. Rose still hesitates, but is grabbed by Chief Officer Wilde and helped aboard Collapsible D. Rose reaches for Jack and they hold hands one last time before Chief Officer Wilde shoves Jack back and starts lowering the boat. Jack and Cal share a conversation in which they both compliment each other on being good liars, while Cal reveals that the deal with the First Officer is real but that he wouldn't benefit from it, stating I always win Jack, one way or another. As Collapsible D is lowering away, Rose looks at Jack as he and Cal look back at her over the side of the railing. After the Collapsible nearly reaches the water, Rose decides she can't leave Jack to die alone and jumps off the Collapsible and back onto Titanic's A deck promenade, being helped back on board by two men while Jack and Cal shout at her to stop and get back on the lifeboat. Collapsible D is later seen again when a group of lifeboats assemble under the command of Fifth Officer Lowe (Ioan Gruffudd), after Titanic has gone down. Fifth Officer Lowe tells the boats' occupants that they have to go back and rescue any survivors and instructs the women to transfer to the other lifeboats to create some space in his lifeboat so he can go back. Rose is later saved from the water by Fifth Officer Lowe.

== See also ==
- Titanic Emergency Boat No. 1
- Titanic Lifeboat No. 6
- Titanic Lifeboat No. 14
- Titanic Collapsible Boat A
- Titanic Collapsible Boat B
- Titanic Collapsible Boat C

== Bibliography ==
- Butler, Daniel Allen (1998). Unsinkable. Stackpole Books. ISBN 978-0-8117-1814-1.
- Eaton, John P.; Haas, Charles A. (1994). Titanic: Triumph and Tragedy. Patrick Stephens. ISBN 978-1-85260-493-6.
- Gill, Anton (2010). Titanic: The Real Story of the Construction of the World's Most Famous Ship. Channel 4 Books. ISBN 9781905026715.
- Hutchings, David F.; de Kerbrech, Richard P. (2011). RMS Titanic 1909–12 (Olympic Class): Owners' Workshop Manual. Sparkford, Yeovil: Haynes. ISBN 978-1-84425-662-4.
- Wormstedt, Bill; Fitch, Tad (2011). "An Account of the Saving of Those on Board". In Halpern, Samuel (ed.). Report into the Loss of the SS Titanic: A Centennial Reappraisal. Stroud, UK: The History Press. ISBN 978-0-7524-6210-3.
