= Titanic Collapsible Boat A =

Lifeboat from the RMS Titanic

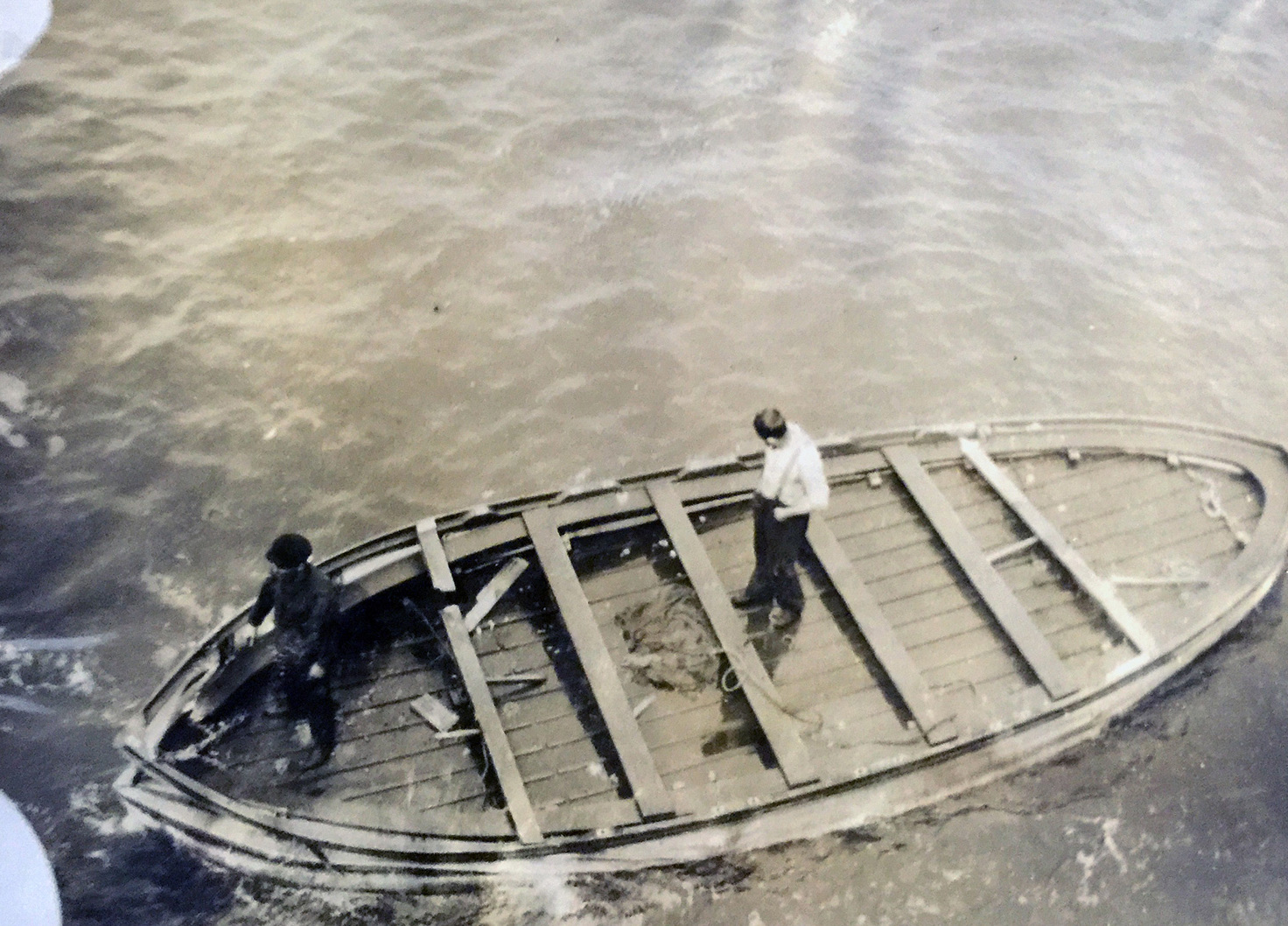
The Titanic Collapsible Boat A, found adrift by the RMS Oceanic on 13 May 1912.

Collapsible Boat A was a lifeboat from the Titanic. It was one of the last boats launched to sea, over two and a half hours after the Titanic collided with an iceberg and began sinking on 14 April 1912. Collapsible A could not be successfully launched, and it was washed off deck and partially submerged when the Titanic made her final plunge at 2.20 am. Despite being dangerously overloaded by the many people that climbed into her from the freezing water, most died of hypothermia or fell back into the sea. Only about 14 people including one woman were still alive on Collapsible A when they were rescued by Lifeboat No. 14 led by Fifth Officer Lowe.

== Description ==
Collapsible Boat A was located on the starboard side of the ship and was one of the four "collapsible" Engelhardt lifeboats. They were boat-shaped unsinkable rafts made of kapok and cork, with heavy canvas sides that were raised to form a boat. These "collapsible" boats measured 27 ft 5 in (8.36 m) long and 8 ft (2.4 m) wide by 3 ft (0.91 m) deep. Their capacities were of 376.6 cubic feet (10.66 m^{3}) and each could carry 47 people. Inspired in a Danish design, they were built by McAlister & Son of Dumbarton, Scotland. Their equipment was similar to that of the cutters, but they had no mast or sail, had eight oars apiece and were steered using a steering oar rather than a rudder.

Two Collapsible Boats were launched between 2.00 and 2.15 am, with only one from each side of the ship getting safely to sea. Collapsible Boat C (starboard) was launched at 2.00 am with about 43 people on board, including J. Bruce Ismay. Captain Smith ordered quartermaster George Rowe to board and take command of the raft. Collapsible Boat D (port) was also successful in its launching at 2.05 am, carrying about 20 people, and under the command of quartermaster Arthur Bright.

Two of the collapsibles were located on top of the Officer's Quarters and needed to be pushed off to be launched. While Collapsible A was brought down upright, Collapsible B fell over upside down. Both boats were not launched but were washed away as the water began reaching the bridge. Collapsible B floated off upside down and would eventually be taken charge off by Second Officer Charles Lightoller. Collapsible B had around 23 survivors when assisted by other lifeboats, including Wireless Operator Harold Bride, Chief Baker Charles Joughin and First-Class passengers Archibald Gracie IV and Jack Thayer. Collapsible A floated away right side up and had no crewmember in charge of it as Officers James Moody, William Murdoch, and Henry Wilde, handling the launch of A, were swept away after a surge of water from the staircase leading below decks.

== History ==
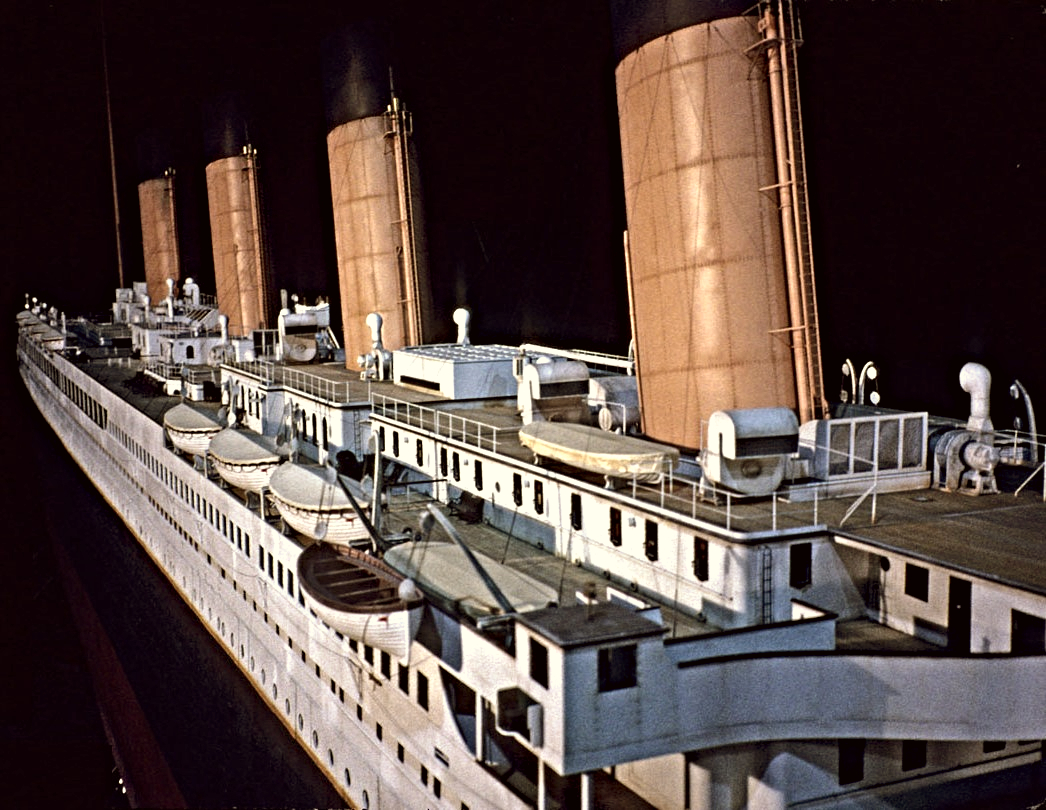
Titanic Starboard lifeboats. Collapsible A can be seen stored on top of the officers' quarters next to the forward funnel.

Collapsible Boat A was located on the roof of the officers' quarters. At around 2.00 am on 15 April 1912, Chief Officer Wilde, First Officer Murdoch, Sixth Officer Moody, Saloon Steward Edward Brown, Barber Augustus Henry Weikman and about two or three more crew members tried to take the Collapsible down by using a makeshift ramp made with two wooden planks, while two or three crewmen stood below on deck to receive the lifeboat. The men put the bow of the Collapsible on the planks and let it slide down to the boat deck below, where it broke the planks but landed right side up about halfway between the deck housing and the davits from where it was supposed to be launched. Due to Titanic's list to port, the starboard side of the ship was still free of the water while on the port side, the boat deck was already flooding. This gave First Officer Murdoch the wrong impression that there was still time to properly launch the Collapsible with the davits, going against Sixth Officer Moody's suggestion to let the Collapsible drift off the boatdeck. The crew weren't able to secure the falls to the Collapsible right away due to Titanic's port list, but were able to fasten it after slackening the falls. The list however, also made it difficult for the crew to get the Collapsible up the incline to the davits that had previously launched lifeboats 1 and C. By this time, about 50 people including four to five women amongst whom First-Class passengers Edith Evans, John Jacob Astor and George Widener, were gathered at the site of Collapsible A, awaiting its launch. Saloon Steward Edward Brown witnessed Captain Smith coming past the Collapsible at this point with a megaphone in his hand and saying Well, boys, do your best for the women and children, and look out for yourselves. before he returned to the bridge. Only seconds later at about 2.15 am, Titanic returned to an even keel and took a sudden dip, submerging the bridge and sending a wave roaring over the starboard boat deck, washing off Officers Wilde, Murdoch and Moody.

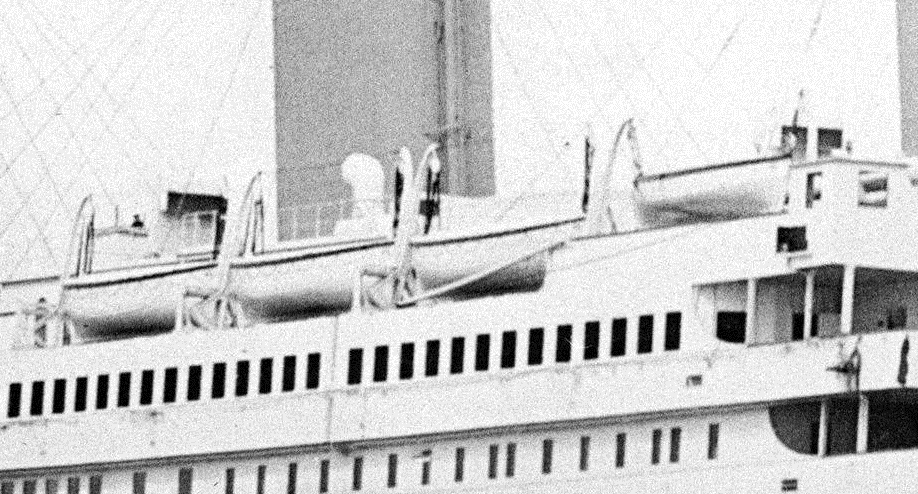
Starboard forward lifeboats on the Titanic. Collapsible A was attempted to be launched from the davits on the furthest right holding Emergency Boat No. 1.

Saloon Steward Edward Brown found himself knee-deep in the rising water, when he jumped in the still fastened Collapsible and started to cut the after fall with his pocketknife while shouting to the man at the forward end to do the same so the Collapsible wouldn't be dragged under with the Titanic. Many of the nearby passengers and crew who had waited for the lifeboat to be launched, now also scrambled into it to escape the rising water until the Collapsible was almost full. The lifeboat was already dragged halfway underwater by the time the falls were cut, and as it regained its buoyancy, the Collapsible sprang up out of the water, throwing her entire complement into the sea. As the Collapsible drifted away from the quickly foundering Titanic, many people were able to climb back onto it. However, in all the chaos, the canvas sides had not been pulled up and as the lifeboat became dangerously overloaded with about 30 to 45 passengers and crew, the Collapsible became awash with knee-deep icy seawater. Steerage passenger Olaus Abelseth swam to the Collapsible and held on to the side for a bit before getting on as the others on board had said to him Don't capsize the boat. He tried to raise the Collapsible's canvas sides, but was unable to. In the lifeboat, Abelseth encountered a dying man who he had shared a carriage on the boat train to Southampton with and tried to keep him alive by telling him to brace himself and that a ship was coming. The man however said to leave him be before succumbing to the cold.

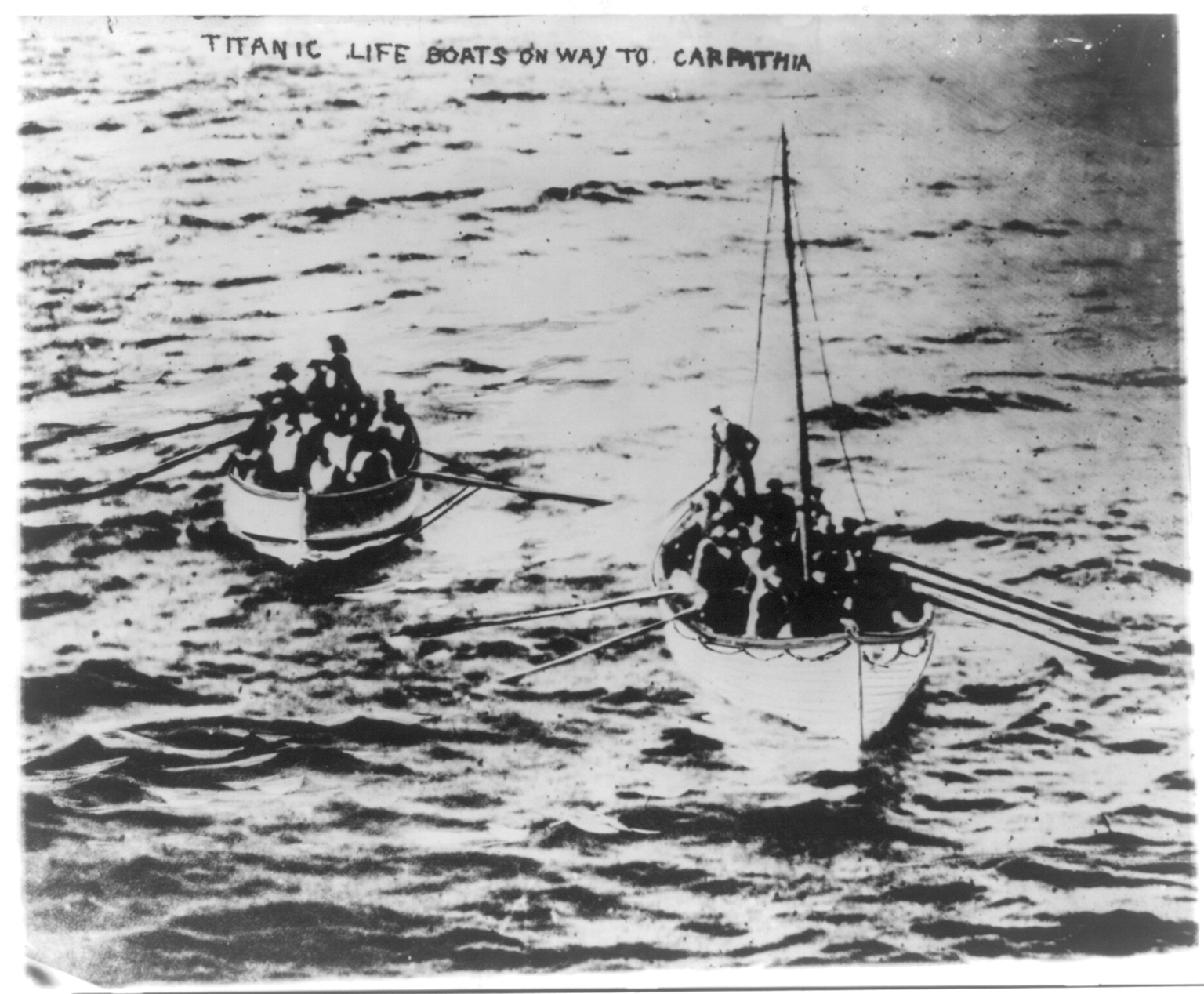
Lifeboat No. 14 towing Collapsible D towards the Carpathia with those rescued from Collapsible A.

First-Class passenger R. Norris Williams also clung onto the side before being able to climb into the lifeboat and Third-Class passenger Rhoda Abbott was helped into the Collapsible by its occupants. Saloon Steward Edward Brown also made it back onto Collapsible A after spending a lengthy time in the icy water. Swedish Third-class passenger August Wennerström was able to climb into the lifeboat alongside fellow Swedish steerage passenger Edvard Lindell. Lindell's wife Elin had also reached the Collapsible, but was too weak to climb into it and instead held onto her husband's hand until he grew too weak as well and had to let her go. According to Wennerström, Lindell's hair turned all gray in less than 30 minutes following the loss of his wife before he too succumbed to the cold and was lowered overboard. Many more died throughout the night, whereafter their bodies were also lowered overboard as to lighten the unstable half-submerged Collapsible. Some of those on Collapsible A prevented more swimmers from boarding the swamped lifeboat. As daylight rose once again over the Atlantic, steerage passenger Olaus Abelseth could see lifeboat No. 14 with Collapsible D under tow under the command of Fifth Officer Lowe approaching them and said alongside the other survivors in the Collapsible One, two, three, before they all screamed for help. Officer Lowe rescued about 14 survivors from Collapsible A and left behind three bodies of those who had died during the night but had not been lowered overboard. RMS Carpathia ultimately rescued all Titanic survivors on the morning of 15 April.

One month after the sinking on 13 May 1912, the RMS Oceanic (1899) encountered Collapsible A floating in the Atlantic near the Bermudas and send out one of their lifeboats to recover it. On the Collapsible, they found the decomposing bodies of two unidentified crewmen of Titanic and that of First-Class passenger Thomson Beattie. They also found the discarded fur coat of R. Norris Williams and the wedding ring of Elin Lindell on the Collapsible, which were returned to Williams and Lindell's father respectively. The bodies were subsequently buried at sea and the Collapsible was hoisted onto deck and taken to New York City, where it was placed together with Titanic's other lifeboats in storage at Pier 59 on 16 May.

== Occupants ==
The full list of survivors who were on board Collapsible A is not known, and most of those who reached the boat died from exposure to the cold during the night. This is a list of known passengers and crew who were saved by Collapsible A.

- First Class passenger
- Second Class passenger
- Third Class passenger
- Crew member

Name	Age	Class/Dept	Notes
Abbott, Mrs Rhoda	39	Third Class	Lost her two sons in the sinking and is the only female Titanic passenger to have been saved from the icy water. She died in 1946.
Abelseth, Mr Olaus Jørgensen	25	Third Class	Norwegian farmer emigrating to the United States. He was the only male survivor of his travelling party and died in 1980. He was also portrayed by Nick Brimble in the 1979 British TV film S.O.S. Titanic.
Brown, Mr Edward	34	Victualling Crew	First-Class steward whose lengthy time in the freezing water had caused his feet to swell up so much that it had burst his boots. Returned to work at sea and died in 1926.
Daly, Mr Peter Dennis	51	First Class	British businessman. He died in 1932.
Jansson, Mr Carl Olof	21	Third Class	Swedish carpenter who later admitted to pushing others away from Collapsible A as they tried to board it. He died in 1978.
Lucas, Mr William Watson	31	Victualling Crew	First-Class steward. Returned to sea and served on the RMS Empress of Australia when it was requisitioned for use as the Royal yacht for King George VI and Queen Elizabeth's Royal visit to Canada in May 1939. He died in 1944.
McIntyre, Mr William	21	Engineering Crew	Trimmer. Later served in World War I. He died in 1965.
Mellors, Mr William John	19	Second Class	British salesman who lived in Manhattan before moving to Detroit and working as an editor for the magazine The National Republic in the 1930s. He died in 1948.
Rheims, Mr George Alexander Lucien	33	First Class	American businessman. Claimed to have seen an officer commit suicide after announcing, Gentlemen, each man for himself. Good-bye. He died in 1963.
Thompson, Mr John William	41	Engineering Crew	Fireman. Broke his arm during the sinking and was taken unconscious into Lifeboat 14.
Weikman, Mr Augustus Henry	52	Victualling Crew	Barber. One of the few American crewmembers aboard; depended on tips from the First-Class passengers to make his living. A one-dollar bill that Weikman had with him during the sinking, sold at auction for $32,835 in April 2012. He died in 1924.
Wennerström, Mr August	27	Third Class	Swedish passenger who unsuccessfully tried to save Alma Pålsson and her children. Reportedly also witnessed an English lady sitting at the piano with her child on her knee, playing away while awaiting their fate. He died in 1950.
Williams, Mr Richard Norris	21	First Class	American tennis player. Barely escaped the collapsing forward funnel that went on to kill his father and many others in the water. After being rescued, the doctor on the Carpathia recommended the amputation of both his legs, but Williams refused and instead exercised his legs daily and went on to make a full recovery. He died in 1968.

=== Deceased occupants ===
The full list of people who managed to climb on board Collapsible A is not known, and only eyewitness accounts attest for those believed to have boarded Collapsible A only to die later from exposure during the night. This is a list of known passengers and crew who made it to Collapsible A but weren't rescued in time.

- First Class passenger
- Second Class passenger
- Third Class passenger
- Crew member

Name	Age	Class/Dept	Notes
Beattie, Mr Thomson	36	First Class	Canadian landowner. Body recovered by RMS Oceanic and buried at sea.
Lindell, Mr Edvard Bengtsson	36	Third Class	Swedish factory worker. Decided to emigrate to the United States with his wife. Managed to board the Collapsible and held onto his wife who was too weak to board the lifeboat until they both perished.
Lindell, Mrs Elin Gerda	30	Third Class	Wife of Edvard Bengtsson Lindell. Could not make it onto Collapsible A, so held her husband's hand who did manage to board it. She slipped from her husband's grasp and was lost, but her ring had slipped off and landed in the lifeboat. The ring was recovered the next month by RMS Oceanic and given to her father Nils Persson.
Unidentified		Crew	Unidentified crewmember recovered by RMS Oceanic and buried at sea.
Unidentified		Crew	Unidentified crewmember recovered by RMS Oceanic and buried at sea.

== In popular culture ==
Collapsible A is featured in the 1958 film A Night to Remember where officers Lightoller (Kenneth More), Murdoch (Richard Leech) and Moody (Michael Bryant) can be seen trying to get the lifeboat off of the roof of the officers' quarters, when the Titanic enters its final plunge, washing off the Collapsible and ship's officers. It is featured again in the 1979 TV film S.O.S. Titanic where Collapsible A survivor Olaus Abelseth is portrayed by Nick Brimble and shows the Collapsible being pushed off the sinking ship by the passengers and crew from the (incorrect) port side.

In the 1997 James Cameron film Titanic, Collapsible A is seen when Murdoch (Ewan Stewart) alongside other crewmen take it down from the roof of the officers' quarters. The scene shows it sliding down the oars and breaking them, subsequently smashing onto deck. It is later shown being filled with women on deck as the crew hold back all men with First Officer Murdoch even pointing a gun at them and threatening to shoot any man who tries to get past him. Caledon Hockley (Billy Zane) then approaches the First Officer about the deal he made with him, upon which the First Officer throws Cal's money back at him stating that it can't save him any more than it can save himself before pushing him back at gunpoint. A man then rushes the Collapsible, causing First Officer Murdoch to shoot the man. Tommy Ryan (Jason Barry) is accidentally pushed forward in the panic, causing him to be shot as well. As he dies on the deck in Fabrizio de Rossi's (Danny Nucci) arms, Fabrizio looks at the First Officer and calls him a bastard. After dealing with all the guilt, First Officer Murdoch salutes his colleague Chief Officer Wilde (Mark Lindsay Chapman) and then proceeds to commit suicide by shooting himself through the temple. (Note: Although several survivors have testified to witnessing an officer shoot two passengers and later himself near the site of Collapsible A, it is not known who that officer was nor has this incident truly been confirmed or disproven by account of the inconsistent testimonies of the few who witnessed the event and survived the sinking.) Cal, upon seeing this, decides to go and fetch a girl that he had found crying alone on the boat deck earlier, and uses her as leverage to circumvent the women and children only order. Cal is allowed to board Collapsible A by Chief Officer Wilde after tricking him that he is the child's only guardian. As Titanic enters its final plunge while the ship's orchestra plays nearer my god to thee, Caledon Hockley hands over the girl to Rhoda Abbott as Chief Officer Wilde orders the falls to be cut. Fabrizio alongside other crewmen proceed to cut the falls as the Collapsible is being pulled under alongside the Titanic and the lifeboat springs out of the water, spilling its entire complement except Caledon Hockley. He proceeds to prevent some people from climbing on board the Collapsible when the forward funnel collapses, killing Fabrizio and washing the lifeboat away from the sinking Titanic. Shortly after the collision, R. Norris Williams (who would go on to be rescued by Collapsible A) freed a trapped passenger from a cabin by breaking down a door. He was reprimanded by a steward, who threatened to fine him for damaging White Star Line property. This incident inspired a scene in James Cameron's film Titanic (1997).

== See also ==
- Titanic Emergency Boat No. 1
- Titanic Lifeboat No. 6
- Titanic Lifeboat No. 14
- Titanic Collapsible Boat B
- Titanic Collapsible Boat C
- Titanic Collapsible Boat D

== Bibliography ==
- Bartlett, W. B. (2011). Titanic: 9 Hours to Hell, the Survivors' Story. Stroud, Gloucestershire: Amberley Publishing. ISBN 978-1-4456-0482-4.
- Butler, Daniel Allen (1998). Unsinkable. Stackpole Books. ISBN 978-0-8117-1814-1.
- Eaton, John P.; Haas, Charles A. (1994). Titanic: Triumph and Tragedy. Patrick Stephens. ISBN 978-1-85260-493-6.
- Gill, Anton (2010). Titanic: The Real Story of the Construction of the World's Most Famous Ship. Channel 4 Books. ISBN 9781905026715.
- Hutchings, David F.; de Kerbrech, Richard P. (2011). RMS Titanic 1909–12 (Olympic Class): Owners' Workshop Manual. Sparkford, Yeovil: Haynes. ISBN 978-1-84425-662-4.
- Wormstedt, Bill; Fitch, Tad (2011). "An Account of the Saving of Those on Board". In Halpern, Samuel (ed.). Report into the Loss of the SS Titanic: A Centennial Reappraisal. Stroud, UK: The History Press. ISBN 978-0-7524-6210-3.
