= Titanic Collapsible Boat C =

Lifeboat from the RMS Titanic

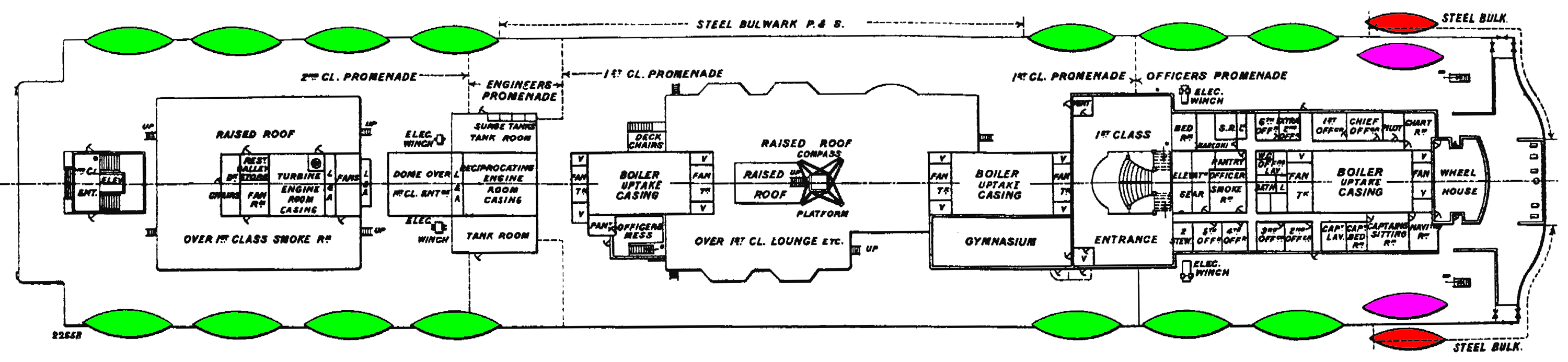
A plan of RMS Titanic's boat deck, with Collapsible C being shown in purple at the bottom right.

Collapsible Boat C was a lifeboat from the Titanic. It was one of the last boats launched to sea, over two and a half hours after the Titanic collided with an iceberg and began sinking on 14 April 1912. Collapsible C was the last lifeboat to be successfully launched from the starboard side between 1.40 and 2.00 am, and held amongst others White Star Line chairman Bruce Ismay. His survival would be marked with controversy following the disaster. About 44 people occupied the collapsible when they were rescued by RMS Carpathia at 5.45 am.

== Description ==
Collapsible Boat C was located on the starboard side of the ship and was one of the four "collapsible" Engelhardt lifeboats. They were boat-shaped unsinkable rafts made of kapok and cork, with heavy canvas sides that were raised to form a boat. These "collapsible" boats measured 27 ft 5 in (8.36 m) long and 8 ft (2.4 m) wide by 3 ft (0.91 m) deep. Their capacities were of 376.6 cubic feet (10.66 m^{3}) and each could carry 47 people. Inspired in a Danish design, they were built by McAlister & Son of Dumbarton, Scotland. Their equipment was similar to that of the cutters, but they had no mast or sail, had eight oars apiece and were steered using a steering oar rather than a rudder.

Collapsible C was one of two Collapsible Boats that were successfully launched between 2.00 and 2.15 am, with only one from each side of the ship getting safely to sea. Collapsible Boat C (starboard) was launched at 2.00 am with about 44 people on board under the command of Quartermaster George Rowe. Collapsible Boat D (port) was also successful in its launching at 2.05 am, carrying about 20 people, and under the command of Quartermaster Arthur Bright.

The two other collapsibles were located on top of the Officer's Quarters and needed to be pushed off to be launched. While Collapsible A was brought down upright, Collapsible B fell over upside down. Both boats were not launched but were washed away as the water began reaching the bridge. Collapsible B floated off upside down and would eventually be taken charge off by Second Officer Charles Lightoller. It had around 23 survivors when assisted by other lifeboats, including Wireless Operator Harold Bride, Chief Baker Charles Joughin and First-Class passengers Archibald Gracie IV and Jack Thayer. Collapsible A floated away right side up and had no crewmember in charge of it as Officers James Moody, William Murdoch, and Henry Wilde, handling the launch of A, were swept away after a surge of water from the staircase leading below decks. It had around 14 survivors when assisted by other lifeboats, including First-Class passenger R. Norris Williams and Third-Class passenger Rhoda Abbott.

== History ==
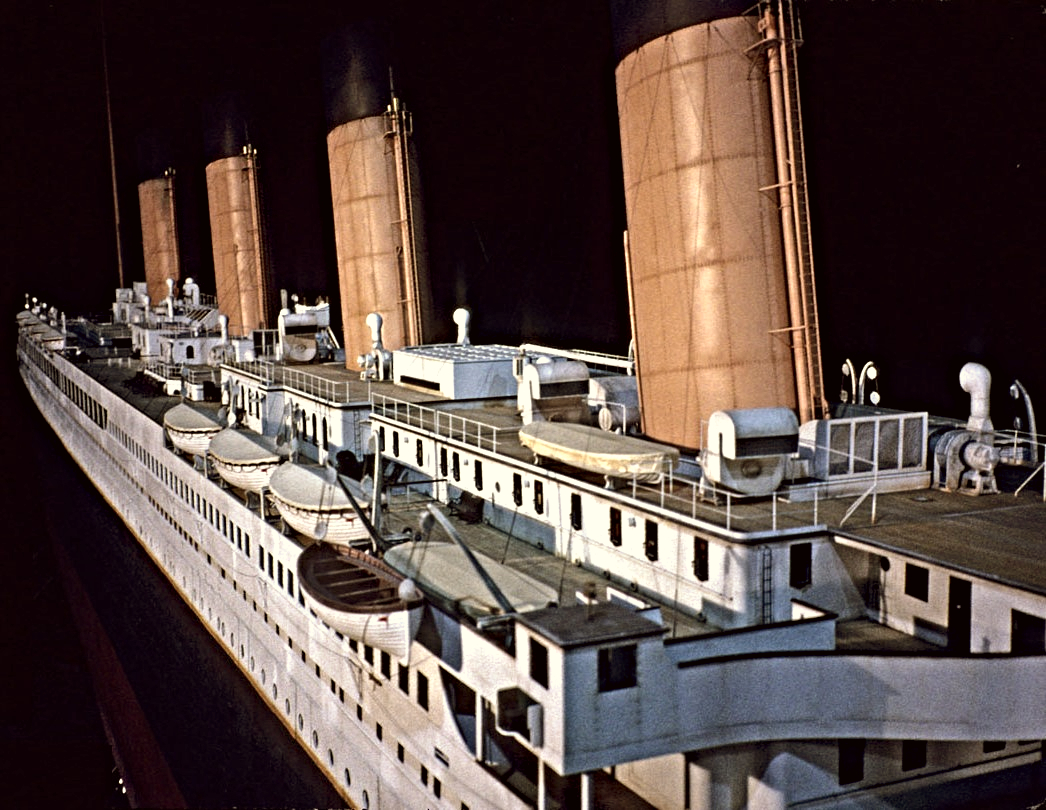
Titanic Starboard lifeboats. Collapsible C can be seen stored on deck next to the swung out Emergency Boat No. 1.

Collapsible Boat C was located on deck next to the swung out Emergency Boat No. 1. And on 15 April 1912, after Lifeboat No. 1 had been launched at 1.10 am, Collapsible C was retrieved from its stored position on the boat deck and had her canvas sides erected before it was attached to the davits and swung out over the side at about 1.40 am. Chief Officer Henry Wilde, First Officer William Murdoch and Purser McElroy oversaw the loading of the lifeboat and loaded mainly Third-Class women and children into it. During the loading process, a group of stewards and male Third-Class passengers began rushing the lifeboat. First Officer Murdoch tried to hold back the crowd as Purser McElroy attempted to drive the men back by firing two warning shots in the air. First-Class passengers Hugh Woolner and Mauritz Håkan Björnström-Steffansson decided to assist the crew in keeping the panicking crowd at bay and dragged out two stewards who had managed to jump into the Collapsible. White Star Line chairman Bruce Ismay who had already assisted in loading several lifeboats, also aided the women and children in boarding the Collapsible. With the passengers' aid, Officers Murdoch and Wilde managed to fill up the boat in a quick and orderly manner before ordering three firemen and a steward to man the oars. As the Collapsible didn't hold a sailor yet by this point, Chief Officer Wilde called out for one to man the lifeboat. At the same time, Quartermaster George Rowe approached Captain Smith on the starboard bridge wing and asked him if he should fire more distress rockets. The Captain told him No before ordering him to take command of Collapsible C. Quartermaster Rowe entered the lifeboat when it was nearly full and could only help about three women and three children enter the lifeboat before the order was given by Chief Officer Wilde to lower the boat at 2 am. However, before it was lowered, Chief Officer Wilde called out repeatedly for any more women and children to step forward. No women or children came forward as mainly crewmen remained on deck, and as the Collapsible started to lower away at nearly full capacity, First-Class passengers William E. Carter and Bruce Ismay noticed a few empty seats were left and subsequently stepped on board it. Collapsible C was the first of Titanic's four Collapsible boats to be launched that night and had about 44 of her 47 seats filled.

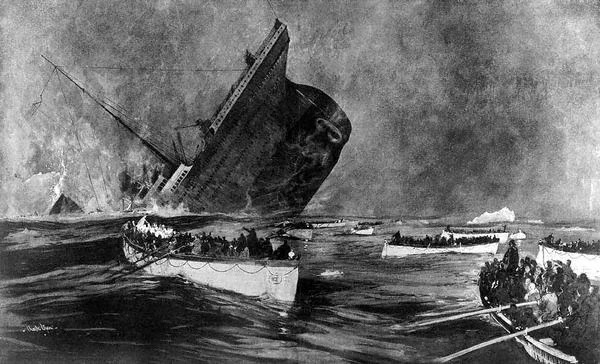
Titanic's final moments.

As the Titanic was suffering from a port list by this point, the gunwale of Collapsible C was catching upon the rivets of Titanic's hull and the lifeboat's occupants had to use their hands and the boat's oars to push the Collapsible away from the sinking ship as it was lowered. Upon reaching the water, Quartermaster Rowe noticed that the Titanic's forward well deck had already submerged, but that her forecastle was still partly above the water. After the people on the Collapsible started to row away from the Titanic, Quartermaster Rowe ordered to head for a white light of a possible rescue ship that he could see off Titanic's port bow. Rowe estimated the light to be 5 nautical miles (9.3 km) away from them and believed it was the stern light of a sailing ship. The Collapsible made it about 3/4 nautical mile (1.5 kilometres) away from the Titanic when she began her final plunge. Ismay, who was helping to row the Collapsible, decided to turn his back to the ship as he did not wish to see the Titanic founder. Quartermaster Rowe could hear a rumbling that he likened to a distant thunder as the liner went down and witnessed the ship's final moments as her stern slipped beneath the waves. As the lifeboat made no headway toward the light of the mystery ship, Quartermaster Rowe abandoned the effort to reach it and instead set course for another lifeboat that was carrying a green light. As daylight broke, Third-Class passenger Emily Alice Goldsmith and Quartermaster Rowe witnessed how four Chinese men emerged from between the seats of the lifeboat after they had stowed away during the loading of the Collapsible. (This account was disputed in the 2021 documentary The Six, which reconstructed the lifeboat to show there was no possible room for four people to hide under the seats.) Thanks to the daylight, the occupants of Collapsible C also noticed the arrival of the rescueship RMS Carpathia and they reached the steamer at 5.45 am, being the first Collapsible to be rescued. After all her occupants were safely aboard Carpathia, Collapsible C was set adrift alongside six other lifeboats of the Titanic as Carpathia didn't have the room to recover all 20 of Titanic's lifeboats. The lifeboat was never seen again.

== Occupants ==
This is a list of known passengers and crew who were saved by Collapsible C.

The Titanic had three classes (First, Second, and Third), aside from the crew. No second-class passenger boarded Boat C.

- First Class passenger
- Third Class passenger
- Crew member

Name	Age	Class/Dept	Notes
Abrahim, Mrs. Mary Sophie Halaut (née Easu)	18	Third Class	Syrian woman who was emigrating to the United States to join her husband in Pennsylvania. She died in 1976.
Assaf, Mrs. Mariyam (née Khalil)	45	Third Class	Syrian woman returning to Canada following a family visit.
Ayyub Dahir, Miss Bannurah	17	Third Class	Syrian woman who was emigrating to the United States to join her uncle and brother in Columbus, Ohio. She died in 1970.
Badman, Miss Emily Louisa	18	Third Class	British woman who was emigrating to the United States to join her siblings in New York. She claimed to have seen two men being shot by an officer on the boat deck. She died in 1946.
Baqlini, Mrs. Mariyam Latifa (née Qurban)	24	Third Class	Syrian woman who was emigrating to the United States with her three daughters to join her husband in Brooklyn. She died in 1962.
Baqlini, Miss Mariya Katarin	5	Third Class	Syrian girl who was emigrating to the United States with her mother and two sisters to join her father in Brooklyn. She died in 1982.
Baqlini, Miss Eujini	4	Third Class	Syrian girl who was emigrating to the United States with her mother and two sisters to join her father in Brooklyn. She died on 30 August 1912 and was the second Titanic survivor to die.
Baqlini, Miss Hileni Barbarah	9 mo.	Third Class	Syrian girl who was emigrating to the United States with her mother and two sisters to join her father in Brooklyn. She died in 1939.
Butrus-Youssef, Mrs. Katarin (née Rizk)	24	Third Class	Syrian woman who was returning to the United States with her daughter following a family visit. She died in 1915.
Butrus-Youssef, Miss Marianna	2	Third Class	Syrian girl who returning to the United States with her mother following a family visit. She died in 1914.
Carter, Mr. William Ernest	36	First Class	American businessman who was returning to the United States with his wife and two children. His family was saved on Lifeboat No. 4. He died in 1940.
Chang, Mr. Chip	32	Third Class	Chinese seaman who was travelling to New York City with eight colleagues to join the Donald Line's steamship Annetta as a fireman. He died in 1914.
Devaney, Miss Margaret Delia	20	Third Class	Irish woman who was emigrating to the United States to join her siblings in New York. She died in 1974.
Goldsmith, Mrs. Emily Alice (née Brown)	31	Third Class	British woman who was emigrating to the United States with her son and husband to join her parents and siblings in Detroit. Her husband was lost in the sinking. She died in 1955.
Goldsmith, Master Frank John William	9	Third Class	British boy who was emigrating to the United States with his parents to join his mother's family in Detroit. His father was lost in the sinking. He died in 1982.
Hellström, Miss Hilda Maria	22	Third Class	Swedish woman who was emigrating to the United States to join her widowed aunt in Illinois. She died in 1962.
Hing, Mr. Lee	24	Third Class	Chinese seaman who was travelling to New York City with eight colleagues to join the Donald Line's steamship Annetta as a fireman.
Howard, Miss May Elizabeth	26	Third Class	British woman who was emigrating to the United States to join her sister after having secured work as a nanny for the Kenyon family in New York. She died in 1958.
Hunt, Mr. Albert Sylvanus	23	Engineering Crew	Trimmer who was serving with his brother and brother-in-law. His brother perished in the sinking. He died in 1949.
Ismay, Mr. Joseph Bruce	49	First Class	Chairman of the White Star Line who accompanied Titanic on her maiden voyage as he occasionally did with other ships of his fleet. Assisted in loading many lifeboats during the sinking before escaping the doomed vessel at the last moment. His survival was widely condemned considering the inadequate lifeboat provision and huge loss of life. He died in 1937.
Jirjis, Mrs. Shaniini (née Whabee Abi-Saab)	38	Third Class	Syrian woman who was returning to the United States with her three male cousins. She witnessed the warning shots fired by the crew as she boarded the Collapsible. All three of her cousins perished in the sinking. She died in 1947.
Knowles, Mr. Thomas	44	Engineering Crew	Fireman's Messman. He died in 1951.
Lam, Mr. Ah	37	Third Class	Chinese seaman who was travelling to New York City with eight colleagues to join the Donald Line's steamship Annetta as a fireman.
Lee, Mr. Bing	32	Third Class	Chinese seaman who was travelling to New York City with eight colleagues to join the Donald Line's steamship Annetta as a fireman.
Mills, Mr. Christopher	51	Victualling Crew	Butcher. He died in 1930.
Mubarik, Mrs. Amanah Fa'ud (née Iskandar)	25	Third Class	Syrian woman who was emigrating to the United States with her two sons, sister and brother-in-law to join her husband in Pennsylvania. Her brother-in-law perished in the sinking. She died in 1922.
Mubarik, Master Gerios	7	Third Class	Syrian boy who was emigrating to the United States with his mother, brother, aunt and uncle to join his father in Pennsylvania. His uncle perished in the sinking. He died in 1979.
Mubarik, Master Halim Gonios	4	Third Class	Syrian boy who was emigrating to the United States with his mother, brother, aunt and uncle to join his father in Pennsylvania. His uncle perished in the sinking. He died in 1975.
Muslamani, Mrs. Fatimah	22	Third Class	Syrian woman who was emigrating to the United States with her two male cousins. Her cousins perished in the sinking. She died in 1971.
Nackid, Mr. Sahid	20	Third Class	Syrian man who was emigrating to the United States with his wife and daughter to join his mother in Connecticut. He lay under cover in the bottom of the boat for nearly five hours out of fear of being discovered. He died in 1926.
Nackid, Miss Waika "Mary" (née Mowad)	19	Third Class	Syrian woman who was emigrating to the United States with her husband and daughter to join her mother-in-law in Connecticut. She died in 1963.
Nackid, Miss Maria	1	Third Class	Syrian girl who was emigrating to the United States with her parents to join her grandmother in Connecticut. She died on 30 July 1912 and was the first Titanic survivor to die.
Niqula-Yarid, Miss Jamilah	14	Third Class	Syrian girl who was emigrating to the United States with her brother to join her mother and other siblings in Florida. She died in 1970.
Niqula-Yarid, Master Ilyas	11	Third Class	Syrian boy who was emigrating to the United States with his sister to join his mother and other siblings in Florida. He died in 1981.
Öhman, Miss Velin	22	Third Class	Swedish woman who was emigrating to the United States to join her fiancé in Chicago. She died in 1966.
Pearcey, Mr. Albert Victor	25	Victualling Crew	Third Class Pantry Steward who claimed to have collected two babies on the boat deck and took them to Collapsible C before being ordered to man the boat by First Officer Murdoch to take care of the infants. He died in 1952.
Roth, Miss Sarah A.	26	Third Class	Polish woman who was emigrating to the United States to join her fiancé in New York City. They wed in St Vincent's Hospital only a week after the sinking. She died in 1947.
Rowe, Mr. George Thomas	32	Deck Crew	Quartermaster who was ordered to command the boat by Captain Smith after having fired several distress rockets. He died in 1974.
Salkjelsvik, Miss Anna Kristine	21	Third Class	Norwegian woman who was emigrating to the United States to join her sister in Minnesota. She died in 1977.
Touma, Mrs. Hanna Youssef (née Razi)	27	Third Class	Syrian woman who was emigrating to the United States with her two children to join her husband in Michigan. She died in 1976.
Touma, Miss Marianna Youssef	9	Third Class	Syrian girl who was emigrating to the United States with her mother and brother to join her father in Michigan. She died in 1953.
Touma, Master Gerios (George) Youssef	8	Third Class	Syrian boy who was emigrating to the United States with his mother and sister to join his father in Michigan. He died in 1991.
Zajib Qiyamah, Miss Adal "Jane"	15	Third Class	Syrian girl who was emigrating to the United States to join her father in Brooklyn. She died in 1924.

== Ismay Controversy ==
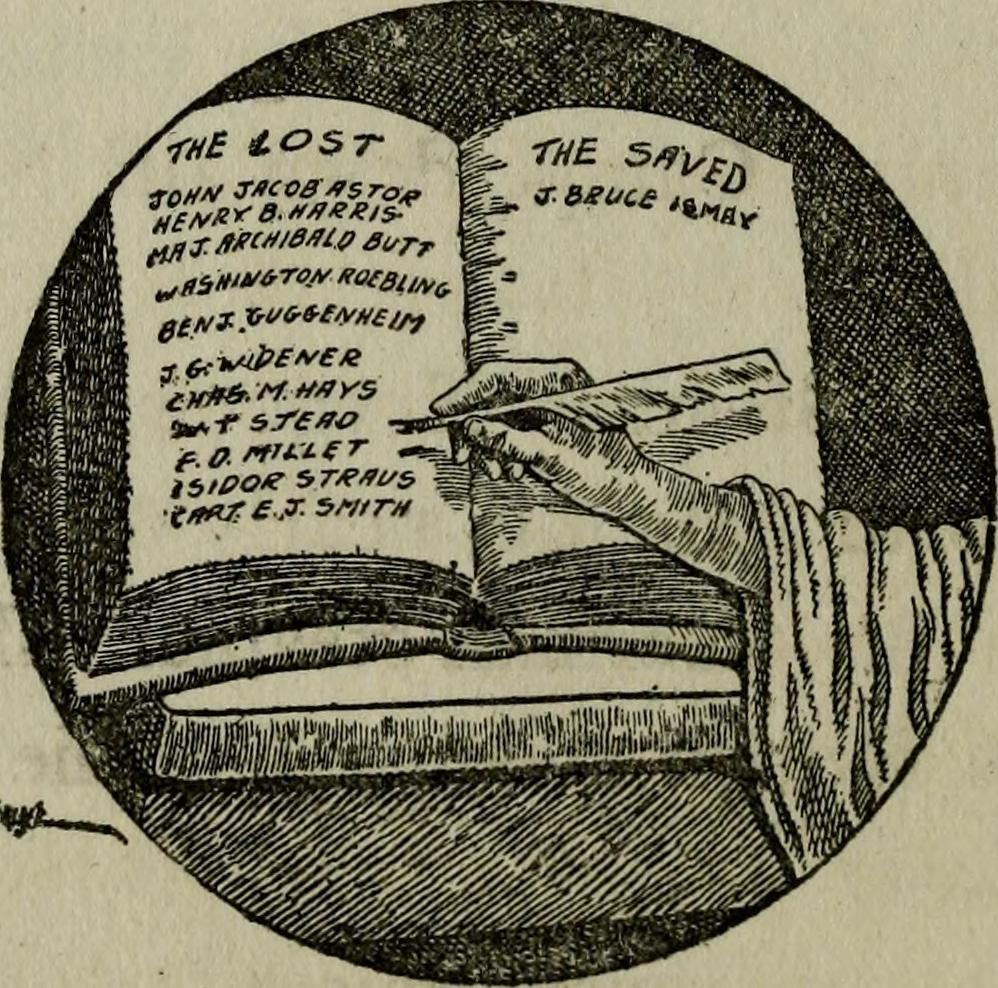
Drawing from the 1912 book Wreck and sinking of the Titanic criticising Ismay by comparing his survival to a list of notable individuals who perished with Titanic

Ismay was quickly criticized by both the American and the British press for deserting the ship while women and children were still on board. Certain newspapers called him the Coward of the Titanic or J. Brute Ismay, and suggested that the White Star flag be should be changed to a yellow liver. Others ran negative cartoons depicting him deserting the ship, while writer Ben Hecht wrote a scathing poem about Ismay's actions on Titanic. The American yellow press, which heavily vilified Ismay, was controlled by William Randolph Hearst, who had already fallen out with Ismay before the Titanic disaster.

On the other side, were those who defended Ismay and said that he had followed the women and children first command by assisting in loading them into the lifeboats. Ismay's actions were also defended in the official British inquiry which was led by Lord Mersey, stating that Ismay offered to help the women and children to the best of his ability and as there were no other people around, only left the ship on the last lifeboat as he saw a vacant seat. They added that had he not done so, he would have merely needlessly added his own name to the number of those lost.

However, London society decided to ostracise Ismay, labelling him a coward. While the American public used him as a scapegoat and also branded him a coward. On 30 June 1913, Ismay resigned as president of International Mercantile Marine and chairman of the White Star Line. Before doing so, Ismay had already stated in the United States Inquiry that all the vessels of the International Mercantile Marine Company would be equipped with lifeboats in sufficient numbers for all passengers. He kept a low profile for the remainder of his life and never spoke of the disaster again. He died in 1937.

== In popular culture ==
Collapsible C is featured in several Titanic media, mainly because of the controversy that was created about Bruce Ismay's escape from the Titanic on it. Because of the vilified depictions of Ismay in the media as edged on by William Randolph Hearst shortly after the sinking, various pieces of Titanic media have depicted Ismay either in an unfavorable light or almost as a villain.

In the 1958 film A Night to Remember, Collapsible C's launch is shown as being chaotic, with First Officer Murdoch (Richard Leech) holding back a crowd of men with the assistance of several other crewmen, while Bruce Ismay (Frank Lawton) helps the women to board the lifeboat. First Officer Murdoch shouts that there is no more room on the Collapsible, and the men on deck are ordered by the crew to move aft, which they all do. With order being restored, First Officer Murdoch prepares to lower the boat while Ismay asks him if there is no one else left to board, to which he does not receive a reply. As the boat starts lowering away, Ismay hesitates, but still chooses to board the lifeboat. In response, First Officer Murdoch halts the boat and stares silently at Ismay before deciding to proceed with the lowering of the Collapsible. Ismay is later shown on board Collapsible C, facing away from the Titanic and beginning to cry as she enters her final minutes. Ismay's escape on Collapsible C is also featured in the 1979 TV film S.O.S. Titanic, again painting him (portrayed by Ian Holm) in a bad light as his escape is witnessed by Captain Smith (Harry Andrews) and other members of the crew and some passengers, who proceed to stare at him in disbelief to the fact that he's abandoning the ship and all those left on board her. The movie however depicts Collapsible C's launch occurring on Titanic's port side, while in reality she was launched on the starboard side.

The 1996 Titanic miniseries also portrays Collapsible C launching from the inaccurate port side and shows Ismay (Roger Rees) quickly boarding the lifeboat as it launches while no other men were allowed to enter the boat. The women on the lifeboat then proceed to berate his actions as shameful. Collapsible C features a final time in the miniseries as Ismay looks on as the Titanic sinks, crying and covering his eyes. This is also inaccurate as the real Ismay testified that he had his back turned to the sinking Titanic as he did not wish to see her go down. In the 1997 James Cameron film Titanic, Collapsible C is shown being filled with women by First Officer Murdoch (Ewan Stewart) alongside other crewmen and Bruce Ismay (Jonathan Hyde), before First Officer Murdoch asks if any more women and children are present. Ismay replies that all are aboard, to which First Officer Murdoch says that anyone else can now board the lifeboat. Several men are seen entering the Collapsible while Rose DeWitt Bukater (Kate Winslet) her fiancée Caledon Hockley (Billy Zane) contemplates entering the lifeboat with his valet Spicer Lovejoy (David Warner), but ultimately decides against it and instead heads to the port side to confront Rose who Lovejoy had spotted waiting to board Collapsible D with Jack Dawson (Leonardo DiCaprio). After Cal and Lovejoy leave, Ismay is seen looking aft at all the people still left on the ship while none remain near the site of Collapsible C. First Officer Murdoch gives the order to lower the boat just as Ismay decides to enter it. First Officer Murdoch sees this and stares silently at Ismay before deciding to lower the lifeboat. Collapsible C is shown one last time just before Titanic's lights cut out, and shows its occupants staring in horror at the quickly foundering Titanic while Ismay decides to look away from the scene, not wishing to see the Titanic go down.

Collapsible C also features in the 2012 Titanic miniseries, which shows the fictional characters Lady Manton (Geraldine Somerville), her daughter Georgiana (Perdita Weeks), their maid Mabel Watson (Lyndsey Marshal) and cabin steward Annie Desmond (Jenna Coleman) boarding the lifeboat with the help of Harry Widener (Noah Reid) and Bruce Ismay (James Wilby). Fifth Officer Lowe (Ifan Meredith) is ordered by First Officer Murdoch (Brian McCardie) to take command of the Collapsible, and as Collapsible C is being launched, Ismay steps in which prompts Lady Manton to stare at him in disbelief as she had to leave her husband the Earl of Manton (Linus Roache) behind on the boat deck. After the Titanic had sunk, Lady Manton and her daughter urge for Fifth Officer Lowe and Ismay to go back and rescue those in the water. Fifth Officer Lowe decides to assemble several lifeboats (Emergency Lifeboat No. 2, Lifeboat No. 5, and Lifeboat No. 6) and transfer some of his passengers to the other boats as he returns to rescue survivors in a nearly empty lifeboat. The characters await his return in Collapsible C and Fifth Officer Lowe returns with three men although one had already passed away. Lady Manton's husband is one of the men who was saved, but is close to death, prompting actress Dorothy Gibson (Sophie Winkleman) to revive him with a shot of brandy. Several inaccuracies are portrayed in the series surrounding Collapsible C, such as the fact that Fifth Officer Lowe wasn't in charge of the Collapsible, as he had already left the Titanic on Lifeboat No. 14 half an hour before Collapsible C was launched. Quartermaster George Thomas Rowe was the real person in charge of the Collapsible, as it held no ship's officers. Collapsible C also didn't pick up any survivors from the water nor was she part of the group of lifeboats that were assembled by Fifth Officer Lowe to be rearranged so he could go back to save those struggling in the water (those were Lifeboats No. 4, No. 10, No. 12, No. 14 and Collapsible Boat D). Dorothy Gibson is also depicted in the miniseries as escaping the Titanic on Lifeboat No. 6, which later appears as part of Lowe's flottila. However, in reality Gibson left the ship on the very first lifeboat to be lowered from the Titanic, namely Lifeboat No. 7, and neither Lifeboat No. 7 nor Lifeboat No. 6 were part of Lowe's flottila in 1912.

== See also ==
- Titanic Emergency Boat No. 1
- Titanic Lifeboat No. 6
- Titanic Lifeboat No. 14
- Titanic Collapsible Boat A
- Titanic Collapsible Boat B
- Titanic Collapsible Boat D

== Bibliography ==
- Butler, Daniel Allen (1998). Unsinkable. Stackpole Books. ISBN 978-0-8117-1814-1.
- Eaton, John P.; Haas, Charles A. (1994). Titanic: Triumph and Tragedy. Patrick Stephens. ISBN 978-1-85260-493-6.
- Gill, Anton (2010). Titanic: The Real Story of the Construction of the World's Most Famous Ship. Channel 4 Books. ISBN 9781905026715.
- Hutchings, David F.; de Kerbrech, Richard P. (2011). RMS Titanic 1909–12 (Olympic Class): Owners' Workshop Manual. Sparkford, Yeovil: Haynes. ISBN 978-1-84425-662-4.
- Piouffre, Gérard (2009). Le Titanic ne répond plus (in French). Larousse. ISBN 978-2-263-02799-4.
- Wilson, Andrew (2012a). Shadow of the Titanic: the extraordinary stories of those who survived. Atria Books. ISBN 978-1451671568.
- Wormstedt, Bill; Fitch, Tad (2011). "An Account of the Saving of Those on Board". In Halpern, Samuel (ed.). Report into the Loss of the SS Titanic: A Centennial Reappraisal. Stroud, UK: The History Press. ISBN 978-0-7524-6210-3.
