= Titanic Emergency Boat No. 1 =

Lifeboat on the Titanic

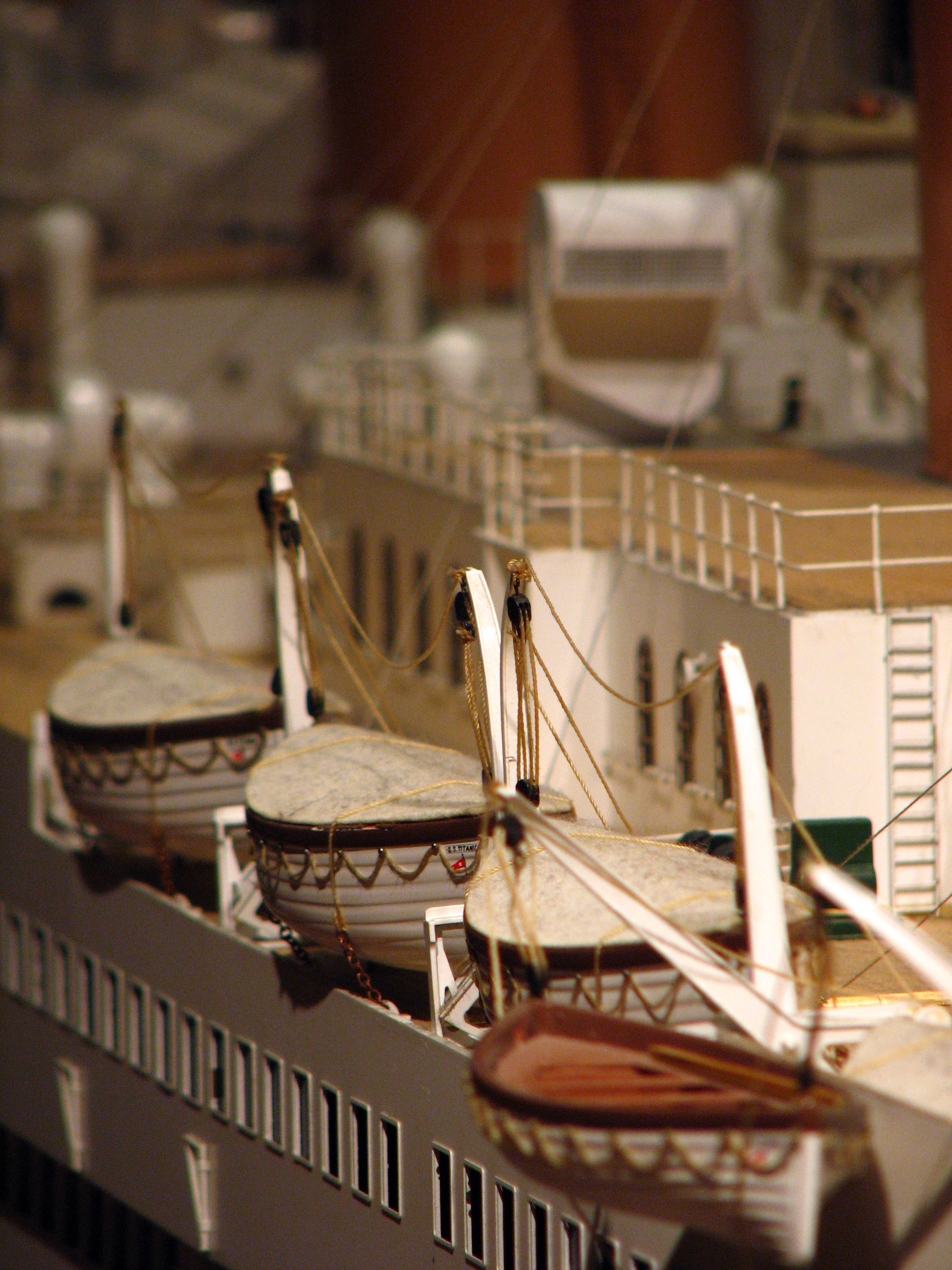
Boat No. 1 (front) emergency cutter as shown on a large-scale Titanic model

Titanic Emergency Boat No. 1 was a lifeboat from the steamship Titanic. It was the fifth boat launched to sea, over an hour after the liner collided with an iceberg and began sinking on 14 April 1912. With a capacity of 40 people, it was launched with only 12 aboard, the fewest to escape in any one boat that night.

== Description ==
Boat No. 1 was one of two small "emergency" wooden cutters that were located one on each side of the Titanic; No. 1 was on the starboard side. While they could be used as lifeboats, their primary purpose was to serve the crew in the event of an emergency, such as a man overboard, and were therefore already swung out from the rail to be launched quickly. The capacity of both emergency boat's capacity was, under then Board of Trade standards, 40 people.

== History ==
Boat No. 1 was the fifth lifeboat launched from RMS Titanic at 1:05 am, well over an hour after the liner collided with an iceberg and began sinking on 14 April 1912. The lifeboat had a capacity of 40 people, but was launched with only 12 aboard, the fewest to escape in any one boat that night. Most of the occupants of Boat 1 were men, despite Captain Smith's call for "women and children first." First Officer William Murdoch, in charge of the evacuation effort on the ship's starboard side, allowed a number of male passengers to board lifeboats if women were not around; assisting him in loading the forward starboard boats was Fifth Officer Harold Lowe.

At Boat 1, Murdoch and Lowe permitted five passengers into the boat, Murdoch placed in seven crewmembers into the emergency cutter. The passengers were Sir Cosmo Duff Gordon; his wife Lucy, Lady Duff-Gordon; her secretary, Mabel Francatelli; Abraham Salomon and C. E. Henry Stengel. The crewmen were Lookout George Symons, whom Murdoch placed in charge of the craft, Firemen Charles Hendrickson, Samuel Collins, George Taylor, Frederick Sheath, and Robert Pusey, and Able Seaman Albert Horswill.

Lowe, as well as crew and passengers in No. 1, later recalled there were few passengers around the front of the ship at the time so he "cleared the deck." The absence of people was likely due to Fourth Officer Joseph Boxhall firing distress rockets to signal a nearby ship spotted just off the port bow; the rockets were being launched very close to the boats and Boxhall had to constantly clear out passengers and crew out of the way to avoid any injuries.

After Murdoch gave the order to lower away, Lowe saw Boat No. 1 lowered until it was in the water, when he gave them the order to clear the ship's side but remain "within hail." The boat did not clear the side of the ship for some time, perhaps not until about 1:15 am, owing to a mishap encountered on its descent from the boat deck. A protuberance called a spar, at about the B-Deck level, caught on the boat's gunwales, arresting the lowering process. It was not until the crew used a wire cutter to chop the obstacle away that the boat was freed and able to reach the sea.

Boat No. 1 and its occupants were picked up by RMS Carpathia sometime shortly after 4:10 am, being the second Titanic lifeboat to reach the rescue ship. The boat's occupants were subsequently photographed as a group on the Carpathia. The boat was hoisted aboard the Carpathia along with other Titanic lifeboats and brought to New York. One of the davits from which Boat 1 was lowered remains upright on the wreck of the Titanic in relatively good condition.

Due to rumors that Sir Cosmo had bribed the crew in his boat not to rescue people left in the water after the ship went down, some New York press reports dubbed Boat 1 the "Money Boat". The appearance of the Duff-Gordons as witnesses at the British investigation into the disaster drew the largest crowds seen during the inquiry.

== Controversy ==
According to the British Inquiry testimony of crew member Charles Hendrickson, he had proposed returning to rescue survivors after the Titanic sank, but "the women objected." Consequently, he claimed, the boat did not go back to pick up swimmers, although he admitted there was "plenty of room for another dozen". It was also claimed during the course of the inquiry by crewman George Symons and others that it was Lucy Duff Gordon who expressed concern that the lifeboat might be swamped if it returned. She denied the charge and her testimony was supported by other crewmembers who revealed they had not heard her objection nor any proposal to turn back.

According to the testimony of Robert Pusey, a conversation concerning money occurred in the boat at about 3 a.m., nearly an hour after the Titanic sank. He claimed the discussion was prompted by a private comment Lucy Duff Gordon made to Mabel Francatelli: "There is your beautiful nightdress gone." Overhearing the exchange, Pusey replied, "Never mind, you have saved your lives," afterwards complaining that he and the other sailors had not only lost everything but their pay had stopped from the time the ship went down; to which Cosmo Duff Gordon responded, "I will give you a fiver each to start a new kit." (Note: A sailor's kit generally includes linens, uniforms, related clothing and accessories, and items required to perform their duties) On 16 April, the day after their rescue by the Carpathia, each Boat 1 crew member received a £5 (Note: £494.00 in today's currency, one month's pay for a seaman in the merchant service) cheque from Cosmo Duff Gordon.

The British inquiry issued a report after reviewing the evidence of their probe, which included sworn testimony from every member of Boat 1's crew as well as an affidavit from Mabel Francatelli. (Note: Laura Mabel Francatelli, secretary/personal assistant to Lucy Duff Gordon, referred to affectionately as "Miss Franks") The report stated:

The very gross charge against Sir Cosmo Duff Gordon that, having got into No. 1 boat, he bribed the men in it to row away from the drowning people, is unfounded.

The report, however, admonished the occupants of Boat 1 for not making an effort to rescue survivors from the water.

== Occupants ==
- First Class passenger
- Crew member

Name	Age	Class/Dept	Notes
Collins, Mr. Samuel	35	Engine	Fireman (Note: Stoker on a steam engine)
Duff-Gordon, Sir Cosmo Edmund	49	First Class	5th Baronet; (Note: Duff Gordon Baronetcy, of Halkin in the County of Aberdeen; 1813) Scottish landowner and sportsman who was a fencing competitor in the 1906 Olympic Games in Athens, and served on the committee for the 1908 London Olympics.
Duff Gordon, Lady Lucy Christiana	48	First Class	Née Sutherland; couturier known as Lucile, founder of and chief designer for Lucile Ltd, considered the first global couture house.
Francatelli, Miss Laura Mabel	31	First Class	Lucy Duff Gordon's secretary
Hendrickson, Mr. Charles George	29	Engine	Leading fireman
Horsewill, Mr. Albert Edward James	33	Deck	Able seaman
Pusey, Mr. Robert William	24	Engine	Fireman
Salomon, Mr. Abraham "Abram" Lincoln	43	First Class	Owner of a wholesale stationery business in New York.
Sheath, Mr. Fredrick	20	Engine	Coal trimmer
Stengel, Mr. Charles Emil Henry	54	First Class	Leather manufacturer from Newark, N. J.; his wife Annie May survived, having boarded lifeboat #5 earlier
Symons, Mr. George Thomas Macdonald	24	Deck	Lookout; placed in charge of No. 1
Taylor, Mr. George	24	Engine	Stoker; signed on under his brother's name: "James Taylor"

== Boat 1 in popular culture ==
In a deleted scene in James Cameron's 1997 film Titanic, Sir Cosmo Duff Gordon (Martin Jarvis) and Lady Duff Gordon (Rosalind Ayres) are shown seated in Lifeboat No. 1 when Fireman Hendrickson recommends rescuing people in the water. Sir Cosmo looks at his wife, who appears distressed, before replying, "It's out of the question."

In the 2012 television mini-series Titanic, Lady Duff Gordon (Sylvestra Le Touzel) is shown standing in Boat 1, urging her secretary to get in with her, saying, "Don't be a fool Francatelli, this boat isn't sinking, that one is," pointing to the ship. She is later shown telling Officer Lowe to allow some men to board, including her husband, then ordering him to lower the boat.

The loading and launching of Boat 1, and the occupants' decision not to return to the wreck site after the Titanic's sinking, was also portrayed in the 1958 film A Night to Remember, based on Walter Lord's namesake book. Miss Francatelli (who was still alive at the time) was completely omitted.

== See also ==
- Titanic Lifeboat No. 6
- Titanic Lifeboat No. 14
- Titanic Collapsible Boat A
- Titanic Collapsible Boat B
- Titanic Collapsible Boat C
- Titanic Collapsible Boat D
- Passengers of the Titanic
- Crew of the Titanic
