= Titanic Lifeboat No. 14 =

Lifeboat from the RMS Titanic

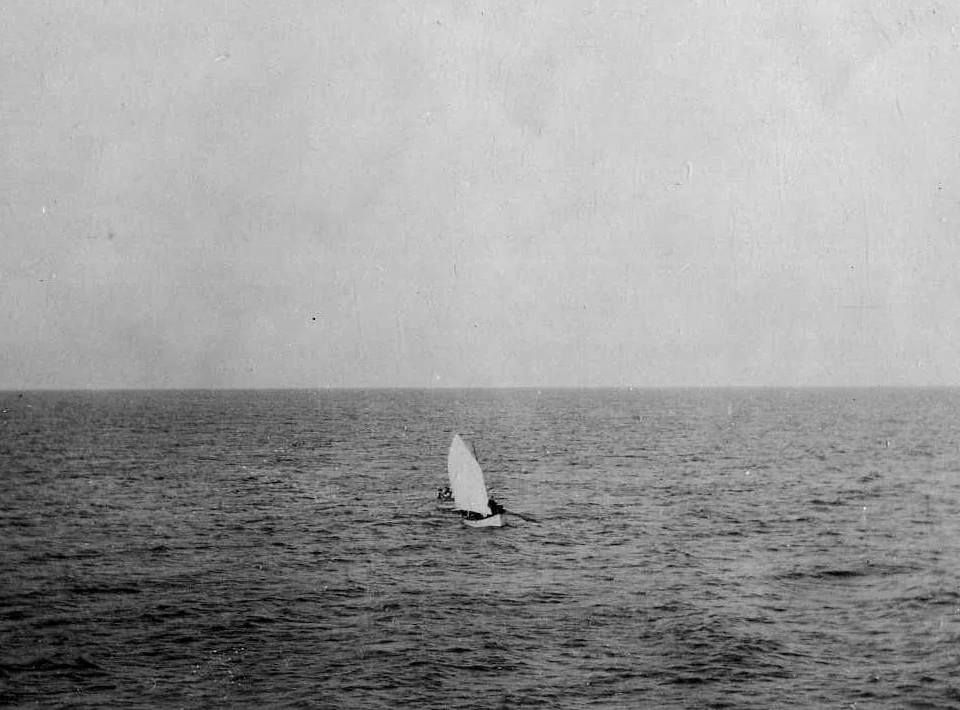
Lifeboat No. 14, under sail, approaching the RMS Carpathia.

RMS Titanic's Lifeboat No. 14 was one of the ship's fourteen main lifeboats, located on the port side; under British Board of Trade rules, the lifeboat had an official capacity of 65.

It was launched to sea around 1:30 am, nearly two hours after the Titanic collided with an iceberg and began sinking on 14 April 1912. Lifeboat No. 14 is best known for being the only lifeboat to return to search for survivors in the icy waters after Titanic had sunk, under the command of Fifth Officer Harold Lowe and crewed by six volunteering men. From the water, they managed to save four people (one of whom died soon after rescue) and then picked up around 12 to 14 survivors from the swamped Collapsible Boat A.

About 45 to 55 people occupied Lifeboat No. 14 when it was launched from Titanic and around 30 occupied it when they were rescued by RMS Carpathia at 7:15 am. On the way to Carpathia, the boat also took Collapsible Boat D into tow.

== Background ==
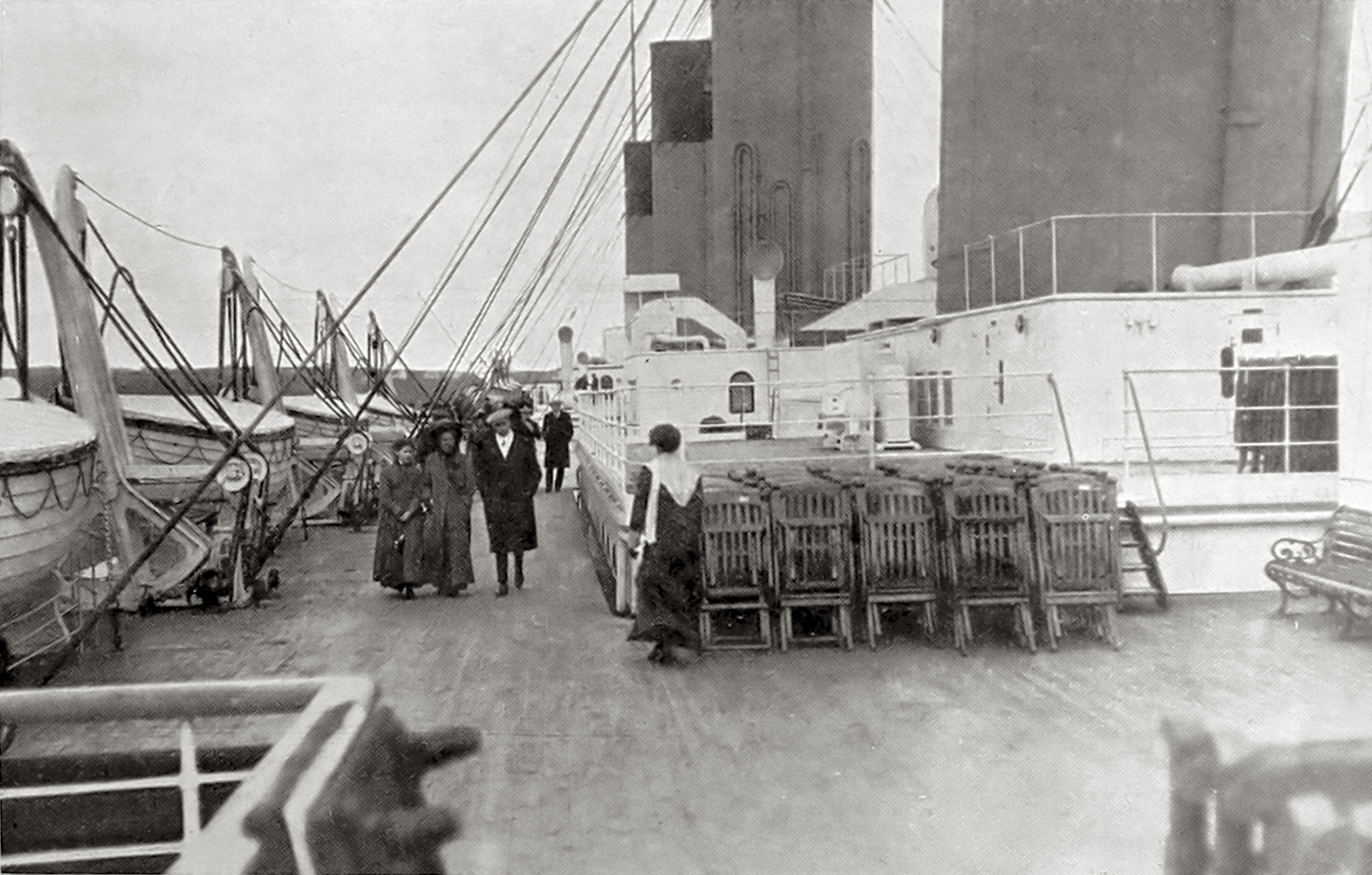
Titanic's portside Second-Class boat deck, with Lifeboat No. 14 being seen as the second Lifeboat from the left.

One of 14 clinker lifeboats which were equipped aboard Titanic, lifeboat No. 14 was located on the portside of the boat deck between lifeboats No. 12 and 16. And on 15 April 1912, after Titanic had struck an iceberg and began to sink, the lifeboat was uncovered and swung over the side on her davits, ready to be filled and launched.

== Sinking ==
Chief Officer Henry Wilde, Second Officer Charles Lightoller, Fifth Officer Harold Lowe and Sixth Officer James Moody oversaw the loading of the lifeboat and only allowed women and children to board the lifeboat. After the lifeboat had been filled with about 20 women and children, a group of men tried to rush the boat, which prompted the officers to threaten to shoot any man who put his foot into the lifeboat. After successfully subduing the effort to seize the boat, No. 14 was filled up with more women and children before Lowe called for volunteers in the crowd who could row. A few crewmen volunteered and were allowed to enter the lifeboat, before Lowe also ordered Second-Class passenger Charles Williams to man an oar in the lifeboat.

As the lifeboat seemed almost filled to capacity, Lowe asked Able Seaman Joseph Scarrott how many occupants it had. Scarrott answered that it held as many as he could count and that the boat was able to stand the weight of those on board. Following this, Lowe prepared to lower the boat, but having already launched five lifeboats before No. 14 without a ship's officer taking command of one, Lowe decided that an officer should take command of Lifeboat No. 14. He asked Sixth Officer Moody which one of them should take command of the boat, and Moody told Lowe to take No. 14 and that he would get in another boat. So Lowe took command of Lifeboat No. 14 and gave the order to launch it at about 1.30 am. Lowe later testified that two men tried to jump into the boat, of which one succeeded but was quickly thrown back onto the Titanic by Lowe. Because Lowe feared that more men would jump into the boat, which could possibly capsize the lifeboat or could result in the falls snapping due to the increased weight, he took out his revolver and fired a warning shot either alongside the ship or in the water below as to avoid hitting anyone. Lowe then noticed many men were gathered alongside the open promenade decks of A deck and B deck and subsequently fired another two shots, one for each open deck they passed, to keep the crowd back and prevent any more men from jumping into the lifeboat. Afterwards, Lowe put the gun in his pocket with the safety catch on as the boat was lowered further down. However, The lifeboat's block and tackle had gotten twisted while it was about 5 feet (1.5 meters) above the water. Lowe, after asking advice from Able seaman Joseph Scarrot, then proceeded to "slip" the lifeboat, which dropped the rest of the way into the ocean.

=== Launch ===
After the lifeboat's successful launch, Lowe ordered to row away from the sinking Titanic to avoid any possible suction, but to stay nearby so they would be close enough to pick any swimmers up that came by and immediately return. However, passengers in the boat protested against his plan and Lowe ordered the boat pulled away a little further. The lifeboat got about 150 yards (137 meters) away from the Titanic and Scarrott could make out that four other lifeboats were near No. 14's position in the dark. Lowe also ordered any crewmember or passenger with tobacco and matchsticks to hand them over to him, reasoning that tobacco smoking would have led to thirst and, with limited supply of provisions and no guarantee of rescue, this would ration what they had.

The occupants of Lifeboat No. 14 then watched on as Titanic entered its final plunge, with several people on the lifeboat stating later that they had witnessed the Titanic breaking in two. Lowe later testified that the whole ordeal was very dark as Titanic's lights had cut out about five minutes before the stern slipped beneath the waves, and that he had only heard about four explosions coming from the sinking liner. During this time, Lowe collected and managed to assemble nearby lifeboats together (Lifeboats No. 4, No. 10, No. 12 and Collapsible D) and asked them who was in charge of the boats and if they had any officers aboard them. When every lifeboat stated that they did not have any officers with them, Lowe said that they were now under his command and to stay with his boat. After that, Lowe ordered the boats to be tied up together by their painters, head and tail, so as to make the lifeboats more visible to any rescue ship and be able to stick together better.

Lowe then proceeded to order all the people of his lifeboat, to be distributed over the other boats so that he could go back in search of any survivors from the water. Lowe asked each boat how many people were in them, so he could transfer as many people in them as there were still empty seats before moving on to the next lifeboat. During the transfer of passengers, Saloon Steward George Crow noticed that Lifeboat No. 14 seemed to have sprung a leak and was taking in water. A lady in the boat had brought awareness to the issue as she had felt water coming over her ankles, and two men alongside the woman were bailing out the water over the sides. Also during the distributing of passengers, Lowe noticed a passenger with a shawl who was in a great hurry to get into the other lifeboat, so he grabbed them and pulled off the shawl and discovered it was a man who had disguised himself as a woman. Without saying a word, he proceeded to toss the man into the fore part of another lifeboat. (Note: It is not clear who this man was. It is speculated that it was either Daniel Buckley or Edward Ryan, both third class Irish passengers and both of whom admitted in letters to friends and family to having snuck into a lifeboat wearing a shawl over their head. It is more like to have been Buckley whose accounts note about shots he heard which tallies with the warning shots Lowe fired to prevent a rush towards No. 14.)

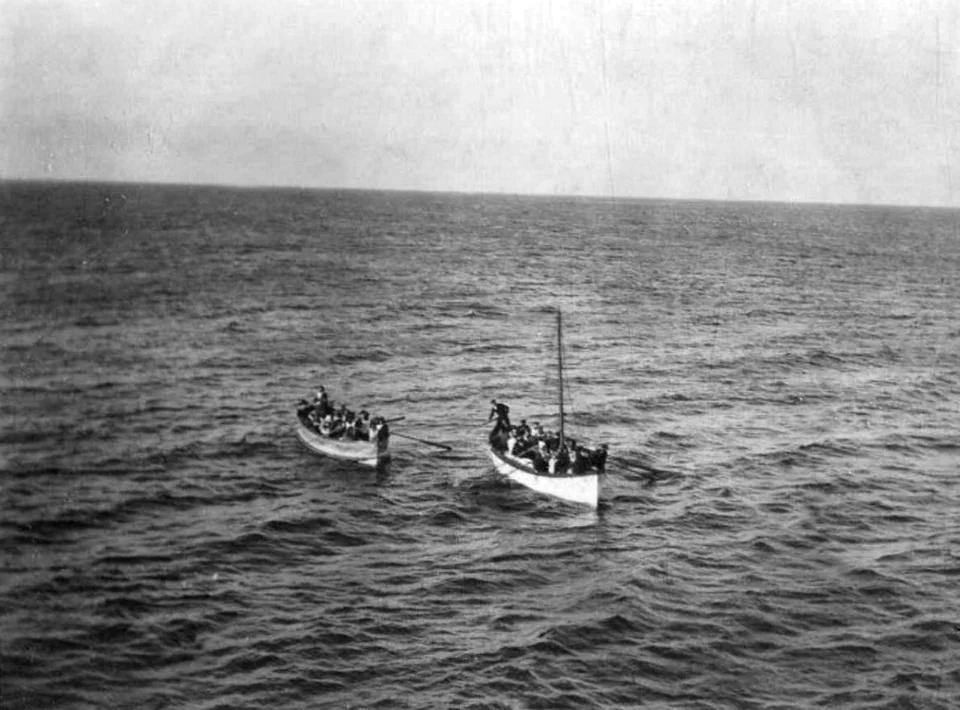
Lifeboat No. 14 with Collapsible D in tow; Lowe can be seen controlling the tiller of No. 14

=== Return to wrecksite ===
After the passengers were distributed among the other lifeboats, Lowe asked for any seamen to join him in going back to look for survivors. Lowe had managed to assemble a crew of seven men to return with him:

- Able seaman Joseph Scarrott
- Bathroom steward Frank Morris
- Saloon steward George Crow
- Second-class passenger Charles Williams
- Leading fireman Thomas Threlfall
- Able seaman Frank Evans
- Able seaman Edward Buly

Though there have been claims by some passengers that they returned with the lifeboat to the wrecksite, Lowe and two others who made up the crew of the boat testified under oath they transferred out all the passengers with the exception of Williams who volunteered to stay and row. At the British inquiry, Lowe stated, "it would be no good me going back with a load of people" who could not do anything to help.

Lowe decided to wait until the yells and shrieks had subsided, as he feared being swamped if he returned too early. It is not clear how long he waited, with Lowe stating he had not kept note of time, but it appears he began transferring passengers to other boats soon after the ship sank in preparation to return. Several eyewitnesses in the flotilla noted that Lowe wished to return to pick up survivors as soon as possible but, after passengers under his care protested against his plan, he began to redistribute them and it took longer than he had anticipated and had to yell at passengers to hurry as the noises began dying down faster than he realised.

After completing the transfer of passengers to other boats, the boat arrived at the wreck site by 3:00 A.M. and could hear moaning from the water. The crew discovered a man wearing a lifebelt nearby and had great difficulty hauling the large gentleman aboard. Once in the lifeboat, they propped the man up at the stern of the boat and took off his collar and loosened his shirt so he could get more air. However, the man was bleeding from the mouth and nose and did not regain consciousness. Not even when Saloon steward George Crow tried to move the man's limbs and rubbed his chest to restore his warmth, and the man later died and was identified as First-Class passenger William Fisher Hoyt. As they neared the center of the wreckage, Able seaman Frank Oliver Evans stated to seeing between 150 and 200 bodies between the debris and that all were wearing lifebelts. Able seaman Edward Buly proceeded to turn over some of the bodies to see if any were still alive, but could quickly see that they were dead and appeared to be frozen.

As the bodies were floating close to each other between the debris, the men in Lifeboat No. 14 found it difficult to proceed through the mass as they could not row but had to rather push their way through the mass of bodies. Saloon steward George Crow noted how at the centre of the wrecksite, they spotted a man sitting on a piece of wooden debris that was calling out to them. It took a considerable effort to reach the man due to the mass of bodies and debris around the lifeboat, but were able to get close enough to the man to extend an oar out to the man for him to grab. The crew eventually got the man into the lifeboat, but the man was very cold and his hands were stiff. He was identified as Second-Class steward Harold Phillimore and he recovered enough throughout the night to survive his ordeal. Later, Lifeboat No. 14 came across Chinese Third-Class passenger Fang Lang floating on a door. He was pulled into the lifeboat and proceeded to help row the boat with the crew. A fourth man was reported to have been recovered from the water and to have thus survived, but the name of this person is not entirely certain. It is possible that the last man to be pulled out of the icy water alive by Lifeboat No. 14, was Second Class passenger Emilio Ilario Giuseppe Portaluppi or First Class passenger Robert Williams Daniel, both of whom claimed to have been picked up from the water.

=== Collapsible boats and Carpathia ===
As daylight broke, the crew of Lifeboat No. 14 spotted Collapsible D which had fallen behind as the other lifeboats in Lowe's flotilla had separated in order to row towards the rescue ship RMS Carpathia which had arrived on the scene to rescue Titanic's survivors. Lowe pulled his lifeboat up besides them and asked if they needed to be towed. The people in Collapsible D accepted his offer, whereupon Lowe erected Lifeboat No. 14's sail and took the Collapsible in tow towards the Carpathia. As the lifeboats sailed towards their rescue ship, they spotted the waterlogged Collapsible Boat A with around a dozen survivors still aboard it. Able Seamen Evans and Scarott both stated that Lowe fired three or four warning shots into the water and warned the people on the waterlogged Collapsible not to rush his boat. Lifeboat No. 14 ultimately picked up 12 to 14 survivors from Collapsible A.

The lifeboats reached the Carpathia by 7.15 am and all aboard were rescued. The body of William Fisher Hoyt was brought aboard the Carpathia and buried at sea on 16 April. After all her occupants were safely aboard Carpathia, Lifeboat No. 14 was set adrift alongside six other lifeboats of the Titanic as Carpathia didn't have the room to recover all 20 of Titanic's lifeboats. The lifeboat was never seen again.

== Occupants ==
This is a list of known passengers and crew who were saved by Lifeboat No. 14.

- First Class passenger
- Second Class passenger
- Third Class passenger
- Crew member

Name	Age	Class/Dept	Notes
Brown, Mrs. Elizabeth Catherine (née Ford)	44	Second Class	South African woman who was emigrating to the United States with her husband and daughter to settle in Seattle. Her husband did not survive the sinking. She died in 1925.
Brown, Miss Edith Eileen	15	Second Class	South African girl who was emigrating to the United States with her parents to settle in Seattle. Her father did not survive the sinking. She died in 1997.
Cameron, Miss Clear Annie	35	Second Class	British woman who was emigrating to the United States with her friend Nellie Wallcroft. She died in 1962.
Clarke, Mrs. Ada Maria	28	Second Class	British woman who was emigrating to the United States with her husband to settle in San Francisco. Her husband did not survive the sinking. She died in 1953.
Collyer, Mrs. Charlotte Annie (née Tate)	30	Second Class	British woman who was emigrating to the United States with her husband and daughter to settle in Idaho. Her husband did not survive the sinking. She died in 1916.
Collyer, Miss Marjorie Charlotte "Lottie"	8	Second Class	British girl who was emigrating to the United States with her parents to settle in Idaho. Her father did not survive the sinking. She died in 1965.
Compton, Mrs. Mary Eliza (née Ingersoll)	64	First Class	American woman who was returning to the United States with her daughter and son. Her son did not survive the sinking. She died in 1930.
Compton, Miss Sara Rebecca "Sadie"	39	First Class	American woman who was returning to the United States with her mother and brother. Her brother did not survive the sinking. She died in 1952.
Cook, Mrs. Selena (née Rogers)	22	Second Class	British woman who was travelling to the United States to visit her mother in New York. She died in 1964.
Crow, Mr. George Frederick	26	Victualling Crew	Saloon Steward who returned to the wrecksite with Fifth Officer Lowe to search for survivors. He died in 1960.
Davies, Mrs. Elizabeth Agnes Mary (née White)	48	Second Class	British woman who was emigrating to the United States with her two sons to join her eldest son and his wife in Michigan. The oldest of her two sons on board did not survive the sinking. She died in 1933.
Davies, Master John Morgan Jr.	8	Second Class	British boy who was emigrating to the United States with his mother and brother to join his eldest brother and sister-in-law in Michigan. His brother did not survive the sinking. He died in 1951.
Harder, Mr. William	39	Deck Crew	Window cleaner. He died in 1947.
Harris, Mr. Frederick	39	Engineering Crew	Fireman.
Hart, Mrs. Esther Ada (née Bloomfield)	48	Second Class	British woman who was emigrating to Canada with her husband and daughter to settle in Winnipeg. Her husband did not survive the sinking. She died in 1928.
Hart, Miss Eva Miriam	7	Second Class	British girl who was emigrating to Canada with her parents to settle in Winnipeg. Her father did not survive the sinking. She died in 1996.
Ilett, Miss Bertha	17	Second Class	Channel Islander woman who was travelling to the United States to visit her family in New York. She died in 1976.
Lemore, Mrs. Amelia "Milley" (née Hunt)	46	Second Class	British woman who was returning to the United States. She died in 1950.
Lowe, Mr. Harold Godfrey, RNR	29	Officers	Fifth Officer of the Titanic. Lowered and took command of this lifeboat before returning to look for more survivors after the ship had gone down. He died in 1944.
Mellinger, Mrs. Elizabeth Anne (née Maidment)	42	Second Class	British woman who was emigrating to the United States with her daughter after finding a job as a housekeeper in Vermont. She died in 1962.
Mellinger, Miss Madeleine Violet	13	Second Class	British girl who was emigrating to the United States with her mother after she found a job as a housekeeper in Vermont. She died in 1976.
Minahan, Mrs. Lillian E. (née Thorpe)	37	First Class	American woman who was returning to the United States with her husband and sister-in-law after a visit to their ancestral Ireland. Her husband did not survive the sinking. She died in 1962.
Minahan, Miss Daisy E.	33	First Class	American woman who was returning to the United States with her brother and sister-in-law after a visit to their ancestral Ireland. Her brother did not survive the sinking. She died in 1919.
Moor, Mrs. Beila	29	Third Class	Russian woman who was emigrating to the United States with her son to settle in Chicago. She died in 1958.
Moor, Master Meier	7	Third Class	Russian boy who was emigrating to the United States with his mother to settle in Chicago. He died in 1975.
Morris, Mr. Frank Herbert	28	Victualling Crew	First-Class Bathroom Steward who returned to the wrecksite with Fifth Officer Lowe to search for survivors.
Pugh, Mr. Alfred	20	Victualling Crew	Third-Class Steward. He died in 1962.
Scarrott, Mr. Joseph George	33	Deck Crew	Able Seaman who returned to the wrecksite with Fifth Officer Lowe to search for survivors. He died in 1938.
Tannous, Mrs. Thamini Khoury Fa'ud "Thelma"	16	Third Class	Syrian woman who was emigrating to the United States with her son and brother-in-law to settle in Pennsylvania. Her son was rescued in another lifeboat after being separated, but her brother-in-law did not survive the sinking. She died in 1974.
Threlfall, Mr. Thomas	38	Engineering Crew	Leading Fireman who returned to the wrecksite with Fifth Officer Lowe to search for survivors. He died in 1934.
Wallcroft, Miss Ellen "Nellie"	36	Second Class	British woman who was emigrating to the United States with her friend Clear Annie Cameron. She died in 1949.
Wells, Mrs. Addie Dart (née Trevaskis)	29	Second Class	British woman who was emigrating to the United States with her son and daughter to join her husband and brother in Akron. She died in 1954.
Wells, Miss Joan	4	Second Class	British girl who was emigrating to the United States with her mother and brother to join her father and uncle in Akron. She died in 1933.
Wells, Master Ralph Lester	2	Second Class	British boy who was emigrating to the United States with his mother and sister to join his father and uncle in Akron. He died in 1972.
Williams, Mr. Charles Eugene	23	Second Class	British sportsman who was travelling to the United States to defend his racket title against George E. Standing. He was one of the men who returned to the wrecksite with Fifth Officer Lowe to search for survivors. He died in 1935.

=== Saved from the water ===
This is a list of known passengers and crew who were saved by Lifeboat No. 14 after returning to the wrecksite.

- First Class passenger
- Third Class passenger
- Crew member

Name	Age	Class/Dept	Notes
Hoyt, Mr. William Fisher	43	First Class	American businessman who was returning to the United States following a business trip. He was rescued from the water but died not long after.
Lang, Mr Fang	17	Third Class	Chinese seaman who was travelling to New York City with eight colleagues to join the Donald Line's steamship Annetta as a fireman. He died in 1986.
Phillimore, Mr. Harold Charles William	23	Victualling Crew	Second-Class Saloon Steward. He died in 1967.

== In popular culture ==
Lifeboat No. 14 is first shown in the 1958 film A Night to Remember and depicts a hysterical woman who does not want to be parted from her husband, who is then taken away from him by force by a crewman and shoved towards the lifeboat, prompting the woman to fall in the gap between the boat deck and the lifeboat. She can grasp the side of the lifeboat just in time and continues to scream as other men help her into the lifeboat. Some other Third-Class women then board the lifeboat under the supervision of Second Officer Lightoller (Kenneth More) and the lifeboat is then lowered with Fifth Officer Lowe (Howard Pays) in command. After the Titanic has gone down, Lifeboat No. 14 is shown in a flotilla with two other lifeboats with Fifth Officer Lowe taking command and saying that he'll go back to rescue survivors from the water, before ordering the women to transfer into the other lifeboats. A man shouts at Lowe that they do not have any more room, to which Lowe replies that the other lifeboat has room for nearly 20 more and that the man must follow his orders. As Lowe assist in helping the women transfer into the other lifeboats, an older woman complains to Lowe before he spots a woman with a shawl around her head. Lowe takes off the shawl, revealing that it was actually a man who had disguised himself as a woman, prompting him to give the man a dirty look before shoving him into the other lifeboat.

Lifeboat No. 14 is also featured in the 1996 Titanic miniseries, where it gets ample amount of screentime as two of the main characters escape the Titanic on it. Fictional Danish Third-Class passenger Aase Ludvigsen (Sonsee Neu) is placed in the lifeboat by her love interest and fellow Third-Class passenger Jamie Perse (Mike Doyle). The fictional First Class Bedroom Steward Simon Doonan (Tim Curry) also boards Lifeboat No. 14, but does so disguised as an Arabic woman. Fictional First-Class passenger Isabella Paradine (Catherine Zeta-Jones) also boards the lifeboat after repeated pleeds by her lover Wynn Park (Peter Gallagher) to do so without him as he is not allowed on. As the lifeboat under Fifth Officer Lowe's (Kavan Smith) command rows away from the sinking Titanic, its occupants stare in disbelief at the Titanic's final plunge. After Titanic has sunk, Miss Ludvigsen and Miss Paradine plead with Fifth Officer Lowe to go back and save people from the water. Lowe agrees, but the disguised Steward Simon Doonan shouts at them that they'll be swamped if they return, blowing his cover. Miss Ludvigsen confronts Doonan as he had raped her moments before Titanic struck the iceberg, prompting Doonan to hit her causing her to fall overboard. As the passengers and Fifth Officer Lowe want to help Miss Ludvigsen, Doonan pulls out a gun and orders everyone back to their places. Miss Paradine insults him while Fifth Officer Lowe continues to try and help Miss Ludvigsen. Doonan yells at them to sit back down before Fifth Officer Lowe takes an oar and hits Doonan over the head with it, killing him and causing his body to fall overboard. After that, the people in Lifeboat No. 14 quickly save Miss Ludvigsen from the water. Fifth Officer Lowe suggest to wait a bit before returning to rescue people, prompting their arrival to be in vain as they find no one left alive. The portrayal of Lifeboat No. 14 in the miniseries is almost entirely fictional and holds little historical accuracy to the real events.

In the 1997 film Titanic, Lifeboat No. 14 is first shown being filled with women and children by Second Officer Lightoller (Jonathan Phillips) and Fifth Officer Lowe (Ioan Gruffudd), as they struggle to hold back a large crowd of men. In the chaos, a woman is pushed over Titanic's side and is just able to catch herself on the lifeboat's gunwale. As she screams for help, a seaman tries to hold back the men with the lifeboat's wooden tiller before the woman is saved by being pulled onto the A deck promenade by a helping man. This incident prompts Second Officer Lightoller to brandish his gun and order the men back, threatening that he will shoot them like dogs if they do not keep order. After the crowd backs away, Second Officer Lightoller orders Fifth Officer Lowe to take command of Lifeboat No. 14. The lifeboat is shortly after being shown lowering away when it passes the promenade decks which are filled with people trying to jump on the lifeboat. Fifth Officer Lowe orders them all to stay back, brandishing his gun, before firing three rapid shots out to sea over the heads of the lifeboat's occupants to hold the men back.

The next time Lifeboat No. 14 features in the film, is only after the Titanic has sunk. It shows Lifeboat No. 14 grouping up with Lifeboats No. 10, 12 and Collapsible D with Lowe ordering the crewmen to tie up the boats together. Fifth Officer Lowe looks back as he hears all the cries coming from those dying in the water, and filled with determination, tells the people in the boats that they have to go back. So Lowe orders the women in the boat the transfer to the other boats, so that he can create more space to rescue those in the water. Lifeboat No. 14 is shown shortly after, arriving at the wrecksite with only Lowe and six more crewmen aboard. Fifth Officer Lowe orders the crew at the front to check if the people in the water are still alive. They only encounter dead bodies, causing Lowe to shout Is there anyone alive out there, hearing no response. Lowe orders to head deeper in the mass of bodies, telling his crew to be careful to not hit the bodies in the water with their oars as the men in front push the people out of the path of the lifeboat. Lowe then spots a mother and her baby dead in the water, prompting him to admit that they have waited too long to return, but does not give up and orders the men to keep searching for survivors while he shouts if anyone in the water can hear him. Another deleted scene shows the rescue of Third-Class passenger Fang Lang, who kept himself adrift on a piece of wooden debris and is hauled into the boat, where he is quickly covered with a blanket and kept warm on the orders of Fifth Officer Lowe. As Rose DeWitt Bukater (Kate Winslet) lies on a piece of wooden wreckage, staring at the stars, she notices a light before turning her head and noticing Lifeboat No. 14 rowing by while Lowe still shouts for any survivors to make themselves known. As Rose tries to wake up her love interest Jack Dawson (Leonardo DiCaprio) with the news that a boat is there to rescue them, she finds out that he has already died of hypothermia and initially lies back down on the wood she is floating on, contempt to die alongside the love of her life. As the boat rows away and Rose awaits her death, she suddenly remembers her last promise to Jack, to never give up and never let go of life. This causes her to call out to the lifeboat to come back, but weakened by the cold, her voice is not loud enough to be heard by Lowe or his men. The men on Lifeboat No. 14 suggest to Lowe that there are no more survivors to be rescued, causing them to start rowing away as Rose still tries to call them back. Realising the men in Lifeboat No. 14 do not hear her, Rose lets go of Jack's hand and says she will always honour her promise to him before letting him go. She crawls off her wooden debris and lands back in the icy water, after which she struggles to swim to the body of Chief Officer Wilde (Mark Lindsay Chapman). She takes the whistle from his mouth and uses it to successfully attract the attention of Lowe and his men. He orders his men to come about and make way to rescue Rose. Lifeboat No. 14 is shown one final time in the movie, and shows Rose lying in the boat wrapped in a blanket while Fifth Officer Lowe uses green flares to attract the attention of the rescue ship RMS Carpathia before the lifeboat rows to the steamer and all aboard her are rescued. The only two historical errors in the depiction of Lifeboat No. 14 in the 1997 film, is that Lowe was not the one to use the green roman candles to signal the Carpathia. This was in reality done by Fourth Officer Boxhall in Emergency Lifeboat No. 2. Fifth Officer Lowe did not possess a flashlight during the night of the sinking, and had to search for survivors in the dark.

== See also ==
- Titanic Emergency Boat No. 1
- Titanic Lifeboat No. 6
- Titanic Collapsible Boat A
- Titanic Collapsible Boat B
- Titanic Collapsible Boat C
- Titanic Collapsible Boat D

== Bibliography ==
- Butler, Daniel Allen (1998). Unsinkable. Stackpole Books. ISBN 978-0-8117-1814-1.
- Eaton, John P.; Haas, Charles A. (1994). Titanic: Triumph and Tragedy. Patrick Stephens. ISBN 978-1-85260-493-6.
- Lord, Walter (2005) [1955]. A Night to Remember. New York: St. Martin's Griffin. ISBN 978-0-8050-7764-3.
- Wormstedt, Bill; Fitch, Tad (2011). "An Account of the Saving of Those on Board". In Halpern, Samuel (ed.). Report into the Loss of the SS Titanic: A Centennial Reappraisal. The History Press. ISBN 978-0-7524-6210-3.
- Sheil, Inger (2012). Titanic Valour: The Life of Fifth Officer Harold Lowe. The History Press. ISBN 978-0752469966.
