= HMHS Plassy =

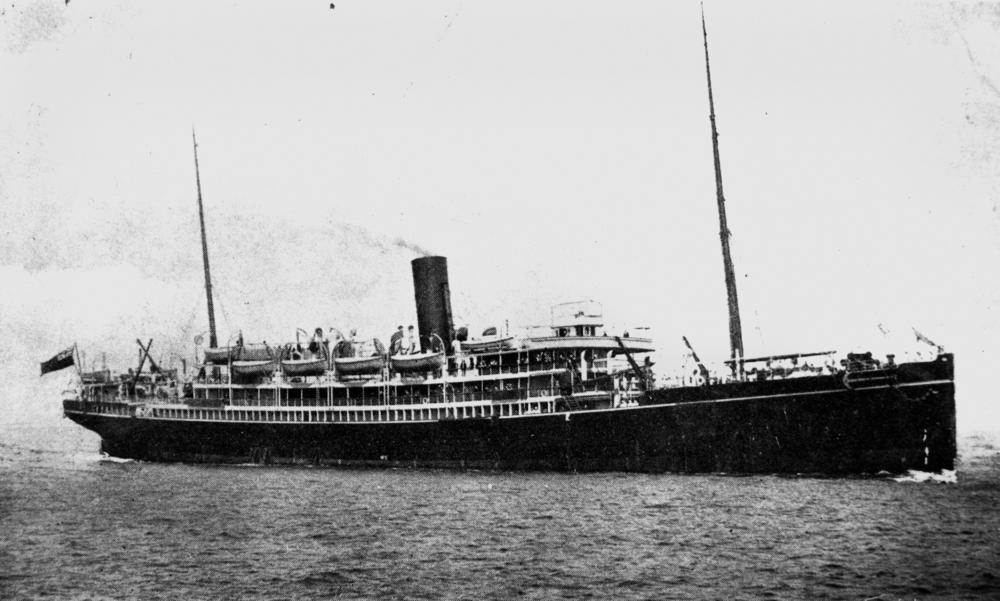
- The Plassy underway

History

United Kingdom
- Name: Plassy
- Operator: The Peninsular and Oriental Steam Navigation Company
- Builder: Caird & Company, Greenock
- Yard number: 296
- Launched: 23 November 1900
- Maiden voyage: 29 January 1901
- Fate: Scrapped 4 September 1924 at Genoa

General characteristics
- Tonnage: 7,404 GRT
- Length: 450 feet (140 m)
- Propulsion: 2 x T3 cyl (28.5, 46, 76 x 48in), 1,055 nhp, 2 × screw

HMHS Plassy (His Majesty's Hospital ship) was a steamship originally built for the Peninsular and Oriental Steam Navigation Company (P&O), which spent most of its career in government service, particularly as a troop transport for the Second Boer War and as a hospital ship in World War I, including service at the Battle of Jutland.

== Building ==
The ship was built by Caird & Company as a twin-screw steamer, capable of mail and passenger service, but also to comply with government regulations for troop ships. The specifications included a top speed of 16 knots (30 km/h; 18 mph), and accommodation for 114 first class and 57 second class passengers.

== Career ==
In 1911, the ship (then a troop transport) was fitted with wireless telegraphy.

At the Battle of Jutland, Plassy served as a hospital ship, and took on board 192 wounded from the battlecruisers HMS Lion and HMS Princess Royal, including a number with severe burns.

In June 1917, King George V visited the ship at Scapa Flow.
