= George Thomas Rowe =

RMS Titanic crew survivor

George Thomas Rowe BEM
- Born: 20 March 1881; Gosport, Hampshire, England
- Died: 14 February 1974 (aged 92); Southampton, Hampshire, England
- Known for: Last surviving Quartermaster of RMS Titanic
- Spouse: Frances Annie Reid (m. 1914)
- Children: 3

External videos
- Titanic Survivor George Rowe - BBC TV Interview (1956). on YouTube

George Thomas Rowe BEM (20 March 1881 – 14 February 1974), was a British merchant seaman and a Quartermaster on the ocean liner RMS Titanic during her maiden voyage. He survived the sinking and at the time of his death was the last surviving Quartermaster of Titanic.

== Early life ==
George Thomas Rowe was born on 20 March 1881 in Gosport, Hampshire, England as the second of eleven children of plumber Richard Rowe and Annie Groves. Rowe had five brothers and five sisters. He worked as an errand boy in his youth, before joining the Royal Navy on 10 September 1895 when he was 14 years old. Rowe was educated on the training ship HMS St Vincent before becoming an able seaman and serving on, amongst others, HMS Raleigh, HMS Duke of Wellington, HMS Excellent, HMS Vindictive, HMS Goliath and HMS Exmouth. He conducted his final voyage on HMS Dreadnought from 8 May 1909 to 19 March 1910 before being discharged with the rank of petty officer. Following his Royal Navy service, Rowe joined the merchant service and began working for the White Star Line, serving on RMS Majestic and RMS Oceanic.

== RMS Titanic ==
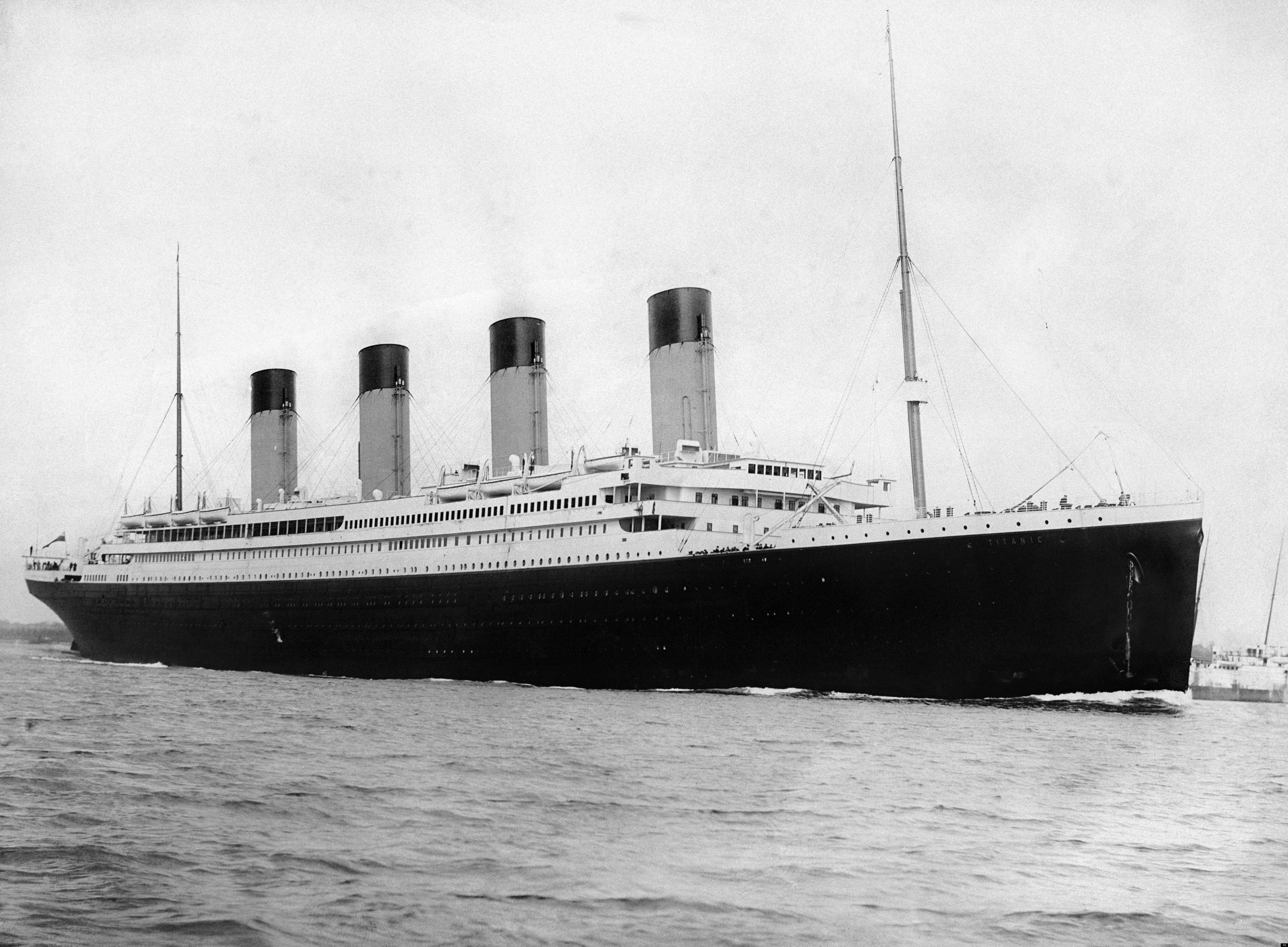
RMS Titanic departing Southampton on 10 April 1912.

In early April 1912, Rowe joined the newly acquired RMS Titanic in Belfast as a lookout for her delivery trip. He signed on again to be part of Titanic's crew on 6 April 1912 in Southampton as one of seven Quartermasters for a monthly wage of £5. Titanic departed Southampton on her maiden voyage to New York on 10 April 1912.

On 14 April 1912 at 8 pm, Rowe his watch on the poop deck and described the night as pitch black, very calm, cold and starry. As he was standing underneath the aft-bridge, Rowe felt a slight jar and immediately looked at his watch to see it was 11.40 pm. Seconds later, Rowe believed he saw a windjammer coming alongside the starboard side of Titanic. It wasn't until the object came closer that he realised it was an iceberg that he estimated to be about 30 meters (100 feet) in height. Rowe witnessed the berg passing by the starboard side of the Titanic at such a close range, that he initially feared that it would strike the aft-bridge. After the iceberg cleared the ship, Rowe went on the aft-bridge and stood by the telephone awaiting orders. However, no orders were relayed to Rowe and he remained on his post until he noticed a lifeboat (Most likely Lifeboat No. 7) in the water off the starboard side at about 0.45 am. (Note: Rowe testified in both Titanic inquiries that he spotted a lifeboat at 0.25 am, this is however unlikely as the first lifeboat to leave the Titanic (Lifeboat No. 7) wasn't launched until about 0.40 am. Therefore it's more likely that 0.45 am was the real time at which Rowe spotted the lifeboat.) After seeing this, Rowe decided to ring up the fore-bridge and asked if they knew a lifeboat had been lowered from the ship. The person on the other end of the line asked him if he was the Third Officer, to which Rowe replied that he was a Quartermaster. The person then ordered Rowe to bring the distress rockets and their detonators over to the fore-bridge. He complied and went one deck below to a locker where he took a tin box and about 12 rockets out of it. Rowe found the rockets to be fairly heavy and proceeded to bring them forwards, walking along the port side boat deck from where he could hear the ship's band playing as he passed the First class lounge. He eventually reached the bridge and handed the rockets over to Fourth Officer Boxhall. By 1 am, Captain Smith ordered Rowe and Boxhall to fire a distress rocket from the starboard bridge wing every five or six minutes, as the crew had noticed the light of a potential rescue ship on the horizon. Rowe also noticed the bright stationary white light as he was firing off the rockets and was later ordered by Captain Smith to attempt to communicate with the ship by using the port side morse lamp. Rowe and Boxhall kept firing off distress rockets until about 1.50 am without receiving a reply from the mystery ship.

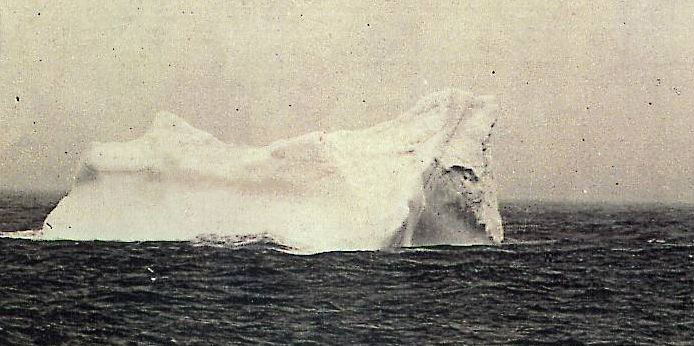
Picture of an iceberg in the vicinity of the Titanic disaster, taken by Stephan Rehorek on board SS Bremen on 20 April 1912.

As the starboard Collapsible boats were being readied near the bridge, Rowe heard Chief Officer Wilde call out for a sailor to man Collapsible C as it only held three firemen and a steward aside from women and children. Around this time, Rowe approached Captain Smith and asked if he should fire more distress rockets. Captain Smith simply replied No before ordering him to take command of Collapsible C. Rowe entered Collapsible C when it was nearly full and could only help about three women and three children enter the lifeboat before the order was given to lower the boat. Before it was lowered, Chief Officer Wilde called out one last time for women and children to come forward, but as no more were present, First class passenger William E. Carter and White Star Line chairman Bruce Ismay entered the lifeboat before it was finally lowered at 2 am with 44 of her 47 seats filled. As the Titanic was suffering with a port list by this point, the gunwale of Collapsible C was catching upon the rivets of Titanic's hull and the lifeboat's occupants had to use their hands and the boat's oars to push the Collapsible away from the sinking ship as it was lowered. Upon reaching the water, Rowe noticed that the Titanic's forward well deck had already submerged, but that her forecastle was still partly above the water.

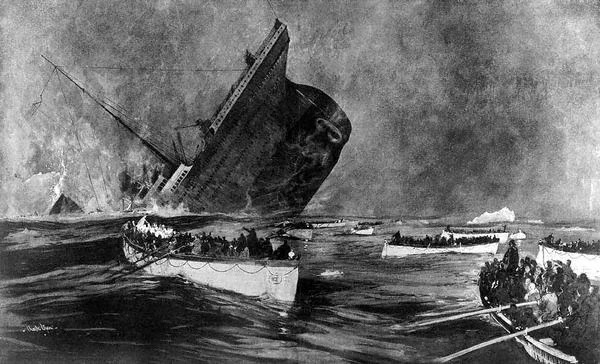
Titanic's final moments

After the lifeboat started to row away from the Titanic, Rowe ordered to head for the white light of the mystery vessel he could still see off Titanic's port bow. He estimated the light to be 5 nautical miles (9.3 km) away from them and believed it was the stern light of a sailing ship. The Collapsible made it about 3/4 nautical mile (1.5 kilometres) away from Titanic when she began her final plunge, and Rowe could hear a rumbling that he likened to a distant thunder as the liner went down. He witnessed the ship's final moments as her stern slipped beneath the waves. As the lifeboat made no headway toward the light of the mystery ship, Rowe abandoned the effort to reach it and instead set course for another lifeboat that was carrying a green light. Rowe noted how cold the night was, but saw that those in his lifeboat were very well wrapped and didn't seem to suffer from the cold. As daylight broke, Rowe witnessed how four men, who he believed to be Chinamen or Filipinos, emerged from between the seats of the lifeboat after they had stowed away during the loading of the Collapsible. Thanks to the daylight, Rowe also noticed the rescueship RMS Carpathia arriving and his Collapsible reached the steamer at 5.45 am.

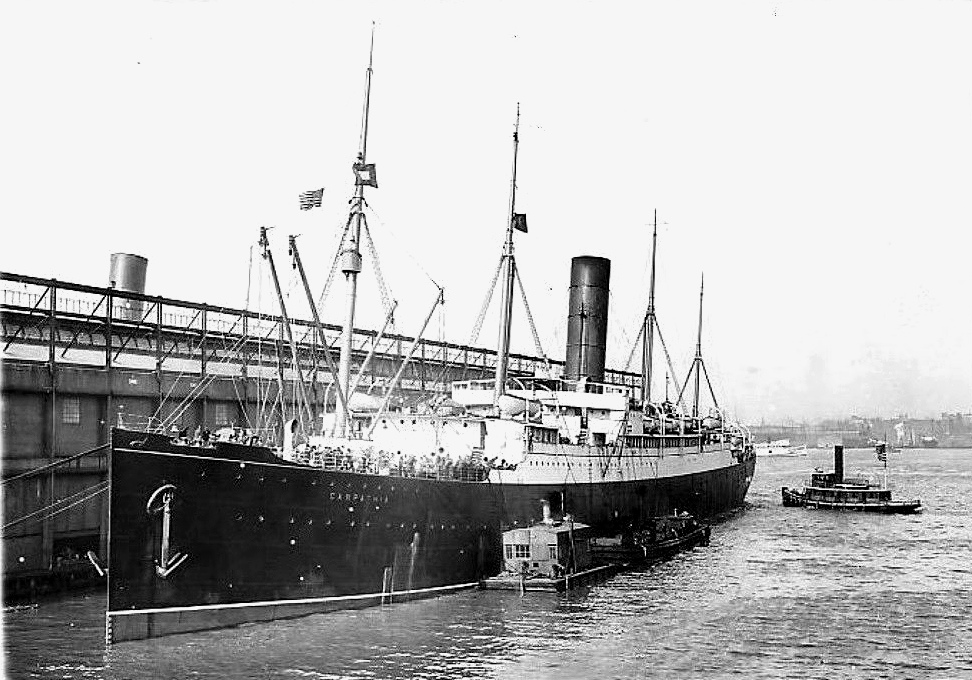
RMS Carpathia in New York on 18 April 1912

Carpathia arrived in New York on 18 April 1912 with all of Titanic's survivors and Rowe was called upon to testify at the United States Senate inquiry into the sinking of the Titanic on 25 April 1912 before returning to the United Kingdom, where he testified again at the British Wreck Commissioner's inquiry into the sinking of the Titanic on 24 May 1912.

== Later life ==
Rowe married Frances Annie Reid in 1914 and the couple went on to have three children. At the outbreak of the First World War in 1914, Rowe served in the Grand Fleet and joined the crew of the hospital ship HMHS Plassy. In 1915, he began working at the shipbuilding firm Thornycroft in Southampton. As public interest into the Titanic disaster resurged in the 1950s, Rowe wrote a letter to Walter Lord in 1955 to help him with his book about the sinking of the Titanic. Rowe was also interviewed by the BBC on 27 November 1956 alongside fellow Titanic survivors. Among the persons attending this survivor reunion for the BBC interview were First Class passenger Edith Rosenbaum, Second Class Smoke Room Steward James William Witter, Third Class passenger Gus Cohen, Fireman Wally Hurst and Carpathia wireless operator Harold Cottam. Rowe was awarded the British Empire Medal for his tenure at Thornycroft in 1960.

== Death and legacy ==
Rowe died aged 92 on 14 February 1974 in Southampton, Hampshire, England, after having outlived two of his children. At the time of his death, he was the last surviving Quartermaster of the Titanic. Rowe was interred in the Holy Saviour Churchyard in an unmarked grave.

Rowe is featured in the 1958 film A Night to Remember and was portrayed by Cyril Chamberlain. In the movie, he is shown firing off distress rockets to alert the Californian before being ordered into Collapsible C by First Officer Murdoch. This last event is however incorrect, as in reality, Rowe was ordered into Collapsible C by Captain Smith and not First Officer Murdoch. In the 1997 James Cameron film Titanic, Rowe is portrayed by Richard Graham and features in several scenes. He is first seen in the movie talking to some able seaman on the aft well deck before they react to Rose's (Kate Winslet) screams for help as she nearly falls off the stern, being barely caught and saved by Jack (Leonardo DiCaprio). As Rowe and his mates arrive at the scene, they misunderstand Jack's rescue of Rose as an attempted assault on her and Rowe orders Jack to stand back before he instructs his fellow sailors to fetch the Master-At-Arms.

=== Portrayals ===
- Cyril Chamberlain (1958) - A Night to Remember
- Richard Graham (1997) - Titanic
- Mackenzie Scott (2012) - Titanic: Case Closed

== Sources ==
- Barratt, Nick (2009). Lost Voices From the Titanic: The Definitive Oral History. London: Random House. ISBN 978-1-84809-151-1.
- Bartlett, W. B. (2011). Titanic: 9 Hours to Hell, the Survivors' Story. Stroud, Gloucestershire: Amberley Publishing. ISBN 978-1-4456-0482-4.
- Butler, Daniel Allen (1998). Unsinkable: the full story of the RMS Titanic. Mechanicsburg, PA: Stackpole Books. ISBN 978-0-8117-1814-1.
- Eaton, John P.; Haas, Charles A. (1994). Titanic: Triumph and Tragedy. Wellingborough, UK: Patrick Stephens. ISBN 978-1-85260-493-6.
- Eaton, John P.; Haas, Charles A. (1995). Titanic: Triumph and Tragedy. New York: W.W. Norton & Company. ISBN 978-0-393-03697-8.
