= Crew of the Titanic =

Crew of liner that sank in April 1912

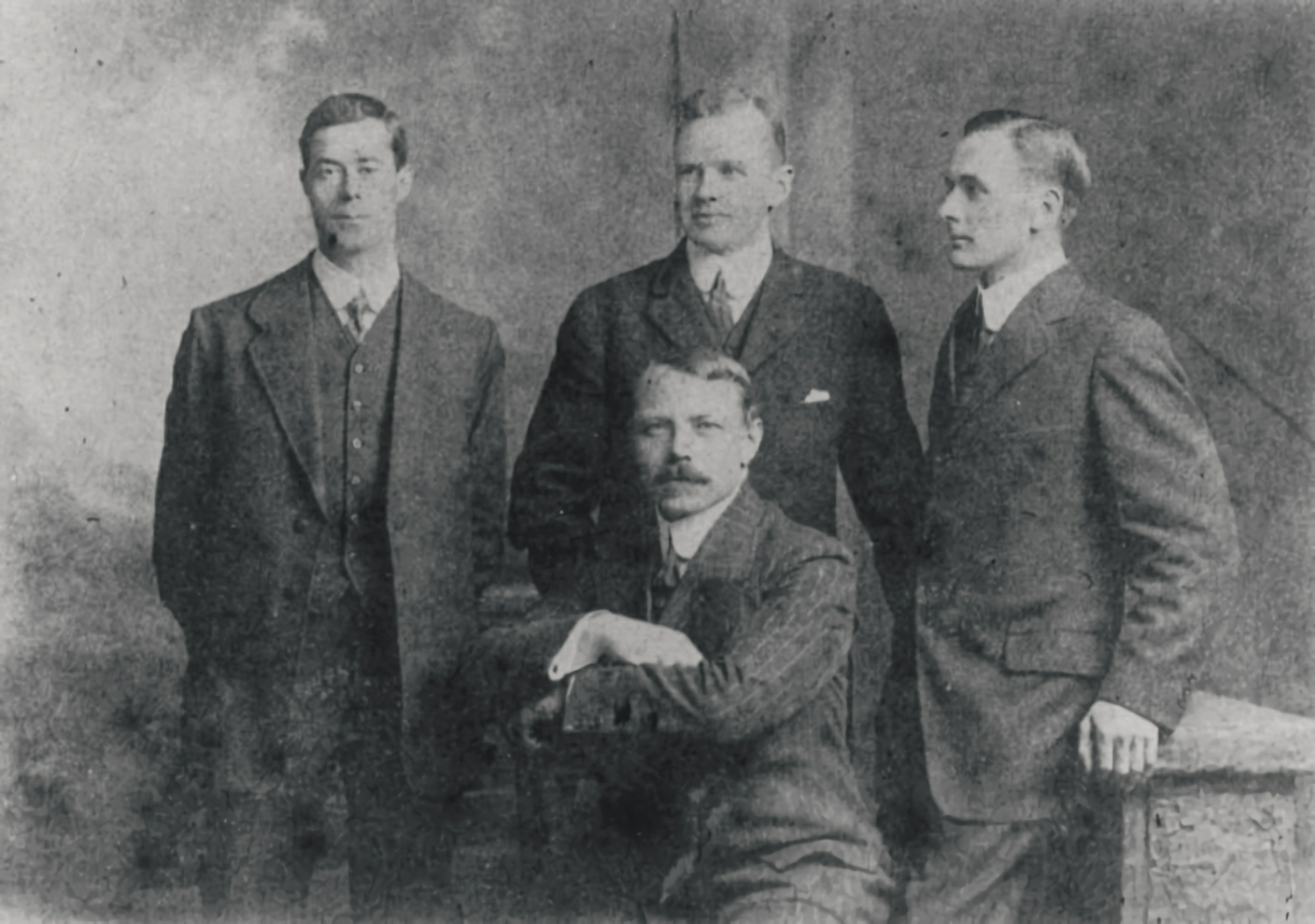
RMS Titanic's four surviving officers in May 1912. From left to right: Fifth Officer Harold Lowe, Second Officer Charles Lightoller, Fourth Officer Joseph Boxhall; Third Officer Herbert Pitman, seated

The RMS Titanic sailed with an approximate 891 crew on its maiden voyage of the second of the White Star Line's Olympic-class ocean liners, from Southampton, England, to New York City, United States. (Note: In Queenstown, a fireman named John Coffey, a Queenstown native, deserted the ship by sneaking onto one of the tenders and hiding under mail bags being transported to shore. If included, the number of crew on the maiden voyage would be 892.) Halfway through the voyage, the ship struck an iceberg and sank in the early morning of 15 April 1912, resulting in the deaths of 1,496 people, including 679 crew members.

== Crew ==
Breakdown of casualties according to the British Board of Trade report (click for detail). Crew members are in blue

The following is a full list of known crew members who sailed on the maiden voyage of the RMS Titanic.

Included in this list are the eight members of the ship's band, who were given passenger accommodations and treated as both passengers and crew. Also included are the nine members of the Guarantee Group who, though not considered crew, were aboard to make notes about the ship and assist the crew in case an issue arose with the brand liner. Both are included in the list of passengers on board RMS Titanic.

Crew members are colour-coded, indicating whether they were saved or perished.
The crew member did not survive
The crew member survived

Survivors are listed with the lifeboat from which they were known to be rescued by the RMS Carpathia, on 15 April 1912.

Victims whose remains were recovered after the sinking are listed with a superscript next to the body number, indicating the recovery vessel:

- MB – CS Mackay-Bennett (bodies 1–306)
- M – CS Minia (bodies 307–323)
- MM – CGS Montmagny (bodies 326–329)
- A – SS Algerine (body 330)
- O – RMS Oceanic (bodies 331–333)
- I – SS Ilford (body 334)
- OT – SS Ottawa (body 335)

Numbers 324 and 325 were unused, and the six bodies buried at sea by the Carpathia also went unnumbered. Several recovered bodies were unidentifiable and thus not all numbers are matched with a person.

Upon recovery, the bodies of 209 identified and unidentified victims of the sinking were brought to Halifax, Nova Scotia. Of those, 121 were taken to the non-denominational Fairview Lawn Cemetery, 59 were repatriated, 19 were buried in the Roman Catholic Mount Olivet Cemetery, and 10 were taken to the Jewish Baron de Hirsch Cemetery. The bodies of the remaining recovered victims were either delivered to family members or buried at sea.

The "Hometown" field may be misleading. Many crews had secondary or temporary addresses in Southampton, which they gave when signing the crew list, and others may have only recently relocated there. In particular, the number of crew from Merseyside is understated; for example, Chief Engineer Joseph Bell and Chief Steward Andrew Latimer lived with their families in the Liverpool area. Dr. Alan Scarth, in his book Titanic and Liverpool, identifies 115 crew members with close connections to the city, of whom only 28 survived.

=== Officers ===
Along with the captain, who was in complete charge of the ship, Titanic had a complement of seven officers. Three of these were senior officers who stood four-hour watches with eight hours off. The remaining four were junior officers who stood four-hour watches with four hours off, with additional two-hour dog-watches on alternating days. Along with one senior officer who stood as Officer of the Watch on the bridge, there would be two junior officers on watch doing various duties.

Officers
Name	Age	Hometown	Boarded	Position	Lifeboat	Body
Smith, Commander Edward John, RNR	62	Southampton, Hampshire, England	Belfast	Captain		
Wilde, Lieutenant Henry Tingle, RNR	39	Liverpool, Lancashire, England	Southampton	Chief Officer		
Murdoch, Lieutenant William McMaster, RNR	39	Dalbeattie, Kirkcudbrightshire, Scotland	Belfast	First Officer		
Lightoller, Sub-Lieutenant Charles Herbert, RNR	38	Netley, Hampshire, England	Belfast	Second Officer	B	
Pitman, Mr. Herbert John	34	Castle Cary, Somerset, England	Belfast	Third Officer	5	
Boxhall, Sub-Lieutenant Joseph Groves, RNR	28	Hull, Yorkshire, England	Belfast	Fourth Officer	2	
Lowe, Mr. Harold Godfrey, RNR	29	Barmouth, Merionethshire, Wales	Belfast	Fifth Officer	14	
Moody, Mr. James Paul	24	Grimsby, Lincolnshire, England	Belfast	Sixth Officer		

=== Deck ===
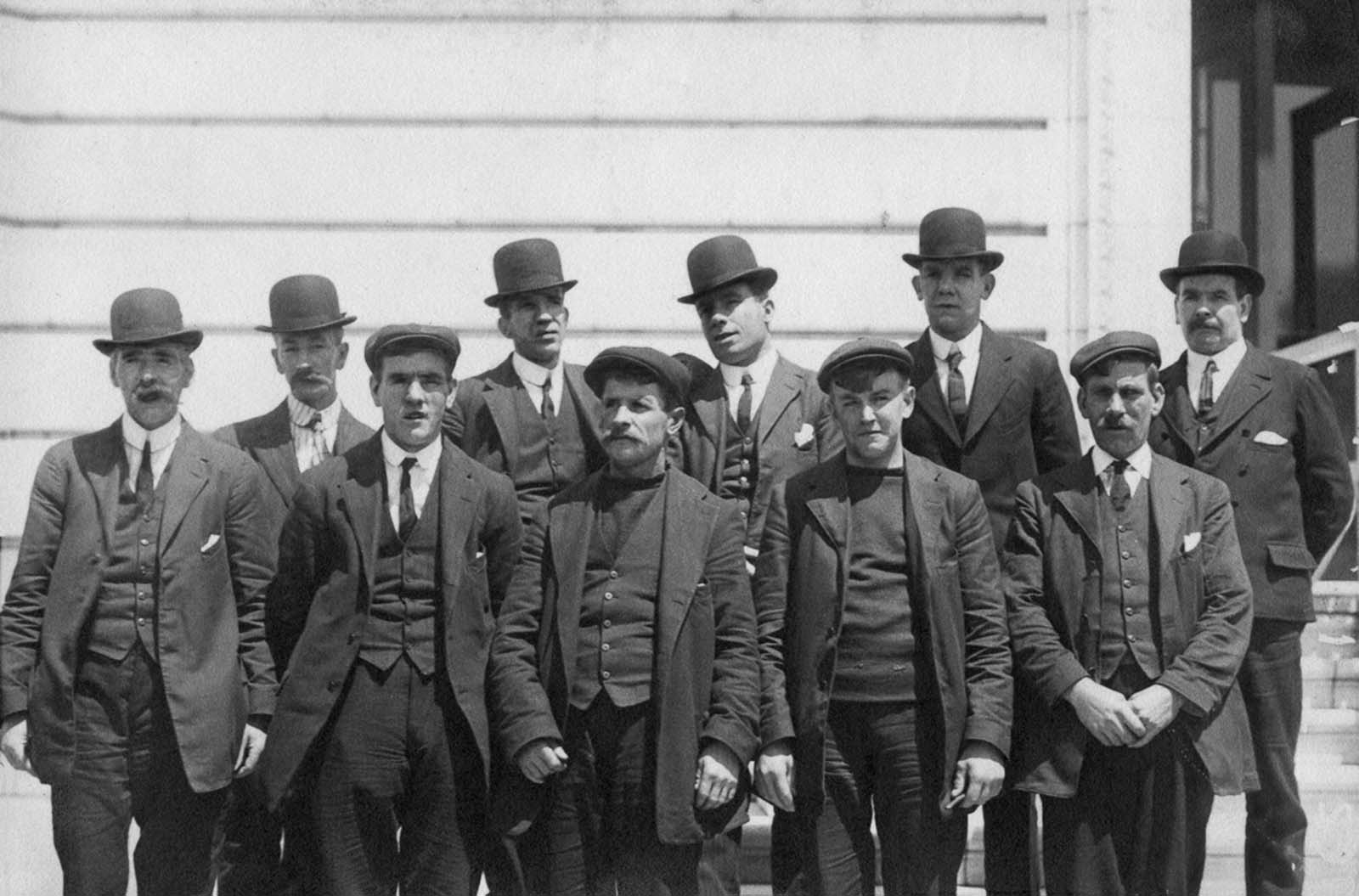
Surviving Titanic crew members after disembarking the Carpathia in New York City; First row, left to right: Ernest Archer, Frederick Fleet, Walter Perkis, George Symons, Frederick Clench. Second row, left to right: Arthur Bright, George Hogg, George Moore, Frank Osman, and Henry Etches

The Titanic employed:

- One able officer, also known as a bosun or boatswain, and one boatswain's mate, who had seniority over all the unlicensed deck crew. They were experienced seamen who managed the deck lines, deck cranes, winches, lifeboat davits, etc. on the deck. Only the boatswain's mate survived.
- Two medical doctors, one senior and one junior, titled Surgeon and Assistant Surgeon respectively. They were responsible for treating injuries and illnesses on board involving passengers (of any class) or crew and had access to the ship's hospital and store of pharmaceuticals. Neither medical officer survived the sinking.
- 29 able seamen, who had completed additional training and usually had seniority over other crew members. They carried out the day-to-day operations of the ship. In addition, they were trained to operate the lifeboat davits and man the lifeboats themselves. Nineteen of these survived the sinking.
- Two Masters-at-Arms, who, along with the First Officer, kept the keys to the only company-issued firearms on board. One survived, one was lost.
- Seven quartermasters; seamen who worked on and around the bridge to steer the ship as helmsmen, manage signal flags, and stand watch on the bridge to assist the duty officer with general navigation. All seven survived.
- Two window cleaners. One survived, one was lost.
- Two Carpenters/Joiners which keep eye on fresh water and were repairing and working with wooden parts of ship; neither one survived the sinking.
- One lamp trimmer. His duties, as he said was "to mix the paint, and all that kind of thing for the ship, and to look after all the decks, trim all the lamps, and get them in proper order. That is all, I think. To put the lights in at nighttime and take them off at daybreak." He survived the sinking.
- Six lookouts who worked two to a shift in the crow's nest; the shifts lasted only two hours at a time because of extremely cold winds which lookouts were exposed to in the open crow's nest. Despite the myths, lookouts were never supposed to have binoculars. They were supposed to see the object and not identify it. The binoculars would have made the view area even smaller and not help at all since the iceberg was practically invisible to the human eye, with the air temperature at 28 °F (−2 °C), and a 20-mile-per-hour (32 km/h) headwind. All six lookouts survived.

Deck crew
Name	Age	Hometown	Boarded	Position	Lifeboat	Body
Anderson, Mr. John	42	Southampton, Hampshire, England	Southampton	Able Seaman	3	
Archer, Mr. Ernest Edward	36	Southampton, Hampshire, England	Southampton	Able Seaman	3	
Bailey, Mr. Henry Joseph	46	Southampton, Hampshire, England	Southampton	Master-at-arms	16	
Bradley, Mr. Thomas Henry	28	Southampton, Hampshire, England	Southampton	Able Seaman		
Brice, Mr. Walter Thomas	42	Southampton, Hampshire, England	Southampton	Able Seaman	11	
Bright, Mr. Arthur John	42	Woolston, Hampshire, England	Southampton	Quartermaster	D	
Buley, Mr. Edward John	26	Southampton, Hampshire, England	Southampton	Able Seaman	10	
Clench, Mr. Frederick Charles	33	Southampton, Hampshire, England	Southampton	Able Seaman	12	
Clench, Mr. George James	31	Southampton, Hampshire, England	Southampton	Able Seaman		
Couch, Mr. Frank	28	Port Isaac, Cornwall	Southampton	Able Seaman		253^{MB}
Davis, Mr. Stephen James	39	Landport, Hampshire, England	Southampton	Able Seaman		
Evans, Mr. Alfred Frank	25	Southampton, Hampshire, England	Southampton	Lookout	15	
Evans, Mr. Frank Oliver	25	Southampton, Hampshire, England	Southampton	Able Seaman	10	
Fleet, Mr. Frederick	25	Southampton, Hampshire, England	Belfast	Lookout	6	
Foley, Mr. John	46	Southampton, Hampshire, England	Belfast	Deck Storekeeper (Note: Foley initially signed on as a quartermaster in Belfast but then signed on as a storekeeper in Southampton.)	4	
Forward, Mr. James	27	Southampton, Hampshire, England	Southampton	Able Seaman	16	
Haines, Mr. Albert M.	31	Southampton, Hampshire, England	Belfast	Boatswain	9	
Harder, Mr. William	39	Southampton, Hampshire, England	Southampton	Window Cleaner	14	
Hemming, Mr. Samuel Ernest	43	Southampton, Hampshire, England	Belfast	Lamp Trimmer	4	
Hichens, Mr. Robert	29	Southampton, Hampshire, England	Southampton	Quartermaster	6	
Hogg, Mr. George Alfred	29	Southampton, Hampshire, England	Belfast	Lookout	7	
Holman, Mr. Harry	27	Southampton, Hampshire, England	Belfast	Able Seaman		
Hopkins, Mr. Robert John	40	Southampton, Hampshire, England	Southampton	Able Seaman	13	
Horswill, Mr. Albert Edward James	33	Southampton, Hampshire, England	Southampton	Able Seaman	1	
Humphreys, Mr. Sidney James	52	Southampton, Hampshire, England	Southampton	Quartermaster	11	
Hutchinson, Mr. John Hall	28	Southampton, Hampshire, England	Belfast	Carpenter/Joiner		170^{MB}
Jewell, Mr. Archie	23	Southampton, Hampshire, England	Belfast	Lookout	7	
Jones, Mr. Thomas William	34	Liverpool, Lancashire, England	Southampton	Able Seaman	8	
King, Mr. Thomas Walter	42	Portsmouth, Hampshire, England	Southampton	Master-at-arms		
Lee, Mr. Reginald Robinson	41	Southampton, Hampshire, England	Southampton	Lookout	13	
Lucas, Mr. William Arthur	25	Southampton, Hampshire, England	Southampton	Able Seaman	D	
Lyons, Mr. William Henry	25	Southampton, Hampshire, England	Southampton	Able Seaman	4	(Note: Able Bodied Seaman Lyons survived the sinking and managed to swim to lifeboat 4. He was pulled aboard but soon lost consciousness and died either before or soon after being transferred to Carpathia.)
Matherson, Mr. David	33	Southampton, Hampshire, England	Southampton	Able Seaman		192^{MB}
Mathias, Mr. Montague Vincent	29	Southampton, Hampshire, England	Southampton	Mess Steward		
Maxwell, Mr. John	29	Southampton, Hampshire, England	Belfast	Carpenter/Joiner		
McCarthy, Mr. William	48	Cork, County Cork, Ireland	Southampton	Able Seaman	4	
McGough, Mr. James Francis	36	Southampton, Hampshire, England	Southampton	Able Seaman	9	
Moore, Mr. George Alfred	32	Southampton, Hampshire, England	Southampton	Able Seaman	3	
Nichols, Mr. Albert William Stanley	47	Shirley, Hampshire, England	Belfast	Boatswain		
O'Loughlin, Dr. William Francis Norman, MD	62	Southampton, Hampshire, England	Belfast	Surgeon		
Olliver, Mr. Alfred John	27	Southampton, Hampshire, England	Belfast	Quartermaster	5	
Osman, Mr. Frank	27	Itchen, Hampshire, England	Southampton	Able Seaman	2	
Pascoe, Mr. Charles Henry	45	Southampton, Hampshire, England	Southampton	Able Seaman	8	
Perkis, Mr. Walter John	37	Southampton, Hampshire, England	Belfast	Quartermaster	4	
Peters, Mr. William Chapman	26	Woolston, Hampshire, England	Southampton	Able Seaman	9	
Poingdestre, Mr. John Thomas	27	Southampton, Hampshire, England	Southampton	Able Seaman	12	
Rowe, Mr. George Thomas	32	Gosport, Hampshire, England	Belfast	Quartermaster	C	
Sawyer, Mr. Robert James	31	Southampton, Hampshire, England	Southampton	Window Cleaner		
Scarrott, Mr. Joseph George	33	Southampton, Hampshire, England	Southampton	Able Seaman	14	
Simpson, Dr. John Edward, MD	37	Southampton, Hampshire, England	Southampton	Assistant Surgeon		
Smith, Mr. William	26	Southampton, Hampshire, England	Southampton	Able Seaman		
Symons, Mr. George Thomas Macdonald	24	Southampton, Hampshire, England	Southampton	Lookout	1	
Tamlyn, Mr. Frederick	23	Southampton, Hampshire, England	Southampton	Mess Steward		123^{MB}
Taylor, Mr. Charles William Frederick	35	Southampton, Hampshire, England	Southampton	Able Seaman		
Terrell, Mr. Bertram	20	Southampton, Hampshire, England	Southampton	Able Seaman		
Vigott, Mr. Philip Francis	32	Southampton, Hampshire, England	Southampton	Able Seaman	13	
Weller, Mr. William Clifford	30	Southampton, Hampshire, England	Belfast	Able Seaman	7	
Wynn, Mr. Walter	41	Shirley, Hampshire, England	Belfast	Quartermaster	9	

=== Engineering ===
The engineers were responsible for keeping the engines, generators, and other mechanical equipment on the Titanic running. They were the highest paid members of the crew and had the education and technical expertise to operate, maintain, and repair the engineering plant.

On the night of 14 April, the Second Engineering Officer, John Henry Hesketh – the senior engineer on duty, and Leading Fireman Frederick Barrett were talking in No 6 Boiler room when the Titanic struck the iceberg at 11.40 pm. It ripped this part of the ship and the pair escaped through the connecting tunnel to No 5 Boiler Room, closing the bulkhead doors. Barrett later gave evidence at the Southampton Enquiry.

Most of the engineering crew remained below decks in the engine and boiler rooms: some fighting a losing battle to keep the ship afloat by operating the pumps in the forward compartments as well as keeping the steam up in the boiler rooms, so as to prevent boiler explosion on contact with the water; and others keeping the generators running to maintain power and lights throughout the Titanic up until two minutes before the ship sank.

The RMS Titanic employed:

- 25 engineers; all were lost.
- 2 boilermakers; both were lost.
- 13 leading firemen (Stoker Foremen) and 163 firemen (Stokers). The ship had 29 boilers, 25 containing six furnaces each, four containing three furnaces each, for a total of 162 furnaces. Each fireman was assigned one boiler and three furnaces. Of the Titanic's six boiler rooms, each leading fireman was assigned to two of them with 10 to 15 firemen under him. Next to each boiler was a coal chute that deposited coal from the overhead coal bunkers, and a fireman with a shovel would constantly feed coal into the three furnaces. Shifts for all the firemen and their foremen were four hours on and eight hours off. The heat in the boiler rooms usually exceeded 120 °F (49 °C), so a four-hour shift was very demanding. Most of the firemen worked wearing only their undershirts and shorts. Of the firemen, only three leading firemen and around 45 other firemen survived. Several of the firemen who survived got into the lifeboats dressed only in their undershirts and shorts in 28 °F (−2 °C) weather.
- 73 trimmers, or coal trimmers, on the Titanic. The trimmers worked inside the coal bunkers located on top of and between the boilers. The trimmers used shovels and wheelbarrows to move coal around the bunker to keep the coal level, and to shovel the coal down the coal chute to the firemen below to shovel it into the furnaces. If too much coal built up on one side of a coal bunker, the ship would actually list to that side. All the residual heat from the boilers rose up into the coal bunkers, and inside, the bunkers were poorly lit, full of coal dust, and extremely hot from the boilers. Around 20 of them survived.
- 33 greasers. These men worked in the turbine and reciprocating engine rooms alongside the engineers and they were responsible for maintaining and supplying oil and lubricants for all the mechanical equipment. Only four of them survived.
- Six electricians. One Chief, one senior, and four Assistants. All six were lost.
- Six mess hall stewards. These men worked in the crew's kitchen to cook and serve food for the crew: four served the engineering crew; two served the firemen. Just one steward from engineering survived.

Engineering crew
Name	Age	Hometown	Boarded	Position	Lifeboat	Body
Abrams, Mr. William Thomas	34	Southampton, Hampshire, England	Southampton	Fireman/Stoker		
Adams, Mr. Robert John	26	Southampton, Hampshire, England	Southampton	Fireman/Stoker		
Allen, Mr. Henry	30	Southampton, Hampshire, England	Southampton	Fireman/Stoker		145^{MB}
Allen, Mr. Ernest Frederick	24	Southampton, Hampshire, England	Southampton	Trimmer	B	
Allsop, Mr. Alfred Samuel	36	Southampton, Hampshire, England	Belfast	Electrician		
Avery, Mr. James Albert	20	Southampton, Hampshire, England	Southampton	Trimmer	15	
Bailey, Mr. George Frank	46	Woolston, Hampshire, England	Southampton	Fireman/Stoker		
Baines, Mr. Richard	24	Southampton, Hampshire, England	Southampton	Greaser		
Bannon, Mr. John Joseph	34	Southampton, Hampshire, England	Southampton	Greaser		
Barlow, Mr. Charles Henry	30	Southampton, Hampshire, England	Southampton	Fireman/Stoker		
Barnes, Mr. Charles	29	Southampton, Hampshire, England	Southampton	Fireman/Stoker		
Barnes, Mr. John	39	Woolston, Hampshire, England	Southampton	Fireman/Stoker		
Barrett, Mr. Frederick William	28	Southampton, Hampshire, England	Southampton	Leading Fireman	13	
Barrett, Mr. Frederick William	33	Southampton, Hampshire, England	Southampton	Fireman/Stoker		
Beattie, Mr. Joseph John	33	Southampton, Hampshire, England	Belfast	Greaser		
Beauchamp, Mr. George William	24	Southampton, Hampshire, England	Southampton	Fireman/Stoker	13	
Bell, Mr. Joseph	51	Southampton, Hampshire, England	Belfast	Chief Engineer		
Bendell, Mr. Frank	23	Southampton, Hampshire, England	Southampton	Fireman/Stoker		
Bennett, Mr. George Alfred	30	Southampton, Hampshire, England	Southampton	Fireman/Stoker		
Benville, Mr. Edward	42	Southampton, Hampshire, England	Southampton	Fireman/Stoker		
Bessant, Mr. William Edward Lowe	40	Southampton, Hampshire, England	Southampton	Fireman/Stoker		
Bevis, Mr. Joseph Henry	22	Southampton, Hampshire, England	Southampton	Trimmer		
Biddlecombe, Mr. Reginald Charles	31	Southampton, Hampshire, England	Southampton	Fireman/Stoker		
Biggs, Mr. Edward Charles	20	Southampton, Hampshire, England	Southampton	Fireman/Stoker		
Billows, Mr. James	20	Southampton, Hampshire, England	Southampton	Trimmer		
Binstead, Mr. Walter William	20	Southampton, Hampshire, England	Southampton	Trimmer	3	
Black, Mr. Alexander	28	Southampton, Hampshire, England	Southampton	Fireman/Stoker		
Black, Mr. D.	41	Southampton, Hampshire, England	Southampton	Fireman/Stoker		
Blackman, Mr. Albert Edward	23	Southampton, Hampshire, England	Southampton	Fireman/Stoker		
Blake, Mr. Percival Albert	22	Southampton, Hampshire, England	Southampton	Trimmer	15	
Blake, Mr. John Douglas Stanley George	26	Southampton, Hampshire, England	Southampton	Mess Steward		
Blake, Mr. Thomas Henry	36	Southampton, Hampshire, England	Southampton	Fireman/Stoker		
Blaney, Mr. James	32	Southampton, Hampshire, England	Southampton	Fireman/Stoker		
Blann, Mr. Eustace Horatius	21	Southampton, Hampshire, England	Southampton	Fireman/Stoker		
Bott, Mr. William Thomas	44	Southampton, Hampshire, England	Southampton	Greaser		
Bradley, Mr. Patrick Joseph	38	Southampton, Hampshire, England	Southampton	Fireman/Stoker		
Brewer, Mr. Henry "Harry"	30	Southampton, Hampshire, England	Southampton	Trimmer		
Briant, Mr. Albert	34	Southampton, Hampshire, England	Southampton	Greaser		
Briant, Mr. Arthur	30	Southampton, Hampshire, England	Southampton	Greaser		
Brooks, Mr. J.	25	Southampton, Hampshire, England	Southampton	Trimmer		
Brown, Mr. John	25	Southampton, Hampshire, England	Southampton	Fireman/Stoker		267^{MB}
Brown, Mr. Joseph James	25	Eastleigh, Hampshire, England	Southampton	Fireman/Stoker		
Burroughs, Mr. Arthur Peckham	34	Southampton, Hampshire, England	Southampton	Fireman/Stoker		
Burton, Mr. Edward John	35	Southampton, Hampshire, England	Southampton	Fireman/Stoker		
Butt, Mr. William John	30	Freemantle, Hampshire, England	Southampton	Fireman/Stoker		77^{MB}
Calderwood, Mr. Hugh	30	Belfast, Ireland	Belfast	Trimmer		
Canner, Mr. John	40	Woolston, Hampshire, England	Southampton	Fireman/Stoker		
Carr, Mr. Richard Stephen	27	Southampton, Hampshire, England	Southampton	Trimmer		
Carter, Mr. James	46	Southampton, Hampshire, England	Southampton	Fireman/Stoker		
Casey, Mr. Thomas	28	Southampton, Hampshire, England	Southampton	Trimmer		
Castleman, Mr. Edward	37	Southampton, Hampshire, England	Southampton	Greaser		78[?]^{MB}
Cavell, Mr. George Henry	22	Sholing Hampshire, England	Southampton	Trimmer	15	
Cherrett, Mr. William Victor	24	Southampton, Hampshire, England	Southampton	Fireman/Stoker		
Chisnall, Mr. George Alexander	36	Itchen, Hampshire, England	Belfast	Boilermaker		111^{MB}
Chorley, Mr. John Henry	25	Southampton, Hampshire, England	Southampton	Fireman/Stoker		
Clark, Mr. William	42	Southampton, Hampshire, England	Southampton	Fireman/Stoker	15	
Coe, Mr. Harry	21	Southampton, Hampshire, England	Southampton	Trimmer		
Coleman, Mr. John	57	Southampton, Hampshire, England	Belfast	Mess Steward		112{?}^{MB}
Collins, Mr. John Samuel	38	Southampton, Hampshire, England	Southampton	Fireman/Stoker	1	
Combes, Mr. George	34	Southampton, Hampshire, England	Southampton	Fireman/Stoker	3	
Cooper, Mr. Henry William	25	Southampton, Hampshire, England	Southampton	Fireman/Stoker		
Cooper, Mr. Frederick George	24	Southampton, Hampshire, England	Southampton	Trimmer		
Copperthwaite, Mr. Albert Harry	28	Southampton, Hampshire, England	Southampton	Trimmer		
Corcoran, Mr. Dennis	33	Southampton, Hampshire, England	Southampton	Fireman/Stoker		
Cotton, Mr. Alfred	35	Southampton, Hampshire, England	Southampton	Trimmer		
Couch, Mr. Joseph Henry	49	Southampton, Hampshire, England	Southampton	Greaser		
Couper, Mr. Robert Frederick William	30	Southampton, Hampshire, England	Southampton	Fireman/Stoker	3	
Coy, Mr. Francis Ernest George	26	Southampton, Hampshire, England	Southampton	Junior Assistant 3rd Engineer		
Crabb, Mr. Henry James	23	Southampton, Hampshire, England	Southampton	Trimmer		
Creese, Mr. Henry Philip	45	Southampton, Hampshire, England	Belfast	Deck Engineer		
Crimmins, Mr. James	21	Southampton, Hampshire, England	Southampton	Fireman/Stoker	13	
Cross, Mr. William Alfred	39	Southampton, Hampshire, England	Southampton	Fireman/Stoker		
Cunningham, Mr. Bernard	35	Southampton, Hampshire, England	Southampton	Fireman/Stoker		
Curtis, Mr. Arthur	26	Southampton, Hampshire, England	Southampton	Fireman/Stoker		
Davies, Mr. Thomas	33	Southampton, Hampshire, England	Southampton	Leading Fireman		
Dawson, Mr. Joseph	23	Dublin, Ireland	Southampton	Trimmer		227^{MB}
Diaper, Mr. Joseph	27	Southampton, Hampshire, England	Southampton	Fireman/Stoker		
Dickson, Mr. William	37	Southampton, Hampshire, England	Southampton	Trimmer		
Dilley, Mr. John	30	Southampton, Hampshire, England	Southampton	Fireman/Stoker		
Dillon, Mr. Thomas Patrick	33	Southampton, Hampshire, England	Southampton	Trimmer	4	
Dodd, Mr. Edward Charles	39	Southampton, Hampshire, England	Belfast	Junior 3rd Engineer		
Dodds, Mr. Henry Watson	27	Southampton, Hampshire, England	Southampton	Junior Assistant 4th Engineer		
Doel, Mr. Frederick	22	Southampton, Hampshire, England	Southampton	Fireman/Stoker	C	
Dore, Mr. Albert	22	Southampton, Hampshire, England	Southampton	Trimmer		
Doyle, Mr. Laurence	27	Southampton, Hampshire, England	Southampton	Fireman/Stoker		
Duffy, Mr. William Luke	36	Southampton, Hampshire, England	Belfast	Writer/Engineer's Clerk		
Dyer, Mr. Henry Ryland	24	Southampton, Hampshire, England	Southampton	Senior Assistant 4th Engineer		
Dymond, Mr. Frank	36	Itchen, Hampshire, England	Southampton	Fireman/Stoker	15	
Eagle, Mr. Alfred James Jacob	27	Southampton, Hampshire, England	Southampton	Trimmer		
Eastman, Mr. Charles	44	Millbrook, Hampshire, England	Southampton	Greaser		
Elliott, Mr. Everett Edward	23	Edmonton, London, England	Southampton	Trimmer		317^{M}
Ervine, Mr. Albert George	18	Belfast, Ireland	Belfast	Assistant Electrician		
Evans, Mr. William Thomas	33	Southampton, Hampshire, England	Southampton	Trimmer		31^{MB}
Farquharson, Mr. William Edward	39	Belfast, Ireland,	Southampton	Senior 2nd Engineer		
Fay, Mr. Thomas Joseph	30	Southampton, Hampshire, England	Southampton	Greaser		
Ferrary, Mr. Anton	33	Southampton, Hampshire, England	Southampton	Trimmer		308^{M}{?}
Ferris, Mr. William	39	Southampton, Hampshire, England	Southampton	Leading Fireman		
Fitzpatrick, Mr. Cecil William	30	Southampton, Hampshire, England	Southampton	Mess Steward	B	-
Fitzpatrick, Mr. Hugh Joseph	29	Furness, Lancashire, England	Belfast	Junior Boilermaker		
Flaherty, Mr. Edward	52	Southampton, Hampshire, England	Southampton	Fireman/Stoker	?	
Ford. Mr. H.	22	Southampton, Hampshire, England	Southampton	Trimmer		
Ford, Mr. Thomas	33	Southampton, Hampshire, England	Southampton	Leading Fireman		
Foster, Mr. Alfred Charles	37	Southampton, Hampshire, England	Southampton	Engineering Storekeeper		
Fraser, Mr. James	30	Southampton, Hampshire, England	Belfast	Junior Assistant Third Engineer		
Fraser, Mr. James	30	Southampton, Hampshire, England	Southampton	Fireman/Stoker		
Fredricks, Mr. Walter Francis	21	Southampton, Hampshire, England	Southampton	Trimmer	15	
Fryer, Mr. Albert Ernest	29	Southampton, Hampshire, England	Southampton	Trimmer	13	
Geer, Mr. Alfred Ernest	26	Southampton, Hampshire, England	Southampton	Fireman/Stoker		
Godley, Mr. George Auguste	38	Southampton, Hampshire, England	Southampton	Fireman/Stoker	?	
Godwin, Mr. Frederick Charles	33	Southampton, Hampshire, England	Southampton	Greaser		
Golder, Mr. Martin William	35	Southampton, Hampshire, England	Southampton	Fireman/Stoker		
Gordon, Mr. John	30	Southampton, Hampshire, England	Southampton	Trimmer		
Goree, Mr. Frank	40	Southampton, Hampshire, England	Southampton	Greaser		
Gosling, Mr. Bertram James	22	Southampton, Hampshire, England	Southampton	Trimmer		
Gosling, Mr. Frank Henry	25	Southampton, Hampshire, England	Southampton	Trimmer		
Gradidge, Mr. Ernest Edward	22	Southampton, Hampshire, England	Southampton	Fireman/Stoker		276^{MB}
Graham, Mr. Thomas Gibson	28	Belfast, Ireland	Belfast	Fireman/Stoker		
Green, Mr. George	20	Southampton, Hampshire, England	Southampton	Trimmer		
Gregory, Mr. David	43	Southampton, Hampshire, England	Southampton	Greaser		
Gumery, Mr. George	24	Birmingham, England	Southampton	Mess Steward		
Haggan, Mr. John	35	Southampton, Hampshire, England	Belfast	Fireman/Stoker	3	
Hall, Mr. Joseph	32	Southampton, Hampshire, England	Southampton	Fireman/Stoker		
Hallett, Mr. George Alexander	23	Southampton, Hampshire, England	Southampton	Fireman/Stoker		
Hands, Mr. Bernard	54	Killeshandra, Cavan, Ireland	Southampton	Fireman/Stoker		
Hannam, Mr. George	30	Southampton, Hampshire, England	Southampton	Fireman/Stoker		
Harris, Mr. Amos	24	Southampton, Hampshire, England	Southampton	Fireman/Stoker		
Harris, Mr. Edward John	29		Southampton	Fireman/Stoker		
Harris, Mr. Frederick	39	Southampton, Hampshire, England	Southampton	Fireman/Stoker	14	
Harrison, Mr. Norman E.	39	Southampton, Hampshire, England	Belfast	Assistant Second Engineer		
Harvey, Mr. Herbert Gifford	34	Belfast, Ireland	Southampton	Junior Assistant Second Engineer		
Haslin, Mr. James	45	Southampton, Hampshire, England	Southampton	Trimmer		
Hart, Mr. James	54	Southampton, Hampshire, England	Southampton	Fireman/Stoker		
Head, Mr. Arthur	24	Southampton, Hampshire, England	Southampton	Fireman/Stoker		
Hebb, Mr. William Albert Thomas	22	Southampton, Hampshire, England	Southampton	Trimmer	B	
Hendrickson, Mr. Charles Osker	28	Northam, Southampton, Hampshire, England	Southampton	Leading Fireman	1	
Hesketh, Mr. John Henry	33	Kirkdale, Liverpool, England	Belfast	Junior Second Engineer		
Heslin, Mr. James	51	Southampton, Hampshire, England	Southampton	Trimmer		
Hill, Mr. James	25	Southampton, Hampshire, England	Southampton	Trimmer		
Hinton, Mr. Steven William	30	Southampton, Hampshire, England	Southampton	Trimmer		85
Hodge, Mr. Charley	29	Southampton, Hampshire, England	Belfast	Senior Assistant Third Engineer		
Hodges, Mr. William	26	Southampton, Hampshire, England	Southampton	Fireman/Stoker		
Hodgkinson, Mr. Leonard	46	Southampton, Hampshire, England	Belfast	Senior Fourth Engineer		
Hopgood, Mr. Roland John	29	Southampton, Hampshire, England	Southampton	Fireman/Stoker		
Hosgood, Mr. Richard William	22	Southampton, Hampshire, England	Southampton	Fireman/Stoker		242
Hosking, Mr. George Fox	36	Southampton, Hampshire, England	Southampton	Senior Third Engineer		
Hunt, Mr. Albert Sylvanus	23	Southampton, Hampshire, England	Southampton	Trimmer	C	
Hunt, Mr. Thomas	27	Southampton, Hampshire, England	Southampton	Fireman/Stoker		
Hurst, Mr. Charles John	40	Southampton, Hampshire, England	Southampton	Fireman/Stoker		
Hurst, Mr. Walter	23	Southampton, Hampshire, England	Southampton	Fireman/Stoker	B	
Ingram, Mr. Charles	20	Southampton, Hampshire, England	Southampton	Trimmer		204^{MB}
Instance, Mr. Thomas	31	Southampton, Hampshire, England	Southampton	Fireman/Stoker		
Jackopson, Mr. John Henry	30	Southampton, Hampshire, England	Southampton	Fireman/Stoker		
Jago, Mr. Joseph	59	Southampton, Hampshire, England	Southampton	Greaser		
James, Mr. Thomas	27	Cardiff, Glamorgan, Wales	Southampton	Fireman/Stoker		
Joas, Mr. Nicolas	39	Southampton, Hampshire, England	Southampton	Fireman/Stoker		
Judd, Mr. Charles Edward	31	Southampton, Hampshire, England	Southampton	Fireman/Stoker	B	
Jukes, Mr. Henry James	38	Southampton, Hampshire, England	Southampton	Greaser		
Jupe, Mr. Boylett Herbert	30	Southampton, Hampshire, England	Southampton	Assistant Electrician		73^{MB}
Kaspar, Mr. Franz	40	Southampton, Hampshire, England	Southampton	Fireman/Stoker	9	
Kearl, Mr. Charles Henry	44	Ventnor, Isle of Wight, Hampshire, England	Southampton	Greaser		
Kearl, Mr. George Edward	25	Hampshire, England	Southampton	Trimmer		
Keegan, Mr. James	38	Southampton, Hampshire, England	Southampton	Leading Fireman		
Kelly, Mr. James	44	County Meath, Ireland	Southampton	Greaser		
Kelly, Mr. William Patrick	23	Dublin, Ireland	Belfast	Assistant Electrician		
Kemish, Mr. George	22	Shirley, Southampton, Hampshire, England	Southampton	Fireman/Stoker	9	
Kemp, Mr. Thomas Hulman	43	Southampton, Hampshire, England	Belfast	Assistant Fourth Engineer		
Kenzler, Mr. August	44	Southampton, Hampshire, England	Belfast	Storekeeper		
Kerr, Mr. Thomas Russell	26	Glasgow, Scotland	Southampton	Fireman/Stoker		
Kinchenten, Mr. Frederick Charles	36	Southampton, Hampshire, England	Southampton	Greaser		
Kinsella, Mr. Louis	30	Southampton, Hampshire, England	Southampton	Fireman/Stoker		
Kirkham, Mr. James	43	Whittingham, Liverpool, Lancashire, England	Southampton	Greaser		
Knowles, Mr. Thomas	39	Lymington, England	Southampton	Fireman's Messman	C	
Lahy, Mr. Thomas	41	London, England	Southampton	Fireman/Stoker		
Lee. Mr. Herbert Henry	17	Southampton, Hampshire, England	Southampton	Trimmer		
Light, Mr. Christopher William	20	Southampton, Hampshire, England	Southampton	Fireman/Stoker		
Light, Mr. W.	47	Southampton, Hampshire, England	Southampton	Fireman/Stoker		
Lindsay, Mr. Charles William	30	Bristol, Avon, England	Southampton	Fireman/Stoker	B	
Lloyd, Mr. William	29	Southampton, Hampshire, England	Southampton	Fireman/Stoker		
Long, Mr. Frank	31	Southampton, Hampshire, England	Southampton	Trimmer		
Long, Mr. William	36	Southampton, Hampshire, England	Southampton	Trimmer		
Mackie, Mr. William Dickson	32	London, England	Belfast	Junior Fifth Engineer		
Major, Mr. William	32	Southampton, Hampshire, England	Southampton	Fireman/Stoker	13	
Marett, Mr. George John	27	Southampton, Hampshire, England	Southampton	Fireman/Stoker		
Marsh, Mr. Frederick Charles	28	Southampton, Hampshire, England	Southampton	Fireman/Stoker		268^{MB}
Maskell, Mr. Leopold Adolphus	25	Southampton, Hampshire, England	Southampton	Trimmer		
Mason, Mr. Frank Archibald Robert	32	Southampton, Hampshire, England	Southampton	Fireman/Stoker	B	
Mason, Mr. James	39	Southampton, Hampshire, England	Southampton	Leading Fireman		
May, Mr. Arthur William Jr.	22	Southampton, Hampshire, England	Southampton	Fireman/Stoker		
May, Mr. Arthur William Sr.	59	Southampton, Hampshire, England	Southampton	Fireman's Messman		
Mayo, Mr. William Peter	27	Southampton, Hampshire, England	Southampton	Leading Fireman		117^{MB}
Mayzes, Mr. Thomas Jubilee	25	Southampton, Hampshire, England	Southampton	Fireman/Stoker	3	
McAndrew, Mr. Thomas Patrick	38	Liverpool, Merseyside, England	Southampton	Fireman/Stoker		
McAndrews, Mr. William	23	Southampton, Hampshire, England	Southampton	Fireman/Stoker		
McCastlin, Mr. William	38	Southampton, Hampshire, England	Southampton	Fireman/Stoker		
McGann, Mr. James	29	Liverpool, Lancashire, England	Southampton	Trimmer	B	
McGarvey, Mr. Edward Joseph	34	Liverpool, Lancashire, England	Southampton	Fireman/Stoker		
McGaw, Mr. Errol Victor	30	Aldershot, Hampshire, England	Southampton	Fireman/Stoker		
McInerney, Mr. Thomas	38	Bootle, Lancashire, England	Southampton	Greaser		
McInytre, Mr. William	22	Southampton, Hampshire, England	Southampton	Trimmer	A	
McQuillan, Mr. William	32	Belfast, Ireland	Belfast	Fireman/Stoker		183^{MB}
McRae, Mr. William Alexander	32	Shirley, Hampshire, England	Southampton	Fireman/Stoker		
McReynolds, Mr. William Thomas Carson	22	Belfast, Ireland	Belfast	Junior Sixth Engineer		
Middleton, Mr. Alfred Pirrie	27	Belfast, Ireland	Belfast	Assistant Electrician		
Milford, Mr. George	28	Ryde, Isle of Wight, Hampshire, England	Southampton	Fireman/Stoker		
Millar, Mr. Robert	27	Southampton, Hampshire, England	Southampton	Extra Fifth Engineer		
Millar, Mr. Thomas	33	Belfast, Ireland	Belfast	Assistant Deck Engineer		
Mintram, Mr. William	46	Southampton, Hampshire, England	Southampton	Fireman/Stoker		
Mitchell, Mr. Lorenzo Horace	19	Southampton, Hampshire, England	Southampton	Trimmer		
Moore, Mr. John James	29	Southampton, Hampshire, England	Southampton	Fireman/Stoker	3	
Moore, Mr. Ralph	22	London, England	Southampton	Trimmer		
Moores, Mr. Richard Henry	44	Southampton, Hampshire, England	Southampton	Greaser		
Morgan, Mr. Arthur Herbert	27	Southampton, Hampshire, England	Southampton	Trimmer		
Morgan, Mr. Thomas A.	26	Southampton, Hampshire, England	Southampton	Fireman/Stoker		302^{MB}
Morris, Mr. William Edward	23	Southampton, Hampshire, England	Southampton	Trimmer		
Moyes, Mr. William Young	23	Stirling, Scotland	Belfast	Senior Sixth Engineer		
Murdock, Mr. William John	34	Belfast, Ireland	Belfast	Fireman/Stoker	B	
Nettleton, Mr. George Walter	30	St. Denys, Hampshire, England	Southampton	Fireman/Stoker		
Newman, Mr. Charles Thomas	32	Southampton, Hampshire, England	Southampton	Engineering Storekeeper		
Niven, Mr. John Brown	30	Southampton, Hampshire, England	Southampton	Fireman/Stoker		
Noon, Mr. John Thomas	35	Southampton, Hampshire, England	Southampton	Fireman/Stoker		
Norris, Mr. James	22	Southampton, Hampshire, England	Southampton	Fireman/Stoker		
Noss, Mr. Bertram Arthur	21	Southampton, Hampshire, England	Southampton	Fireman/Stoker		
Noss, Mr. Henry	31	Southampton, Hampshire, England	Southampton	Fireman/Stoker	15	
Nutbean, Mr. William	31	Southampton, Hampshire, England	Southampton	Fireman/Stoker	D	
O'Connor, Mr. John	25	Southampton, Hampshire, England	Southampton	Trimmer	B	
Olive, Mr. Charles	31	Southampton, Hampshire, England	Southampton	Greaser		
Oliver, Mr. H.	32	Southampton, Hampshire, England	Southampton	Fireman/Stoker	3	
Othen, Mr. Charles Alfred	36	Southampton, Hampshire, England	Southampton	Fireman/Stoker	3	
Paice, Mr. Richard Charles John	32	Kingsclere, Hampshire, England	Southampton	Fireman/Stoker		
Painter, Mr. Charles	31	Southampton, Hampshire, England	Southampton	Fireman/Stoker		
Painter, Mr. Frank	28	Southampton, Hampshire, England	Southampton	Fireman/Stoker		
Palles, Mr. Thomas Henry Michael	45	Liverpool, England	Southampton	Greaser		
Parsons, Mr. Frank Alfred	27	Southampton, Hampshire, England	Belfast	Senior Fifth Engineer		
Pearce, Mr. John	28	Southampton, Hampshire, England	Southampton	Fireman/Stoker	15	
Pelham, Mr. George	39	Southampton, Hampshire, England	Southampton	Trimmer	16	
Perry, Mr. Edgar Lionel	19	Southampton, Hampshire, England	Southampton	Trimmer	?	
Perry, Mr. Henry Frederick	23	Southampton, Hampshire, England	Southampton	Trimmer		
Phillips, Mr. George	27	Southampton, Hampshire, England	Southampton	Greaser		
Pitfield, Mr. William James	25	Southampton, Hampshire, England	Southampton	Greaser		
Podesta, Mr. Alfred John Alexander	24	Southampton, Hampshire, England	Southampton	Fireman/Stoker	3	
Pond, Mr. George	32	Southampton, Hampshire, England	Southampton	Fireman/Stoker		
Prangnell, Mr. George Alexander	30	Southampton, Hampshire, England	Southampton	Greaser	B	
Preston, Mr. Thomas Charles Alfred	20	Southampton, Hampshire, England	Southampton	Trimmer		
Priest, Mr. Arthur John	24	Southampton, Hampshire, England	Southampton	Fireman/Stoker	15	
Proudfoot, Mr. Richard Royston	21	Plymouth, Devon, England	Southampton	Trimmer		
Pugh, Mr. Arthur Percy	31	Hampshire, England	Southampton	Leading Fireman		
Pusey, Mr. William Robert Holland	24	Hythe, Hampshire, England	Southampton	Fireman/Stoker	1	
Ranger, Mr. Thomas	29	Southampton, Hampshire, England	Southampton	Greaser	4	
Read, Mr. Joseph	20	Southampton, Hampshire, England	Southampton	Trimmer		
Reed, Mr. Robert Thomas	31	Gosport, Hampshire, England	Southampton	Trimmer		
Reeves, Mr. Frederick Simms	30	Southampton, Hampshire, England	Southampton	Fireman/Stoker		280^{MB}
Rentowl, Mr. Philip Charles	26	Southampton, Hampshire, England	Southampton	Fireman/Stoker		
Rice, Mr. Charles John	32	Southampton, Hampshire, England	Southampton	Fireman/Stoker	10	
Richards, Mr. Joseph James	30	Southampton, Hampshire, England	Southampton	Fireman/Stoker		
Rickman, Mr. George Albert	36	Milford, Hampshire, England	Southampton	Fireman/Stoker		
Roberts, Mr. Robert George	35	Bransgore, Hampshire, England	Southampton	Fireman/Stoker		
Rous, Mr. Arthur John	26	Southampton, Hampshire, England	Southampton	Plumber		
Rudd, Mr. Henry	23	Southampton, Hampshire, England	Southampton	Engineering Storekeeper		86^{MB}
Rutter, Mr. Sidney Frank	27	Southampton, Hampshire, England	Southampton	Fireman/Stoker		
Sangster, Mr. Charles Edward	30	Southampton, Hampshire, England	Southampton	Fireman/Stoker		
Saunders, Mr. F.	22	Southampton, Hampshire, England	Southampton	Fireman/Stoker		
Saunders, Mr. Walter Ernest	30	Southampton, Hampshire, England	Southampton	Fireman/Stoker		184^{MB}
Saunders, Mr. William Henry	23	Southampton, Hampshire, England	Southampton	Trimmer		
Scott, Mr. Archibald	40	Southampton, Hampshire, England	Southampton	Fireman/Stoker		
Scott, Mr. Frederick William	28	Southampton, Hampshire, England	Southampton	Greaser	4	
Self, Mr. Alfred Henry	40	Southampton, Hampshire, England	Southampton	Greaser		
Self, Mr. Albert Charles Edward	25	Southampton, Hampshire, England	Southampton	Fireman/Stoker	?	
Senior, Mr. Henry	31	London, England	Southampton	Fireman/Stoker	B	
Shea, Mr. Thomas	29	Southampton, Hampshire, England	Southampton	Fireman/Stoker		
Sheath, Mr. Frederick	20	Southampton, Hampshire, England	Southampton	Trimmer	1	
Shepherd, Mr. Jonathan	32	Southampton, Hampshire, England	Southampton	Junior Assistant Second Engineer		
Shiers, Mr. Alfred Charles	24	Southampton, Hampshire, England	Southampton	Fireman/Stoker	5	
Shillaber, Mr. Charles Frederick	20	Southampton, Hampshire, England	Southampton	Trimmer		195^{MB}
Shulver, Mr. Christopher Arthur	28	Southampton, Hampshire, England	Southampton	Fireman/Stoker	5	
Skeates, Mr. William	26	Southampton, Hampshire, England	Southampton	Trimmer		
Sloan, Mr. Peter	31	Southampton, Hampshire, England	Belfast	Chief Electrician		
Small, Mr. William McMillan	42	Southampton, Hampshire, England	Southampton	Leading Fireman		
Smith, Mr. Ernest George	27	Southampton, Hampshire, England	Southampton	Trimmer		
Smith, Mr. James Muil	35	Southampton, Hampshire, England	Belfast	Junior Fourth Engineer		
Smither, Mr. Harry James	22	Kilburn, Middlesex, England	Southampton	Fireman/Stoker		
Snellgrove, Mr. George	41	Millbrook, Hampshire, England	Southampton	Fireman/Stoker		
Snook, Mr. William Henry	26	Southampton, Hampshire, England	Southampton	Trimmer		
Snow, Mr. Eustace Philip	21	Southampton, Hampshire, England	Southampton	Trimmer	B	
Sparkman, Mr. Henry William	36	Southampton, Hampshire, England	Southampton	Fireman/Stoker		
Stanbrook, Mr. Augustus George	30	Southampton, Hampshire, England	Southampton	Fireman/Stoker		316^{M}
Steel, Mr. Robert Edward	29	Guernsey, Channel Islands	Southampton	Trimmer		
Stocker, Mr. Henry Dorey	20	Southampton, Hampshire, England	Southampton	Trimmer		
Street, Mr. Thomas Albert	25	Southampton, Hampshire, England	Southampton	Fireman/Stoker	9	
Stubbs, Mr. James Henry	28	Southampton, Hampshire, England	Southampton	Fireman/Stoker		
Taylor, Mr. George	23	Southampton, Hampshire, England	Southampton	Fireman/Stoker	1	
Taylor, Mr. John Henry	32	Southampton, Hampshire, England	Southampton	Fireman/Stoker		
Taylor, Mr. J.	42	Southampton, Hampshire, England	Southampton	Fireman/Stoker		
Taylor, Mr. William Henry	28	Southampton, Hampshire, England	Southampton	Fireman/Stoker	15	
Thomas, Mr. Joseph Wakefield	23	Southampton, Hampshire, England	Southampton	Fireman/Stoker		
Thompson, Mr. John William	42	Liverpool, England	Southampton	Fireman/Stoker	A	
Threlfall, Mr. Thomas	38	Liverpool, England	Southampton	Leading Fireman	14	
Thresher, Mr. George Terrill	25	Southampton, Hampshire, England	Southampton	Fireman/Stoker	?	
Tizard, Mr. Arthur Leopold	31	Southampton, Hampshire, England	Southampton	Fireman/Stoker		
Tozer, Mr. James	32	Southampton, Hampshire, England	Southampton	Greaser		
Triggs, Mr. Robert	41	Southampton, Hampshire, England	Southampton	Fireman/Stoker	3	
Turley, Mr. Richard	37	Newry, Down, Ireland	Southampton	Fireman/Stoker		
van der Brugge, Mr. Wessel Adrianus	42	Delfshaven, Rotterdam, Netherlands	Southampton	Fireman/Stoker		
Veal, Mr. Arthur	36	Southampton, Hampshire, England	Southampton	Greaser		
Vear, Mr. Henry	32	Southampton, Hampshire, England	Southampton	Fireman/Stoker		
Vear, Mr. William	32	Southampton, Hampshire, England	Southampton	Fireman/Stoker		59^{MB}
Ward, Mr. Arthur	24	Romsey, England	Southampton	Junior Assistant Fourth Engineer		
Ward, Mr. James William	31	Southampton, Hampshire, England	Southampton	Leading Fireman		
Wardner, Mr. Frederick Albert	39	Southampton, Hampshire, England	Southampton	Fireman/Stoker		
Wateridge, Mr. Edward Lewis	25	Southampton, Hampshire, England	Southampton	Fireman/Stoker		
Watson, Mr. William	27	Southampton, Hampshire, England	Southampton	Fireman/Stoker		158^{MB}
Webb, Mr. Samuel Francis	28	Salford, Manchester, Lancashire, England	Southampton	Trimmer		
Webber, Mr. Francis Albert	31	Southampton, Hampshire, England	Southampton	Leading Fireman		
White, Mr. Albert	17	Southampton, Hampshire, England	Southampton	Trimmer		
White, Mr. Alfred	32	Southampton, Hampshire, England	Southampton	Greaser	4	
White, Mr. Frank Leonard	27	Southampton, Hampshire, England	Southampton	Trimmer		
White, Mr. William George	23	Salisbury, Wiltshire, England	Southampton	Trimmer	15	
Williams, Mr. Samuel Solomon	26	Southampton, Hampshire, England	Southampton	Fireman/Stoker		
Wilson, Mr. Bertie	28	Southampton, Hampshire, England	Southampton	Senior Assistant Second Engineer		
Wilton, Mr. William Edward	45	Southampton, Hampshire, England	Southampton	Trimmer		
Witcher, Mr. Albert Ernest	40	Lymington, England	Southampton	Fireman/Stoker		
Witt, Mr. Henry Dennis	37	Southampton, Hampshire, England	Southampton	Fireman/Stoker		
Witts, Mr. William Francis	35	Southampton, Hampshire, England	Southampton	Trimmer		
Wood, Mr. Henry	31	Southampton, Hampshire, England	Southampton	Trimmer		
Woodford, Mr. Frederick Ernest	41	Southampton, Hampshire, England	Southampton	Greaser		163^{MB}
Worthman, Mr. William Henry	37	Southampton, Hampshire, England	Southampton	Fireman/Stoker		
Wyeth, Mr. James Robert	26	Southampton, Hampshire, England	Southampton	Fireman/Stoker		
Young, Mr. Francis James	30	Southampton, Hampshire, England	Southampton	Fireman/Stoker		

=== Victualling ===
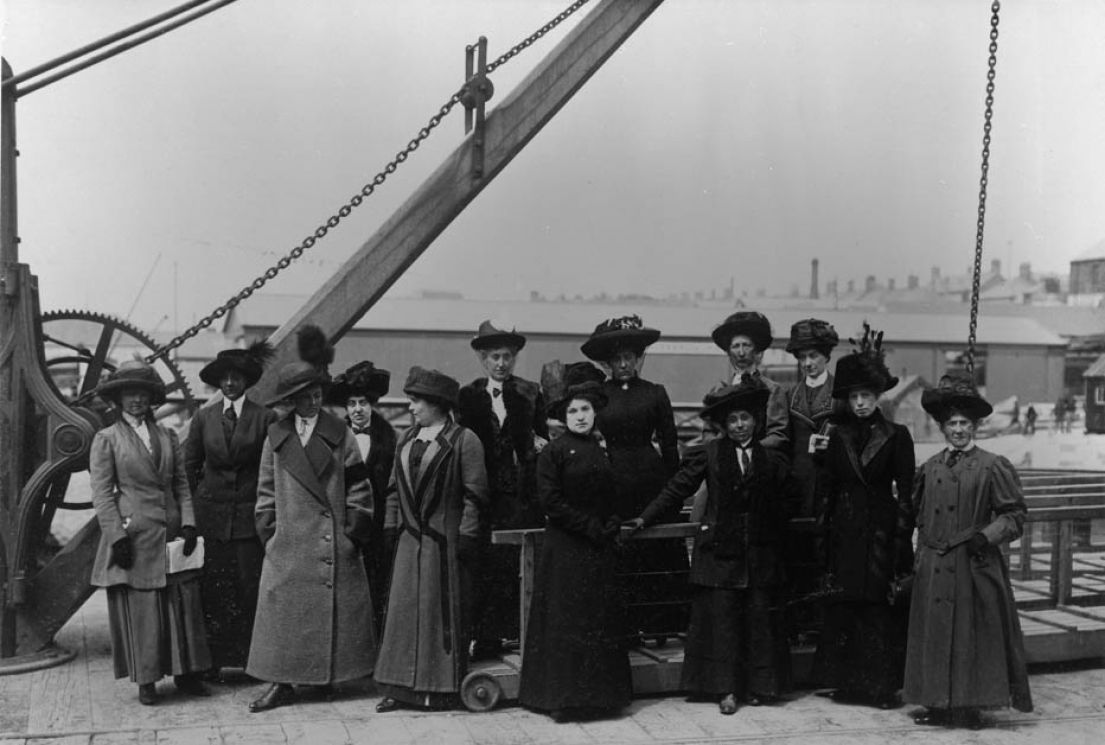
Surviving stewardess of the Titanic in Plymouth, a few weeks after the disaster. From left to right: Annie Canton, Kate Gold, Violet Jessop, Mabel Bennett, Maud Slocombe, Hypatia McLaren, Mary Sloan, Annie Robinson, Emma Bliss, Mary Gregson, Annie Martin, Alice Prichard, and Elizabeth Leather.

There were 431 men and women assigned to the Victualling Department on the Titanic, which was headed by the Chief Purser who was assisted by the Assistant Purser, and four clerks.

The department provided all the services for the occupants of the ship and attended to the various facilities provided about the ship. Stewards and stewardesses a range of provided services such as serving meal hours, housekeeping for both passengers and crew, providing room service, and attending to the Turkish baths.

The kitchen staff helped bakers and chefs prepared meals for the crew and all classes while scullions wash dishes and keep the kitchens cleans for the staff.

The victualling department was also where all the female crew were employed. The stewardesses' duties were similar to their male counterparts, although they usually served only women passengers.

Two wireless operators were also employed on ship and held a unique role amongst the crew. Employed by the Marconi Marine Company, they were assigned to the victualling staff despite working and living closely with the deck department and reporting directly to the captain. This is likely because at the time radio communication was seen principally as a service rather than as an essential part of the ship's operation.

- The Chief Purser and Assistant Purser, who supervised all of the Victualling Department and was the direct link between passengers and the ship's officers; neither survived the sinking.
- 322 stewards, who performed over 57 different functions in each class's dining saloon, public rooms, cabins and recreational facilities. Around 60 stewards survived. The most prominent of the stewards' roles were:
  - Bath Stewards, responsible for maintaining supplies in the communal bathrooms utilised by everyone except for a few First Class Passengers.
  - Bedroom Stewards, assigned to each class. The First Class Bedroom stewards not only cleaned the rooms and made beds, they were also available to serve food in the rooms or help the passengers in getting dressed. Most stewards were poorly paid and relied on tips for their income. Each First Class Bedroom Steward was responsible for three to five rooms, Second Class Stewards for up to 10 rooms, and Third Class Stewards for as many as 25.
  - Bellboys (known today as bellhops or porters), teenage boys as young as 14, who helped carry passengers' luggage when needed.
  - "Boots" (shoe shiners), stewards responsible for cleaning and shining the passengers' boots and shoes.
  - Glory-Hole Stewards, whose function was to clean and maintain the crew quarters (nicknamed Glory Holes, derived from a cupboard where useful but miscellaneous items are stored).
  - Linen Stewards, responsible for washing and maintaining all the linen on board (bed sheets, bathroom towels, table linen, etc.).
- 62 Galley and kitchen staff, including chefs, cooks, bakers, butchers, and scullions who worked in the kitchens of each class to cook the various meals for the passengers. Scullions, called dishwashers today, were responsible for washing and drying the dishes. Around 13 survived.
- 20 stewardesses; all but two survived.
  - 2 of the stewardesses were turkish bath attendants.
- 1 matron, who looked after third-class women and children and reported any signs of illnesses to the doctors; she did not survive.
- 13 Storekeepers, only two of whom survived.
- 4 turkish bath attendants; none of them survived.
- 4 Clerks, employed in the Purser's Office to deal with passenger's enquiries and requests (including depositing valuables for safekeeping).
- 2 wireless operators, who were employed by the Marconi Company. Only one survived the sinking.
- There were also three barbers assigned to the Titanic as part of the vendor group; August H. Weikman and Arthur White worked in First Class and Herbert Klein in Second Class. None of them were employed by the White Star Line for all three were self-employed and worked mostly for cash tips. The White Star Line only provided their meals and living quarters. Of this group only Weikman survived.

Victualling crew
Name	Age	Hometown	Boarded	Position	Lifeboat	Body
Abbott, Mr. Ernest Owen	21	Southampton, Hampshire, England	Southampton	First Class Lounge Pantry Steward		
Ahier, Mr. Percy Snowden	20	Southampton, Hampshire, England	Southampton	First Class Saloon Steward		
Akerman, Mr. Albert	28	Southampton, Hampshire, England	Southampton	Third Class Steward		
Akerman, Mr. Joseph Francis	35	Southampton, Hampshire, England	Southampton	Asst. Pantry Steward		205^{MB}
Allan, Mr. Robert Spencer	36	Shirley, Hampshire, England	Southampton	First Class Bedroom Steward		
Allen, Mr. George	26	Southampton, Hampshire, England	Southampton	Scullion		
Allsop, Mr. Frank Richard	41	Southampton, Hampshire, England	Southampton	Bedroom Steward		
Anderson, Mr. Walter Yuill	48	Southampton, Hampshire, England	Southampton	Bedroom Steward		146^{MB}
Andrews, Mr. Charles Edward	19	Southampton, Hampshire, England	Southampton	Assistant Second Class Saloon Steward	16	
Ashcroft, Mr. Austin Aloysius	26	Seacombe, Cheshire, England	Southampton	Clerk		
Ashe, Mr. Henry Wellesley	32	Liverpool, Lancashire, England	Southampton	Glory Hole Steward		34^{MB}
Ayling, Mr. Edwin George	22	Southampton, Hampshire, England	Southampton	Assistant Vegetable Cook		
Back, Mr. Charles Frederick	32	Southampton, Hampshire, England	Belfast	Assistant Lounge Steward		
Baggott, Mr. Allen Marden	28	Itchen, Hampshire, England	Southampton	First Class Saloon Steward	9	
Bagley, Mr. Edward Ernest	31	Southampton, Hampshire, England	Southampton	First Class Saloon Steward		
Bailey, Mr. George Francis	36	Shepperton, London, England	Belfast	Second Class Saloon Steward		161^{MB}
Ball, Mr. Percy	19	Southampton, Hampshire, England	Southampton	First Class Plate Steward	13	
Barker, Mr. Albert Vale	19	Winchester, Hampshire, England	Southampton	Assistant Baker		
Barker, Mr. Ernest Thomas	37	London, England	Southampton	First Class Saloon Steward		159^{MB}
Barker, Mr. Reginald Lomond	40	Southampton, Hampshire, England	Belfast	Assistant Purser		
Barlow, Mr. George	36	Southampton, Hampshire, England	Southampton	Second Class Bedroom Steward		
Barnes, Mr. Frederick	37	Southampton, Hampshire, England	Southampton	Assistant Baker		26^{MB}
Barratt, Mr. Arthur	16	Southampton, Hampshire, England	Southampton	Bell Boy		
Barringer, Mr. Arthur William	33	Southampton, Hampshire, England	Belfast	First Class Saloon Steward		
Barrow, Mr. Charles Henry John	35	Southampton, Hampshire, England	Southampton	Assistant Butcher		
Barrows, Mr. Edward William Peter	32	London, England	Southampton	First Class Saloon Steward		
Barton, Mr. Sidney John	25	Southampton, Hampshire, England	Southampton	Third Class Steward		
Baxter, Mr. Harry Ross	53	Southampton, Hampshire, England	Southampton	Third Class Steward		
Baxter, Mr. Thomas Ferguson	55	Southampton, Hampshire, England	Southampton	Linen Steward		235^{MB}
Bedford, Mr. William Barnet	31	Itchen, Hampshire, England	Southampton	Assistant Roast Cook		
Beedem, Mr. George Arthur	34	London, England	Southampton	Second Class Bedroom Steward		
Beere, Mr. William	19	Southampton, Hampshire, England	Southampton	Kitchen Porter		
Benham, Mr. Frederick John	29	Southampton, Hampshire, England	Southampton	Second Class Saloon Steward		
Bennett, Mrs. Mabel Kate	30	Southampton, Hampshire, England	Southampton	First Class Stewardess	5	
Bessant, Mr. Edward William	31	Southampton, Hampshire, England	Southampton	Baggage Steward		
Best, Mr. Edwin Alfred	38	Southampton, Hampshire, England	Belfast	First Class Saloon Steward		
Blake, Mr. John Douglas Stanley George	26	Southampton, Hampshire, England	Belfast	Mess Steward		
Bishop, Mr. Walter Alexander	34	Southampton, Hampshire, England	Belfast	First Class Bedroom Steward		
Blades, Mr. Frederick Charles	17	Southampton, Hampshire, England	Belfast	Lift Steward		
Bliss, Mrs. Emma (née Junod)	45	London, England	Southampton	First Class Stewardess	15	
Bochatay, Mr. Alexis Joseph	30	Southampton, Hampshire, England	Southampton	Assistant Chef		
Bogie, Mr. Norman Leslie	29	Eastleigh, Hampshire, England	Southampton	Second Class Bedroom Steward		274^{MB}
Bond, Mr. William John	40	Southampton, Hampshire, England	Belfast	First Class Bedroom Steward		
Boothby, Mr. Walter Thomas	36	Southampton, Hampshire, England	Southampton	Second Class Bedroom Steward		107^{MB}
Boston, Mr. William John	30	Southampton, Hampshire, England	Belfast	Assistant Deck Steward		
Boughton, Mr. Bernard John	24	Southampton, Hampshire, England	Southampton	First Class Saloon Steward		
Boyd, Mr. John	35	Southampton, Hampshire, England	Southampton	First Class Saloon Steward		
Boyes, Mr. John Henry	36	Southampton, Hampshire, England	Belfast	First Class Saloon Steward		
Bradshaw, Mr. John Albert Perkin	43	Southampton, Hampshire, England	Southampton	First Class Plate Steward		
Brewster, Mr. George Henry	48	Southampton, Hampshire, England	Belfast	First Class Bedroom Steward		
Bride, Mr. Harold Sidney	22	London, England	Belfast	Assistant Telegraphist	B	
Bristow, Mr. Robert Charles	31	Southampton, Hampshire, England	Southampton	Third Class Steward		290^{MB}
Bristow, Mr. Harry	33	Looe, Cornwall, England	Southampton	First Class Saloon Steward		
Brookman, Mr, John Cress	27	Southampton, Hampshire, England	Southampton	Third Class Steward		
Broom, Mr. Herbert George	33	Cowes, Isle of Wight, England	Belfast	Bath Steward		
Broome, Mr. Athol Frederick	30	Southampton, Hampshire, England	Southampton	Verandah Steward		
Brown, Mr. Edward	34	Southampton, Hampshire, England	Belfast	Saloon Steward	A	
Brown, Mr. Walter James	28	Southampton, Hampshire, England	Belfast	Saloon Steward		
Buckley, Mr. H.E.	34	Southampton, Hampshire, England	Southampton	Assistant Vegetable Cook		
Bull, Mr. Walter Edward	30	Southampton, Hampshire, England	Southampton	Scullion		
Bulley, Mr. Henry Ashburnham	21	Southampton, Hampshire, England	Southampton	Boots		
Bunnell, Mr. Wilfred James	20	Southampton, Hampshire, England	Belfast	Plate Steward		
Burgess, Mr. Charles Reginald	18	Southampton, Hampshire, England	Southampton	Extra Third Baker	15	
Burke, Mr. Richard Edward	30	Chandler's Ford, Hampshire, England	Belfast	Lounge Steward		
Burke, Mr. William	31	Southampton, Hampshire, England	Belfast	Saloon Steward	10	
Burr, Mr. Ewart Sydenham	29	Woolston, Hampshire, England	Southampton	Saloon Steward		
Burrage, Mr. Alfred Victor Edwards	20	Southampton, Hampshire, England	Southampton	Plate Steward	13	
Butt, Mr. Robert Henry	22	Southampton, Hampshire, England	Southampton	Saloon Steward		10^{MB}
Butterworth, Mr. John "Jack"	23	Southampton, Hampshire, England	Southampton	Saloon Steward		116^{MB}
Byrne, Mr. James Edward	31	Ilford, London, England	Southampton	Bedroom Steward		
Campbell, Mr. Donald Samuel	25	Southampton, Hampshire, England	Southampton	Third Class Clerk		
Carney, Mr. William John	31	Liverpool, Lancashire, England	Southampton	Lift Steward		251^{MB}
Cartwright, Mr. James Edward	32	Southampton, Hampshire, England	Belfast	Saloon Steward		320^{M}
Casswill, Mr. Charles	32	Southampton, Hampshire, England	Southampton	Saloon Steward		
Caton, Miss Annie	50	London, England	Southampton	Turkish Bath Stewardess	11	
Caunt, Mr. William Ewart	27	Southampton, Hampshire, England	Southampton	Grill Cook		
Cave, Mr. Herbert	34	Southampton, Hampshire, England	Belfast	Saloon Steward		218^{MB}
Cecil, Mr. Charles Thomas	20	Southampton, Hampshire, England	Southampton	Steward		
Chapman, Mr. Joseph Charles	32	Southampton, Hampshire, England	Southampton	Boots	9	
Charman, Mr. John James	25	Southampton, Hampshire, England	Southampton	Saloon Steward		185{?}^{MB}
Cheverton, Mr. William Frederick	27	Newport, Pembrokeshire, Wales	Belfast	Saloon Steward		334^{I}
Chitty, Mr. Archibald George	28	Southampton, Hampshire, England	Southampton	Steward		
Chitty, Mr. George Henry	52	Southampton, Hampshire, England	Southampton	Baker		
Christmas, Mr. Herbert Harry	33	Southampton, Hampshire, England	Southampton	Assistant Saloon Steward		
Coleman, Mr. Albert Edward	28	Southampton, Hampshire, England	Southampton	Saloon Steward		
Colgan, Mr. Joseph	33	Southampton, Hampshire, England	Southampton	Scullion	13	
Collins, Mr. John	17	Belfast, Ireland	Southampton	Scullion	B	
Conway, Mr. Percy Walter	25	London, England	Belfast	Saloon Steward		
Cook, Mr. Gilbert William	32	Southampton, Hampshire, England	Southampton	Saloon Steward		
Coombs, Mr. Charles Augustus	38	Southampton, Hampshire, England	Southampton	Cook		
Corben, Mr. Ernest Theodore	27	Southampton, Hampshire, England	Southampton	Assistant Printer Steward		
Cox, Mr. William Denton	29	Southampton, Hampshire, England	Southampton	Steward		300^{MB}
Crafter, Mr. Frederick Horace	27	Southampton, Hampshire, England	Southampton	Saloon Steward	15	
Crawford, Mr. Alfred George	36	Southampton, Hampshire, England	Belfast	Bedroom Steward	8	
Crisp, Mr. Albert Hector	35	Southampton, Hampshire, England	Belfast	Saloon Steward		
Crispin, Mr. William	32	Eastleigh, Hampshire, England	Southampton	Glory Hole Steward		
Crosbie, Mr. John Borthwick	45	London, England	Southampton	Turkish Bath Attendant		
Crow, Mr. George Frederick	30	Southampton, Hampshire, England	Southampton	Saloon Steward	14	
Crumplin, Mr. George Charles Chandler	35	Southampton, Hampshire, England	Belfast	Bedroom Steward		
Cullen, Mr. Charles James	45	Southampton, Hampshire, England	Belfast	Bedroom Steward	11	
Cunningham, Mr. Andrew Orr	35	Southampton, Hampshire, England	Belfast	Bedroom Steward	4	
Daniels, Mr. Sidney Edward	18	Southsea, Hampshire, England	Southampton	Steward	B	
Dashwood, Mr. William George	19	Southampton, Hampshire, England	Southampton	Saloon Steward		83^{MB}
Davies, Mr. Gordon Raleigh	33	Southampton, Hampshire, England	Belfast	Bedroom Steward		
Davies, Mr. Robert J.	26	Southampton, Hampshire, England	Belfast	Saloon Steward		191^{MB}
Davis, Mr. John James	27	Southampton, Hampshire, England	Belfast	Extra 2nd Baker		200^{MB}
Dean, Mr. George Fox Hopkins	19	Southampton, Hampshire, England	Southampton	Assistant Saloon Steward		252^{MB}
Deeble, Mr. Alfred Arnold	29	Southampton, Hampshire, England	Belfast	Saloon Steward		270^{MB}
Derrett, Mr. Arthur Henry	26	Southampton, Hampshire, England	Belfast	Saloon Steward		
Deslandes, Mr. Percival Stainer	36	Southampton, Hampshire, England	Southampton	Saloon Steward		212^{MB}
Dinenage, Mr. James Richard	47	Southampton, Hampshire, England	Southampton	Saloon Steward		
Dodd, Mr. George Charles	44	Southampton, Hampshire, England	Belfast	Steward		
Dolby, Mr. Joseph	36	Southampton, Hampshire, England	Belfast	Reception Room Steward		
Donoghue, Mr. Florence Thomas	35	Southampton, Hampshire, England	Belfast	Bedroom Steward		
Doughty, Mr. Walter Thomas	22	Southampton, Hampshire, England	Southampton	Saloon Steward		
Dunford, Mr. William	41	Southampton, Hampshire, England	Southampton	Hospital Steward		71^{MB}
Dyer, Mr. William Henry	31	Southampton, Hampshire, England	Southampton	Saloon Steward		
Edbrooke, Mr. Francis Samuel Jacob	24	Southampton, Hampshire, England	Southampton	Steward		
Ede, Mr. George Bulkeley	22	Southampton, Hampshire, England	Southampton	Steward		
Edge, Mr. Frederick William	37	Southampton, Hampshire, England	Southampton	Deck Steward		
Edwards, Mr. Charles Essex	38	Southampton, Hampshire, England	Southampton	Assistant Pantryman Steward		
Egg, Mr. William Henry	34	London, England	Southampton	Steward		
Ellis, Mr. John Bertram	28	Southampton, Hampshire, England	Southampton	Assistant Vegetable Cook	2	
Ennis, Mr. Walter	35	Southport, Lancashire, England	Southampton	Turkish Bath Attendant		
Etches, Mr. Henry Samuel	41	Southampton, Hampshire, England	Belfast	Bedroom Steward	5	
Evans, Mr. George Richard	32	Southampton, Hampshire, England	Belfast	Saloon Steward		
Fairall, Mr. Henry Charles	38	Ryde, Isle of Wight, England	Belfast	Saloon Steward		
Farrenden, Mr. Ernest John	32	Emsworth, Hampshire, England	Belfast	Confectioner		
Faulkner, Mr. William Stephen	37	Southampton, Hampshire, England	Belfast	Bedroom Steward	11	
Fellowes, Mr. Alfred James	29	Southampton, Hampshire, England	Belfast	Boots		138^{MB}
Feltham, Mr. George William	36	Southampton, Hampshire, England	Southampton	Vienna Baker		
Finch, Mr. Henry Herman "Harry"	18	Southampton, Hampshire, England	Southampton	Steward		
Fletcher, Mr. Peter William	26	Sholing, Hampshire, England	Belfast	Bugler Steward		
Foley, Mr. Wilfred Cyril	26	Southampton, Hampshire, England	Southampton	Steward	13	
Ford, Mr. Ernest	32	Southampton, Hampshire, England	Southampton	Steward		
Ford, Mr. Francis	37	Southampton, Hampshire, England	Southampton	Bedroom Steward		
Fox, Mr. William Thomas	27	Ealing, London, England	Southampton	Steward		214{?}^{MB}
Franklin, Mr. Alan Vincent	29	Southampton, Hampshire, England	Southampton	Saloon Steward		262^{MB}
Freeman, Mr. Ernest Edward Samuel	43	Southampton, Hampshire, England	Belfast	Deck Steward		239^{MB}
Geddes, Mr. Richard Charles	31	Southampton, Hampshire, England	Southampton	Bedroom Steward		
Gibbons, Mr. Jacob William	36	Studland, Dorset, England	Southampton	Saloon Steward	11	
Giles, Mr. John Robert	30	Southampton, Hampshire, England	Southampton	Baker		
Gill, Mr. Joseph Stanley	34	Southampton, Hampshire, England	Belfast	Bedroom Steward		49^{MB}
Gill, Mr. Patrick	38	Southampton, Hampshire, England	Southampton	Ship's Cook		
Gold, Mrs. Jane Kate (née Coulson)	42	Southampton, Hampshire, England	Southampton	Stewardess	11	
Gollop, Mr. Percival Salisbury	28	Southampton, Hampshire, England	Southampton	Assistant Passage Cook		
Goshawk, Mr. Arthur James	31	Southampton, Hampshire, England	Belfast	Third Saloon Steward		
Gregson, Miss Mary Josephine	45	Southampton, Hampshire, England	Southampton	Stewardess	16	
Gunn, Mr. Joseph Alfred	28	Southampton, Hampshire, England	Southampton	Assistant Saloon Steward		125{?}^{MB}
Guy, Mr. Elgar John	28	Southampton, Hampshire, England	Southampton	Boots	5	
Halford, Mr. Richard	22	Southampton, Hampshire, England	Southampton	Steward	15	
Hall, Mr. Frank Alfred James	38	London, England	Southampton	Scullion		
Hamblyn, Mr. Ernest William	41	Southampton, Hampshire, England	Southampton	Bedroom Steward		
Hamilton, Mr. Ernest William	25	Southampton, Hampshire, England	Belfast	Assistant Smoke Room Steward		
Harding, Mr. Alfred John	20	Swaythling, Hampshire, England	Southampton	Assistant Pantry Steward		
Hardwick, Mr. Reginald	21	Southampton, Hampshire, England	Southampton	Kitchen Porter	11	
Hardy, Mr. John	37	Southampton, Hampshire, England	Belfast	Chief 2nd Class Steward	D	
Harris, Mr. Charles William	19	Southampton, Hampshire, England	Southampton	Saloon Steward		
Harris, Mr. Clifford Henry	16	Southampton, Hampshire, England	Southampton	Bell Boy		
Harris, Mr. Edward Matthew	18	Winchester, Hampshire, England	Southampton	Assistant Pantryman Steward		
Harrison, Mr. Aragõa Drummond	40	Southampton, Hampshire, England	Southampton	Saloon Steward	9	
Hart, Mr. John Edward	31	Southampton, Hampshire, England	Southampton	Third Class Steward	15	
Hartnell, Mr. Frederick	21	Southampton, Hampshire, England	Southampton	Saloon Steward	11	
Hatch, Mr. Hugh	22	Southampton, Hampshire, England	Southampton	Scullion		
Hawkesworth, Mr. James	38	Southampton, Hampshire, England	Southampton	Saloon Steward		
Hawkesworth, Mr. William Walter	43	Southampton, Hampshire, England	Southampton	Deck Steward		
Hayter, Mr. Arthur	44	Southampton, Hampshire, England	Belfast	Bedroom Steward		25^{MB}
Heinen, Mr. Joseph Dominichus	30	Lewisham, London, England	Southampton	Saloon Steward		
Hendy, Mr. Edward Martin	38	Southampton, Hampshire, England	Belfast	Saloon Steward		
Hensford, Mr. Herbert George Ernest	29	Southampton, Hampshire, England	Southampton	Butcher		
Hewett, Mr. Thomas	37	Liverpool, Lancashire, England	Belfast	Bedroom Steward		168^{MB}
Hill, Mr. Henry Parkinson	36	Southampton, Hampshire, England	Southampton	Steward		
Hill, Mr. James Colston	38	Southampton, Hampshire, England	Belfast	Bedroom Steward		152^{MB}
Hinckley, Mr. George Herbert	35	Southampton, Hampshire, England	Southampton	Bath Steward		66^{MB}
Hine, Mr. William Edward	36	Southampton, Hampshire, England	Southampton	Baker		
Hiscock, Mr. Sydney George	22	Southampton, Hampshire, England	Southampton	Plate Steward		
Hoare, Mr. Leonard James	21	Southampton, Hampshire, England	Belfast	Saloon Steward		
Hogan, Mr. Albert John	19	Southampton, Hampshire, England	Southampton	Scullion		
Hogg, Mr. Charles William	37	Liverpool, Lancashire, England	Southampton	Bedroom Steward		
Hogue, Mr. E.	22	London, England	Southampton	Plate Steward		
Holland, Mr. Thomas	28	Liverpool, Lancashire, England	Belfast	Reception Steward		
Holloway, Mr. Sidney	20	Southampton, Hampshire, England	Southampton	Clothes Presser		273^{MB}
Hopkins, Mr. Frederick William	16	Southampton, Hampshire, England	Southampton	Plate Steward		
House, Mr. William Charles	38	Southampton, Hampshire, England	Belfast	Saloon Steward		
Howell, Mr. Arthur Albert	31	Itchen, Hampshire, England	Belfast	Saloon Steward		319^{MB}
Hughes, Mr. William Thomas	33	Southampton, Hampshire, England	Southampton	Steward		
Humby, Mr. Frederick	16	Southampton, Hampshire, England	Southampton	Plate Steward		237[?]^{MB}
Humphreys, Mr. Humphrey	31	Southampton, Hampshire, England	Southampton	Assistant Saloon Steward		
Hutchinson, Mr. James	29	Liverpool, Lancashire, England	Southampton	Vegetable Cook		250^{MB}
Hyland, Mr. Leo James	19	Southampton, Hampshire, England	Southampton	Steward	11	
Ide, Mr. Harry John	32	Southampton, Hampshire, England	Southampton	Bedroom Steward		
Ingrouille, Mr. Henry	21	Southampton, Hampshire, England	Southampton	Steward		
Ings, Mr. William Ernest	20	Southampton, Hampshire, England	Southampton	Scullion		
Jackson, Mr. Cecil	29	Southampton, Hampshire, England	Belfast	Boots		
Janaway, Mr. William Frank	35	Southampton, Hampshire, England	Belfast	Bedroom Steward		
Jenner, Mr. Thomas Henry "Harry"	41	Southampton, Hampshire, England	Belfast	Saloon Steward		
Jensen, Mr. Charles Valdemar	25	Southampton, Hampshire, England	Southampton	Saloon Steward		
Jessop, Miss Violet Constance	24	London, England	Southampton	Stewardess	16	
Johnstone, Mr. James	41	Southampton, Hampshire, England	Belfast	Saloon Steward	2	
Jones, Mr. Albert Hugh Brabner	17	Southampton, Hampshire, England	Southampton	Saloon Steward		
Jones, Mr. Arthur Ernest	38	Woolston, Hampshire, England	Southampton	Plate Steward		
Jones, Mr. Harry Owen Glendower	29	Alresford, Essex, England	Southampton	Roast Cook		
Jones, Mr. Victor Reginald	20	Southampton, Hampshire, England	Southampton	Saloon Steward		
Joughin, Mr. Charles John	32	Southampton, Hampshire, England	Belfast	Chief Baker	B	
Keen, Mr. Percy Edward	28	Southampton, Hampshire, England	Southampton	Saloon Steward	15	
Kelland, Mr. Thomas	21	Southampton, Hampshire, England	Southampton	Second Class Library Steward		
Kennell, Mr. Charles	30	Southampton, Hampshire, England	Southampton	Hebrew Cook		
Kerley, Mr. William Thomas	28	Salisbury, Wiltshire, England	Southampton	Assistant Saloon Steward		335^{OT}
Ketchley, Mr. Henry	30	Southampton, Hampshire, England	Belfast	Saloon Steward		
Kieran, Mr. James William	32	Southampton, Hampshire, England	Southampton	Chief 3rd Class Steward		
Kieran, Mr. Edgar Michael	31	Southampton, Hampshire, England	Southampton	Storekeeper		
King, Mr. Alfred John Moffett	18	Southampton, Hampshire, England	Southampton	Lift Steward		238^{MB}
King, Mr. Ernest Waldron	28	Clones, Monaghan, Ireland	Southampton	Clerk		321^{M}
Kingscote, Mr. William Ford	43	Southampton, Hampshire, England	Southampton	Saloon Steward		
Kirkaldy, Mr. Thomas Benjmain	37	Southampton, Hampshire, England	Southampton	Bedroom Steward		
Kitching, Mr. Arthur Alfred	30	Southampton, Hampshire, England	Southampton	Saloon Steward		
Klein, Mr. Herbert	33	Southampton, Hampshire, England	Southampton	Second Class Barber		
Knight, Mr. George	44	Woolston, Hampshire, England	Southampton	Saloon Steward	13	
Knight, Mr. Leonard George	21	Bishopstoke, Hampshire, England	Southampton	Steward		
Lacey, Mr. Bert William	21	Salisbury, Wiltshire, England	Southampton	Assistant Saloon Steward		44{?}^{MB}
Lake, Mr. William	35	Southampton, Hampshire, England	Belfast	Saloon Steward		
Lane, Mr. Albert Edward	34	Woolston, Hampshire, England	Southampton	Saloon Steward		
Latimer, Mr. Andrew L.	55	Liverpool, Lancashire, England	Belfast	Chief First Class Steward		
Lavington, Miss Elizabeth	39	Winchester, Hampshire, England	Southampton	Stewardess	11	
Lawrance, Mr. Arthur	25	Rochford, Essex, England	Belfast	Saloon Steward		90^{MB}
Leader, Mr. Archibald	22	Southampton, Hampshire, England	Southampton	Confectioner		
Leather, Mrs. Elizabeth Mary (née Edwards)	41	Liverpool, Lancashire, England	Southampton	Stewardess	16	
Lee, Mr. Henry Reginald	29	Southampton, Hampshire, England	Southampton	Scullion	?	
Lefebvre, Mr. Paul Georges	35	Southampton, Hampshire, England	Southampton	Saloon Steward		211^{v}
Leonard, Mr. Matthew	26	Belfast, Ireland	Belfast	Steward		
Levett, Mr. George Alfred	21	Southampton, Hampshire, England	Belfast	Assistant Pantryman		
Lewis, Mr. Arthur Ernest Read	27	Southampton, Hampshire, England	Southampton	Steward	15	
Light, Mr. Charles Edward	23	Christchurch, Dorset, England	Southampton	Plate Steward		
Littlejohn, Mr. Alexander James	40	Southampton, Hampshire, England	Belfast	Saloon Steward	13	
Lloyd, Mr. Humphrey	32	Southampton, Hampshire, England	Belfast	Saloon Steward		57^{MB}
Locke, Mr. Albert George	33	Southampton, Hampshire, England	Southampton	Scullion		
Longmuir, Mr. John Dickson	19	Eastleigh, Hampshire, England	Southampton	Assistant Pantry Steward		
Lovell, Mr. John	38	Southampton, Hampshire, England	Southampton	Grill Cook		
Lucas, Mr. William Watson	34	Southampton, Hampshire, England	Belfast	Saloon Steward	A	
Lydiatt, Mr. Charles	38	Southampton, Hampshire, England	Southampton	Saloon Steward		
Mabey, Mr. John Charles	23	Southampton, Hampshire, England	Southampton	Steward		
Mackie, Mr. George William	34	Southampton, Hampshire, England	Southampton	Bedroom Steward		
Major, Mr. Thomas Edgar	35	Southampton, Hampshire, England	Belfast	Bath Steward		
Mantle, Mr. Roland Frederick	36	Southampton, Hampshire, England	Southampton	Steward		
Marks, Mr. James	26	Southampton, Hampshire, England	Southampton	Assistant Pantryman Steward		
Marriott, Mr. John William	20	Southampton, Hampshire, England	Southampton	Assistant Pantryman Steward		2^{MB}
Marsden, Miss Evelyn	28	Southampton, Hampshire, England	Southampton	Stewardess	16	
Martin, Mrs. Annie Martin (née Woodland)	33	Portsmouth, Hampshire, England	Southampton	Stewardess	11	
Maynard, Mr. Isaac Hiram	31	Southampton, Hampshire, England	Belfast	Entre Cook	B	
Maytum, Mr. Alfred	52	Southampton, Hampshire, England	Belfast	Chief Butcher		141^{MB}
McCarthy, Mr. Frederick James	36	Southampton, Hampshire, England	Southampton	Bedroom Steward		
McCawley, Mr. Thomas W.	36	Southampton, Hampshire, England	Belfast	Gymnasium Steward		
McElroy, Mr. Hugh Richard Walter	37	Southampton, Hampshire, England	Southampton	Chief Purser		157^{MB}
McGrady, Mr. James	27	Southampton, Hampshire, England	Southampton	Saloon Steward		330^{A}
McKay, Mr. Charles Donald	30	Southampton, Hampshire, England	Belfast	Saloon Steward	11	
McLaren, Mrs. Hypatia (née Draco)	42	Southampton, Hampshire, England	Southampton	Stewardess	5	
McMicken, Mr. Arthur	23	Southampton, Hampshire, England	Belfast	Saloon Steward	11	
McMicken, Mr. Benjamin Tucker	21	Southampton, Hampshire, England	Belfast	Second Pantry Steward		
McMullin, Mr. John Richard	31	Southampton, Hampshire, England	Belfast	Saloon Steward		
McMurray, Mr. William Ernest	43	Southampton, Hampshire, England	Belfast	Bedroom Steward		
Mellor, Mr. Arthur	34	Southampton, Hampshire, England	Southampton	Saloon Steward		
Middleton, Mr. Mark Victor	24	London, England	Southampton	Saloon Steward		
Mills, Mr. Christopher	51	Southampton, Hampshire, England	Southampton	Butcher	C	
Mish'alānī, Mr. Ibrāhīm Mansūr (Abraham Mansoor Mishellany)	52	Southampton, Hampshire, England	Belfast	Printer Steward		
Moore, Mr. Alfred Ernest	39	Southampton, Hampshire, England	Southampton	Saloon Steward		
Morgan (Bird), Mr. Charles Frederick	42	Birkenhead, Cheshire, England	Southampton	Assistant Storekeeper		
Morris, Mr. Frank Herbert	28	Southampton, Hampshire, England	Belfast	Bathroom Steward	14	
Moss, Mr. William	34	Southampton, Hampshire, England	Belfast	First Saloon Steward		
Müller, Mr. Ludwig	37	Southampton, Hampshire, England	Southampton	Third Class Interpreter Steward		
Mullin, Mr. Thomas	20	Maxwelltown, Dumfries, Scotland	Southampton	Steward		323^{M}
Neal, Mr. Harold Bentley	25	Southampton, Hampshire, England	Southampton	Baker	13	
Nicholls, Mr. Sidney	39	Southampton, Hampshire, England	Southampton	Saloon Steward		
Nichols, Mr. Arthur	34	Southampton, Hampshire, England	Southampton	Steward		
Nichols, Mr. Walter Henry	35	Southampton, Hampshire, England	Southampton	Steward	15	
O'Connor, Mr. Thomas Peter	39	Southampton, Hampshire, England	Belfast	Bedroom Steward		
Olive, Mr. Ernest Roskelly	28	Southampton, Hampshire, England	Southampton	Clothes Presser Steward		
Orpet, Mr. Walter Hayward	31	Southampton, Hampshire, England	Southampton	Saloon Steward		
Orr, Mr. James	40	Southampton, Hampshire, England	Southampton	Assistant Vegetable Cook		
Osbourne, Mr. William Edward	32	Southampton, Hampshire, England	Belfast	Saloon Steward		
Owen, Mr. Lewis	49	Southampton, Hampshire, England	Southampton	Assistant Saloon Steward		
Pacey, Mr. Reginald Ivan	17	Southampton, Hampshire, England	Southampton	Lift Steward		
Paintin, Mr. James Arthur	29	Southampton, Hampshire, England	Southampton	Captain's Steward		
Parsons, Mr. Edward	35	Southampton, Hampshire, England	Southampton	Chief Storekeeper		
Parsons, Mr. Richard	18	Ashbrittle, Somerset, England	Southampton	Saloon Steward		
Pearce, Mr. Alfred Ernest	24	Southampton, Hampshire, England	Southampton	Steward		
Pearcey, Mr. Albert Victor	32	Southampton, Hampshire, England	Southampton	Steward	C	
Pennal, Mr. Thomas Frederick Cohen	33	Shirley, Hampshire, Hampshire, England	Southampton	Bath Steward		
Penny, Mr. William Far	30	Southampton, Hampshire, England	Southampton	Assistant Saloon Steward		
Penrose, Mr. John Poole	49	Southampton, Hampshire, England	Belfast	Bedroom Steward		
Perkins, Mr. Laurence Alexander	22	Southampton, Hampshire, England	Southampton	Telephone Steward		
Perren, Mr. William Charles	47	Southampton, Hampshire, England	Southampton	Boots Steward		
Perriton, Mr. Hubert Prouse	31	Southampton, Hampshire, England	Southampton	Saloon Steward		
Petty, Mr. Edwin Henry	25	Southampton, Hampshire, England	Southampton	Bedroom Steward		82^{MB}
Pfropper, Mr. Richard Paul Jozef	30	Southampton, Hampshire, England	Southampton	Saloon Steward	9	
Phillimore, Mr. Harold Charles William	23	Southampton, Hampshire, England	Belfast	Saloon Steward	14	
Phillips, Mr. John George "Jack"	25	Godalming, Surrey, England	Belfast	Telegraphist		
Platt, Mr. Wilfred George	18	Southampton, Hampshire, England	Belfast	Scullion		
Pook, Mr. Percy Robert	34	Southampton, Hampshire, England	Belfast	Assistant Pantry		
Port, Mr. Frank	32	Southampton, Hampshire, England	Belfast	Steward	13	
Porteus, Mr. Thomas Henry	32	Southampton, Hampshire, England	Belfast	Butcher		
Prentice, Mr. Frank Winnold	23	Southampton, Hampshire, England	Belfast	Storekeeper	4	
Prichard, Mrs. Alice Maud (née Friend)	33	Southampton, Hampshire, England	Belfast	Stewardess	11	
Prideaux, Mr. John Arthur "Jack"	23	Southampton, Hampshire, England	Belfast	Steward		
Prior, Mr. Harold John	21	Southampton, Hampshire, England	Belfast	Steward	11	
Proctor, Mr. Charles	40	Liverpool, Lancashire, England	Belfast	Chef		
Pryce, Mr. Charles William	22	Southampton, Hampshire, England	Southampton	Saloon Steward		
Pugh, Mr. Alfred	20	Southampton, Hampshire, England	Southampton	Steward	14	
Puzey, Mr. John Edward	35	Itchen, Hampshire, England	Belfast	Saloon Steward		21(?)MB
Randall, Mr. Frank Henry	27	Southampton, Hampshire, England	Southampton	Saloon Steward		
Ransom, Mr. James	33	Bristol, Avon, England	Belfast	Saloon Steward		
Rattenbury, Mr. William Henry	36	Southampton, Hampshire, England	Belfast	Assistant Boots Steward		
Ray, Mr. Frederick Dent	32	Southampton, Hampshire, England	Belfast	Saloon Steward	13	
Reed, Mr. Thomas Charles Prowse	43	Southampton, Hampshire, England	Southampton	Bedroom Steward		
Reeves, Mr. Frederick Vernon Hilton	20	Southampton, Hampshire, England	Belfast	Assistant Pantryman Steward		240{?}^{MBSee}
Revell, Mr. William	31	Southampton, Hampshire, England	Belfast	Saloon Steward		
Rice, Mr. John Reginald	25	Crosby, Lancashire, England	Southampton	Clerk		64^{MB}
Rice, Mr. Percy	19	Southampton, Hampshire, England	Southampton	Third Class Steward		
Ricks, Mr. Cyril Gordon	23	Southampton, Hampshire, England	Southampton	Storekeeper		100^{MB}
Ridout, Mr. Walter George	29	Southampton, Hampshire, England	Southampton	Saloon Steward		
Rimmer, Mr. Gilbert	27	Southampton, Hampshire, England	Southampton	Saloon Steward		
Roberton, Mr. George Edward	19	Southampton, Hampshire, England	Southampton	Assistant Saloon Steward		127^{MB}
Roberts, Mr. Frank John	36	Farnborough, Hampshire, England	Belfast	Third Butcher		231^{MB}
Roberts, Mr. Hugh H.	40	Bootle, Lancashire, England	Southampton	Bedroom Steward		93^{MB}
Roberts, Mrs. Mary Kezziah (née Humphrys)	41	Southampton, Hampshire, England	Southampton	Saloon Steward	16	
Robinson, Mrs. Annie (née Franklin)	40	Southampton, Hampshire, England	Southampton	Stewardess	11	
Robinson, Mr. James William	30	Southampton, Hampshire, England	Southampton	Saloon Steward		151^{MB}
Rogers, Mr. Edward James William	32	Southampton, Hampshire, England	Southampton	Assistant Storekeeper		282^{MB}
Rogers, Mr. Michael Joseph	27	Winchester, Hampshire, England	Southampton	Saloon Steward		
Ross, Mr. Horace Leopold	36	Southampton, Hampshire, England	Southampton	Scullion	13	
Rowe, Mr. Edward Maurice	31	Southampton, Hampshire, England	Belfast	Saloon 1st Class Steward		
Rule, Mr. Samuel James	58	Southampton, Hampshire, England	Belfast	Bathroom Steward	15	
Russell, Mr. Boysie Richard	17	Southampton, Hampshire, England	Southampton	Saloon Steward		
Ryan, Mr. Thomas	27	Southampton, Hampshire, England	Southampton	Third Class Steward		264{?}^{MB}
Ryerson, Mr. William Edwy	32	Southampton, Hampshire, England	Southampton	Saloon Steward	9	
Samuel, Mr. Owen Wilmore	41	Southampton, Hampshire, England	Southampton	Saloon Steward		217^{MB}
Saunders, Mr. William Ernest	26	Southampton, Hampshire, England	Southampton	Saloon Steward		
Savage, Mr. Charles James	23	Southampton, Hampshire, England	Southampton	Saloon Steward	11	
Scott, Mr. John	21	Southampton, Hampshire, England	Southampton	Boots Steward		
Scovell, Mr. Robert	42	Freemantle, Hampshire, England	Southampton	Saloon Steward		
Sedunary, Mr. Sidney Francis	25	Southampton, Hampshire, England	Southampton	Third Class Steward		178^{MB}
Seward, Mr. Wilfred Deable	25	London, England	Belfast	Second Class Chief Pantry Steward	3	
Shaw, Mr. Henry	41	Liverpool, Lancashire, England	Southampton	Kitchen Porter		
Shea, Mr. John	39	Southampton, Hampshire, England	Belfast	Saloon Steward		11^{MB}
Siebert, Mr. Sidney Conrad	29	Shirley, Hampshire, England	Belfast	Saloon Steward	4	(Note: Steward Siebert survived the sinking and managed to swim to lifeboat 4. He was pulled aboard but soon lost consciousness and died either before or soon after being transferred to Carpathia.)
Simmons, Mr. Andrew George James	31	Southampton, Hampshire, England	Southampton	Scullion		
Simmons, Mr. Frederick Charles	24	Southampton, Hampshire, England	Southampton	Saloon Steward		
Simmons, Mr. William Simon Catcott	37	Southampton, Hampshire, England	Southampton	Passage Cook		
Sivier, Mr. William	23	London, England	Southampton	Third Class Steward		
Skinner, Mr. Edward	41	Southampton, Hampshire, England	Belfast	First Class Saloon Steward		
Slight, Mr. Harry John	35	Southampton, Hampshire, England	Southampton	Steward		21{?}^{MB}
Slight, Mr. William Henry James	36	Southampton, Hampshire, England	Belfast	Larder Cook		
Sloan, Miss Mary Jane	45	Belfast, Northern Ireland	Southampton	Stewardess	12	
Slocombe, Mrs Maude Louise (née Waldon)	30	London, England	Southampton	Turkish Bath Stewardess	11	
Smillie, Mr. John Downing	38	Southampton, Hampshire, England	Belfast	Saloon Steward		91^{MB}
Smith, Mr. Charles Henry James	45	Southampton, Hampshire, England	Southampton	Saloon Steward		91^{MB}
Smith, Mr. Charles Edwin	38	Southampton, Hampshire, England	Southampton	Second Class Bedroom Steward		329^{MM}
Smith, Mr. James William	24	Southampton, Hampshire, England	Southampton	Assistant Baker		
Smith, Miss Katherine Elizabeth	45	Southampton, Hampshire, England	Southampton	Stewardess		
Smith, Mr. Reginald George	33	Southampton, Hampshire, England	Southampton	Saloon Steward (First Class)		
Snape, Mrs Lucy Violet	22	Witley, Surrey, England	Southampton	Stewardess		
Stagg, Mr. John Henry	38	Southampton, Hampshire, England	Southampton	Saloon Steward		
Stap, Miss Sarah Agnes	47	Birkenhead, Cheshire, England	Southampton	Senior Stewardess	11	
Stebbings, Mr. Sydney Frederick	38	Southampton, Hampshire, England	Belfast	Chief Boots Steward (First Class)		
Stewart, Mr. John	28	Southampton, Hampshire, England	Southampton	Verandah Steward	15	
Stone, Mr. Edmund	26	Southampton, Hampshire, England	Southampton	Bedroom Steward (First Class)		41^{MB}
Stone, Mr. Edward Thomas	30	Southampton, Hampshire, England	Southampton	Bedroom Steward (Second Class)		243^{MB}
Stroud, Mr. Edward Alfred Orlando	19	Southampton, Hampshire, England	Southampton	Saloon Steward (Second Class)		
Stroud, Mr. Harry John	35	Southampton, Hampshire, England	Southampton	Saloon Steward		
Strugnell, Mr. John Herbert	34	Southampton, Hampshire, England	Belfast	Saloon Steward (First Class)		
Stubbings, Mr. Harry Robert	31	Southampton, Hampshire, England	Belfast	Cook (Second Class)		
Swan, Mr. William	48	Liverpool, Lancashire, England	Belfast	Bedroom Steward (First Class)		
Symonds, Mr. John Crane	44	Southampton, Hampshire, England	Belfast	Saloon Steward		
Talbot, Mr. George Frederick Charles	27	Southampton, Hampshire, England	Southampton	Steward		150^{MB}
Taylor, Mr. Bernard Cuthbert	22	Southampton, Hampshire, England	Southampton	Steward (Third Class)		
Taylor, Mr. Leonard	19	Blackpool, England	Southampton	Turkish Bath Attendant		
Taylor, Mr. William John	31	Southampton, Hampshire, England	Southampton	Saloon Steward (First Class)		36{?}^{MB}
Taylor, Mr. Leonard	19	Blackpool, England	Southampton	Turkish Bath Attendant		
Terrill, Mr. Frank	27	Southampton, Hampshire, England	Southampton	Assistant Saloon Steward		
Teuton, Mr. Thomas Moore	32	Southampton, Hampshire, England	Southampton	Saloon Steward		226^{MB}
Thaler, Mr. Montague Donald	17	Croydon, London, England	Southampton	Steward (Third Class)		
Theissinger, Mr. Alfred	46	Southampton, Hampshire, England	Southampton	Bedroom Steward	11	
Thomas, Mr. Benjamin James	30	Southampton, Hampshire, England	Belfast	Saloon Steward	15	
Thomas, Mr. Albert Charles	23	Southampton, Hampshire, England	Southampton	Saloon Steward	15	
Thompson, Mr. Herbert Henry	25	Southampton, Hampshire, England	Belfast	Second Assistant Storekeeper		
Thorley, Mr. William Gordon	41	Southampton, Hampshire, England	Southampton	Cook		
Thorn, Mr. Harry	25	Southampton, Hampshire, England	Southampton	Assistant Ship's Cook		
Toms, Mr. Fred	29	Southampton, Hampshire, England	Belfast	Saloon Steward	15	
Topp, Mr. Thomas	27	Southampton, Hampshire, England	Southampton	First Class Saloon Steward		
Toshack, Mr. James Adamson	30	Southampton, Hampshire, England	Southampton	Saloon Steward (First Class)		
Turner, Mr. George Frederick	30	London, England	Southampton	Stenographer		
Turner, Mr. Leopold Olerenshaw	28	Church Stretton, Shropshire, England	Belfast	Saloon Steward (First Class)		23^{MB}
Veal, Mr. Thomas Henry Edom	38	Southampton, Hampshire, England	Southampton	Saloon Steward (First Class)		
Wake, Mr. Percy	32	Southampton, Hampshire, England	Southampton	Asst. Baker		
Wallis, Mrs. Catherine Jane (née Moore)	35	Southampton, Hampshire, England	Southampton	Second Class Matron		
Walpole, Mr. James	48	Southampton, Hampshire, England	Belfast	Chief Pantryman		
Walsh, Miss Catherine	42	Southampton, Hampshire, England	Southampton	Stewardess		
Ward, Mr. Edward Byron	34	Southampton, Hampshire, England	Southampton	First Class Bedroom Steward		
Ward, Mr. Percy Thomas	38	Hampshire, England	Southampton	First Class Bedroom Steward		
Ward, Mr. William	36	Southampton, Hampshire, England	Southampton	First Class Saloon Steward	9	
Wareham, Mr. Robert Arthur	36	Southampton, Hampshire, England	Southampton	First Class Bedroom Steward		246^{MB}
Warwick, Mr. Thomas	35	Hampshire, England	Southampton	First Class Bedroom Steward		
Watson, Mr. William Albert	14	Southampton, Hampshire, England	Southampton	Bell Boy		
Weatherston, Mr. Thomas Herbert	24	Liverpool, Lancashire, England	Belfast	First Class Saloon Steward		
Webb, Mr. Brook Holden	50	Southampton, Hampshire, England	Belfast	Smoke Room Steward (First Class)		
Weikman, Mr. Augustus Henry	51	Southampton, Hampshire, England	Southampton	First Class Barber	A	
Welch, Mr. William Harold	21	Southampton, Hampshire, England	Southampton	Cook		
Wheat, Mr. Joseph Thomas	30	Southampton, Hampshire, England	Belfast	Assistant Second Steward	11	
Wheelton, Mr. Edenser Edward	28	Shirley, Hampshire, England	Belfast	Saloon Steward (First Class)	11	
White, Mr. Arthur	37	Portsmouth, Hampshire, England	Southampton	Assistant First Class Barber		247^{MB}
White, Mr Edward Joseph	27	Southampton, Hampshire, England	Southampton	Glory Hole Steward		272^{MB}
White, Mr. Leonard Lisle Oliver	32	Southampton, Hampshire, England	Southampton	First Class Saloon Steward		
Whiteley, Mr. Thomas Arthur	18	London, England	Southampton	First Class Saloon Steward	B	
Whitford, Mr. Alfred Henry	37	Southampton, Hampshire, England	Southampton	Second Class Saloon Steward		
Widgery, Mr. Isaac George	37	Southampton, Hampshire, England	Southampton	Second Class Bath Steward	9	
Williams, Mr. Arthur John	42	Liverpool, Lancashire, England	Southampton	Storekeeper (First Class)		
Williams, Mr. Walter John	28	Southampton, Hampshire, England	Southampton	Second Class Saloon Steward	13	
Willis, Mr. William	59	Southampton, Hampshire, England	Southampton	Steward (Third Class)		
Willsher, Mr. William Aubrey	33	Southampton, Hampshire, England	Southampton	Butcher		
Windebank, Mr. Alfred Edgar	39	Shirley, Hampshire, England	Southampton	Cook	13	
Winser, Mr. Rowland	35	Southampton, Hampshire, England	Southampton	Steward (Third Class)		
Witter, Mr. James William Cheetham	31	Hampshire, England	Southampton	Second Class Smoking Room Steward	11	
Wittman, Mr. Henry	34	Southampton, Hampshire, England	Southampton	First Class Bedroom Steward		315^{MB}
Wood, Mr. James Thomas	40	London, England	Southampton	Second Class Saloon Steward		
Wormald, Mr. Frederick William	36	Southampton, Hampshire, England	Southampton	First Class Saloon Steward		144^{MB}
Wrapson, Mr. Frederick Bernard	19	Southampton, Hampshire, England	Belfast	Assistant Pantryman Steward		
Wright, Mr. Frederick	24	London, England	Southampton	Squash Court Attendant		
Wright, Mr. William	47	Southampton, Hampshire, England	Southampton	Glory Hole Steward	13	
Yearsley, Mr. Harry	40	Southampton, Hampshire, England	Southampton	First Class Saloon Steward	9	

=== Restaurant ===
The À La Carte Restaurant was located on B Deck, just below the fourth funnel. It was a private concession managed by Luigi Gatti, an Italian businessman who owned two other restaurants in London, as well as the À La Carte Restaurant on the RMS Olympic. The restaurant was open from 8:00 am to 11:00 pm and was open only to First Class passengers. The staff were not paid by the White Star Line, but by Mr. Gatti himself, who was on the Titanic for its maiden voyage. The restaurant was self-sufficient with its own cooks, waiters, cleanup crew, and other staff. Most of the employees were French or Italian nationals.

Of the entire staff of 69 people, only one male clerk and the two female cashiers survived.

Restaurant staff
Name	Age	Hometown	Boarded	Position	Lifeboat	Body
Allaria, Mr. Battista Antonio	30	Southampton, Hampshire, England	Southampton	Asst. Waiter		221^{MB}
Aspeslagh, Mr. Georges	26	London, England	Southampton	Asst. Plateman		
Banfi, Mr. Ugo	24	Finsbury, London, England	Southampton	Waiter		
Basilico, Mr. Giovanni	27	London, England	Southampton	Waiter		
Bazzi, Mr. Narciso	33	London, England	Southampton	Waiter		
Bernardi, Mr. Battista	22	Southampton, Hampshire, England	Southampton	Asst. Waiter		215^{MB}
Bertoldo, Mr. Fioravante Giuseppe	23	Burolo, Italy	Southampton	Asst. Scullion		
Beux, Mr. David	26	London, England	Southampton			
Bietrix, Mr. George Baptiste	28	Lambeth, London, England	Southampton	Cook		
Blument, Mr. Jean Baptiste	26	Southampton, Hampshire, England	Southampton	Pantryman		
Bochet, Mr. Pierre Giuseppe	43	London, England	Southampton	Waiter		
Bolhuis, Mr. Hendrik "Hennie"	21	Southampton, Hampshire, England		Larder Cook		
Bowker, Miss Ruth	27	London, England	Southampton	Cashier	6	
Casali, Mr. Giulio	27	Soho, London, England	Southampton	Waiter		
Chaboisson, Mr. Adrien Finnin	25	London, England	Southampton	Roast Cook		
Cornaire, Mr. Marcel Raymond André	19	London, England	Southampton	Asst. Roast Cook		
Coutin, Mr. Auguste Louis	28	Southampton, Hampshire, England	Southampton	Entrée Cook		
Crovella, Mr. Luigi	17	Southampton, Hampshire, England	Southampton	Asst. Waiter		
De Marsico, Mr. Giovanni	20	Soho, London, England	Southampton	Asst. Waiter		
Debreucq, Mr. Maurice Emile Victor	22	London, England	Southampton	Asst. Waiter		244^{MB}
Desvernine, Mr. Louis Gabriel	20	London, England	Southampton	Asst. Pastry Cook		
Donati, Mr. Italo Francesco	17	London, England	Southampton	Asst. Waiter		311^{M}
Dornier, Mr. Louis Auguste	20	Southampton, Hampshire, England	Southampton	Asst. Fish Cook		
Fey, Mr. Carlo	30	London, England	Southampton	Scullion		
Gatti, Mr. Gaspare Antonio Pietro "Luigi"	37	London, England	Southampton	Restaurant Manager		13^{M}
Gilardino, Mr. Vincenzo Pio	31	London, England	Southampton	Waiter		
Grosclaude, Mr. Gérald	24	London, England	Southampton	Waiter		
Jaillet, Mr. Henri Marie	28	London, England	Southampton	Pastry Cook		277^{MB}
Janin, Mr. Claude Marie	29	London, England	Southampton	Soup Cook		
Jeffery, Mr. William Alfred	28	Southampton, Hampshire, England	Southampton	Controller		
Jouannault, Mr. Georges Jules	24	Southampton, Hampshire, England	Southampton	Asst. Sauce Cook		
Martin, Miss Margaret Edwina "Mabel"	20	London, England	Southampton	Cashier	6	
Mattmann, Mr. Adolf	20	Southampton, Hampshire, England	Southampton	Ice Man		
Maugé, Mr. Paul Achille Maurice Germain	25	London, England	Southampton	Kitchen Clerk	13	
Monteverdi, Mr. Giovanni	23	Southampton, Hampshire, England	Southampton	Cook		
Monrós, Mr. Joan Xavier	20	Southampton, Hampshire, England	Southampton	Asst. Waiter		27^{MB}
Nannini, Mr. Francesco Luigi	42	Southampton, Hampshire, England	Southampton	Head Waiter		
Pachera, Mr. Jean Baptiste Stanislas	19	Southampton, Hampshire, England	Southampton	Asst. Larder Cook		
Pedrini, Mr. Alessandro	21	Southampton, Hampshire, England	Southampton	Asst. Waiter		104^{MB}
Peracchio, Mr. Alberto	20	Southampton, Hampshire, England	Southampton	Asst. Waiter		
Peracchio, Mr. Sebastiano	17	Southampton, Hampshire, England	Southampton	Asst. Waiter		
Perotti, Mr. Alfonso	20	London, England	Southampton	Asst. Waiter		
Phillips, Mr. Walter John	35	Southampton, Hampshire, England	Southampton	Storekeeper		
Piatti, Mr. Luigi	17	London, England	Southampton	Asst. Waiter		
Piazza, Mr. Pompeo	30	London, England	Southampton	Waiter		266^{MB}
Poggi, Mr. Emilio	28	Southampton, Hampshire, England	Southampton	Waiter		301^{MB}
Price, Mr. Ernest	17	London, England	Southampton	Barman		186^{MB}
Ratti, Mr. Enrico	21	London, England	Southampton	Waiter		
Ricaldone, Mr. Rinaldo Renato	22	London, England	Southampton	Asst. Waiter		
Rigozzi, Mr. Abele	22	London, England	Southampton	Asst. Waiter		115^{MB}
Rotta, Mr. Angelo Mario	23	London, England	Southampton	Waiter		
Rousseau, Mr. Pierre	49	London, England	Southampton	Chef		
Saccaggi, Mr. Giovanni Giuseppe Emilio	24	London, England	Southampton	Asst. Waiter		
Salussolia, Mr. Giovanni	25	London, England	Southampton	Glass Man		
Sartori, Mr. Lazar	24	London, England	Southampton	Asst. Glass Man		
Scavino, Mr. Candido	42	London, England	Southampton	Carver		
Sesia, Mr. Giacomo	24	London, England	Southampton	Waiter		
Testoni, Mr. Ercole	23	London, England	Southampton	Asst. Glass Man		
Tietz, Mr. Karl	27	Southampton, Hampshire, England	Southampton	Kitchen Porter		
Turvey, Mr. Charles	16	London, England	Southampton	Page Boy		
Urbini, Mr. Roberto	22	London, England	Southampton	Waiter		
Valvassori, Mr. Ettore Luigi	35	London, England	Southampton	Waiter		
Vicat, Mr. Alphonse Jean Eugene	21	London, England	Southampton	Cook		
Villvarlange, Mr. Pierre Léon Gabriel	19	Paris, France	Southampton	Asst. Soup Cook		
Vine, Mr. H.	18	London, England	Southampton	Asst. Controller		
Vioni, Mr. Roberto	31	London, England	Southampton	Waiter		
Voegelin-Dubach, Mr. Johannes	35	London, England	Southampton	Coffee Maker		
Zanetti, Mr. Minio	20	London, England	Southampton	Asst. Waiter		
Zarracchi, Mr. L.	26	Southampton, Hampshire, England	Southampton	Wine Butler		

=== Postal clerks ===
The Titanic's five postal clerks—two British, three American—were charged with the supervision and processing of all incoming and outgoing mail on board the ship. On the night of the disaster, the five postal clerks were celebrating Oscar Woody's 41st birthday. After the ship hit the iceberg, Jago Smith was sent to report to Captain Smith on the mailroom's conditions, confirming the knowledge that the ship was sinking. The five clerks set themselves to the task of attempting to save the 200 registered mail sacks by hauling them to the upper decks, with little thought of their own safety. All five mail clerks died; only March and Woody's bodies were recovered.

Postal clerks
Name	Age	Hometown	Boarded	Body
Gwinn, Mr. William Logan	37	New York City, US	Southampton	
March, Mr. John Starr	50	Newark, New Jersey, US	Southampton	225^{MB}
Smith, Mr. John Richard "Jago"	35	Truro, England	Southampton	
Williamson, Mr. James Bertram	35	Dublin, Ireland	Southampton	
Woody, Mr. Oscar Scott	41	Clifton, Virginia, US	Southampton	167^{MB}

=== Guarantee group ===
The nine-member guarantee group were given passenger accommodation in first and second class. Headed by the ship's designer, Thomas Andrews, the group's responsibility was to accompany the ship on her maiden voyage and make notes about the ship's performance, and to assist the crew in fixing any problems that might arise during the voyage. They were not considered standard crewmembers but, due to their unique status as shipbuilders, are listed here as well. The entire group died; none of their bodies were recovered.

Joseph Thompson, a tenth member of the group, was a painter & decorator. He accompanied the ship during the delivery trip from Belfast to Southampton where he disembarked.

Guarantee group
Name	Age	Class	Hometown	Boarded	Position
Andrews, Mr. Thomas	39	First	Belfast, Ireland	Belfast	Shipbuilder
Campbell, Mr. William Henry	21	Second	Belfast, Ireland	Belfast	Joiner
Chisholm, Mr. Roderick Robert Crispin	40	First	Belfast, Ireland	Belfast	Draughtsman
Cunningham, Mr. Alfred Fleming	21	Second	Belfast, Ireland	Belfast	Fitter
Frost, Mr. Anthony Wood "Artie"	37	Second	Belfast, Ireland	Belfast	Fitter
Knight, Mr. Robert J.	39	Second	Belfast, Ireland	Belfast	Fitter
Parkes, Mr. Francis "Frank"	21	Second	Belfast, Ireland	Belfast	Plumber
Parr, Mr. William Henry Marsh	29	First	Belfast, Ireland	Belfast	Electrician
Watson, Mr. Ennis Hastings	18	Second	Belfast, Ireland	Belfast	Electrician's Apprentice

=== Orchestra ===
The ship's eight-member orchestra was not on the White Star Line's payroll but was contracted to White Star by the Liverpool firm of C.W. & F.N. Black, which at that time placed musicians on almost all British liners. The musicians boarded at Southampton and traveled in second-class.

Until the night of the sinking, the orchestra performed as two separate entities: a quintet led by violinist and official bandleader Wallace Hartley, that played at teatime, after-dinner concerts, and Sunday services, among other occasions; and a violin, cello, and piano trio comprising Roger Bricoux, Georges Krins, and William Brailey, that played at the À La Carte Restaurant and the Café Parisien. None of the orchestra members survived.

Musicians
Name	Age	Hometown	Position	Body
Brailey, William Theodore	24	London, England	Pianist	
Bricoux, Roger Marie Leon Joseph	20	Cosne-sur-Loire, France	Cellist	
Clarke, John Frederick Preston	28	Liverpool, Lancashire, England	Bassist	202^{MB}
Hartley, Wallace Henry	33	Colne, Lancashire, England	Bandmaster, violinist	224^{MB}
Hume, John Law "Jock"	21	Dumfries, Dumfriesshire, Scotland	Violinist	193^{MB}
Krins, Georges Alexandre	23	London, England	Violinist	
Taylor, Percy Cornelius	40	London, England	Cellist	
Woodward, John Wesley	32	Oxford, Oxfordshire, England	Cellist	

== First surviving crew members to die ==
These following entries within a 5-year period from the time of sinking are found under "First survivors to die after the disaster" on Encyclopedia Titanica.

First surviving crew to die
Name	Position	Date of birth	Date of death	Age at time of disaster	Age at time of death	Additional notes
Reginald Lee	Lookout	19 May 1870	6 August 1913	41 years, 332 days	43 years, 79 days	Lee died of pneumonia less than 2 years after the sinking, making him the first surviving crew member to die.
Annie Robinson	Stewardess	27 February 1865	9 October 1914	47 years, 48 days	49 years, 224 days	Robinson likely died from suicide by drowning, by jumping off SS Devonian. Complications from the disaster may have included PTSD.
Samuel J. Rule	First Class Bathroom Steward	11 March 1854	15 April 1915	58 years, 35 days	61 years, 35 days	Rule allegedly suffered after the disaster from an unknown mental illness. He died on the third anniversary of the Titanic disaster.
Frederick W. Scott	Greaser	26 November 1883	28 September 1915	28 years, 141 days	31 years, 306 days	Scott later died as a crew member aboard the paddle steamer SS La Marguerite from a boiler explosion.
James A. Avery	Trimmer	3 September 1891	17 December 1915	20 years, 225 days	24 years, 105 days	Avery died from a stroke.
Wilfred C. Foley	Third Class Steward	9 May 1890	3 April 1916	21 years, 342 days	25 years, 330 days	Foley died from tuberculosis.
George Combes	Fireman	7 September 1877	13 August 1916	34 years, 221 days	38 years, 341 days	Combes died from tuberculosis.

== Last surviving crew members to die ==
Last living crewmembers
Name	Position	Date of birth	Date of death	Age at time of disaster	Age at time of death	Additional notes
Joseph Boxhall	Fourth Officer	23 March 1884	25 April 1967	28 years, 23 days	83 years, 33 days	Last living of Titanic's surviving officers.
George Rowe	Quartermaster	20 March 1881	14 February 1974	31 years, 26 days	92 years, 331 days	Last surviving Quartermaster.
Leo James Hyland	Third Class Steward	6 March 1893	14 June 1974	19 years, 40 days	81 years, 100 days	Hyland later provided research that was used for the 1958 film, A Night to Remember.
Mabel Kate Bennett	Stewardess	22 September 1878	22 September 1974	33 years, 206 days	96 years, 0 days	Last surviving female crew member.
Frederick Dent Ray	Saloon Steward	20 June 1879	15 January 1977	32 years, 300 days	97 years, 209 days	Ray was the longest lived member of the surviving crew.
Frank Prentice	Storekeeper	17 February 1889	19 May 1982	23 years, 58 days	93 years, 91 days	Shortly after impact, Prentice went up to the promenade deck to survey the scene and "saw the forward well deck covered in ice".
Sidney Daniels	Third Class Steward	19 November 1893	25 May 1983	18 years, 148 days	89 years, 187 days	Last living steward and crew member.

== See also ==
- Passengers of the Titanic
- Seafarer's professions and ranks
