= Roderick Chisholm (disambiguation) =

Roderick Chisholm (1916–1999) was an American philosopher.

Roderick Chisholm may also refer to:

- Roderick Chisholm (rower) (born 1974), British rower
- Roderick Chisholm (engineer) (1868–1912), Scottish designer; co-designer of the RMS Titanic
- Roderick Aeneas Chisholm (1911–1994), British night fighter pilot
