= Frederick Dent Ray =

Survivor of RMS Titanic

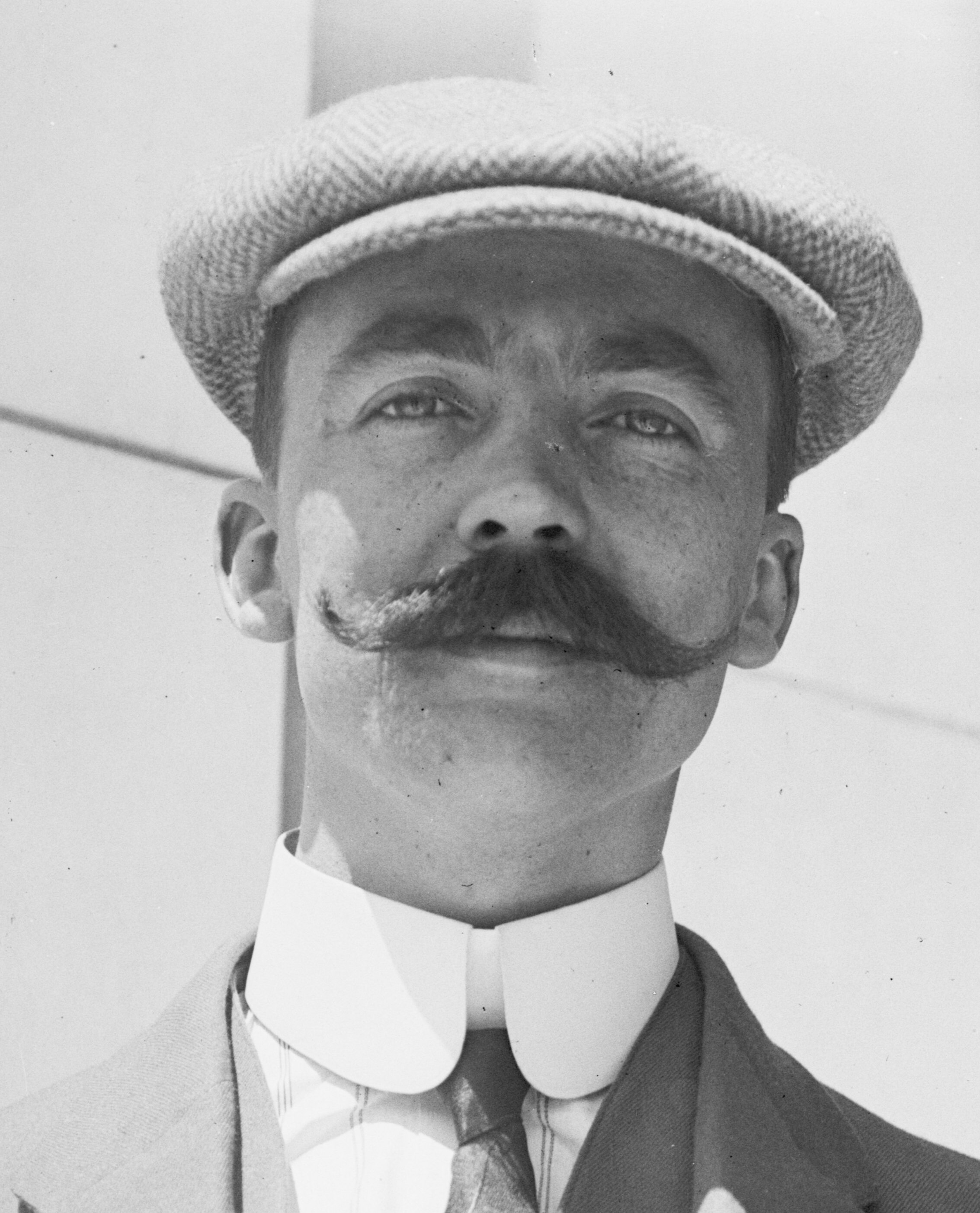
- Ray at the US Inquiry proceedings in Washington, D.C. on 27 April 1912
- Born: 20 June 1879; Southwark, London, England
- Died: 15 January 1977 (aged 97); Billericay, Essex, England
- Known for: One of the oldest male survivors of Titanic, and the longest living surviving crew member
- Spouse: Annie Beatrice Burt (m. 1908; died 1952) Rose Mary Ray (m. 1952)

Frederick Dent Ray (20 June 1879 – 15 January 1977) was one of the last remaining male survivors of the RMS Titanic and was one of the longest living among the surviving crew.

== Early life ==
Frederick Dent Ray was born in Southwark, London, England on June 20, 1879. He was the son of Charles Adolphus Hopson Ray (1847–1913) and Sarah Newport (1848–1919). In 1908, he was married in Berkshire to Annie Beatrice Burt (b.1855) and they remained childless.

== Aboard Titanic ==
Aged 32, Ray boarded the RMS Titanic on 10 April 1912, as a first-class saloon steward for a monthly wage of £3 15p after being redirected from the ship RMS Olympic.

On Sunday, 14 April 1912, his shift ended at 9 pm and he went to room 3 on E-deck, where he slept with 27 others. Awoken by the collision, he first thought it was a problem in the engine room, and he began to drift back to sleep when two stewards arrived to tell people to prepare and go to the lifeboats.

After assisting recalcitrant passengers into Lifeboats 9 and 11, Mr. Ray boarded the half-full Lifeboat 13. As the boat was lowered into the water, a wrapped infant was tossed down to Ray, who caught the child and brought it to safety.

Ray survived the sinking and made it to the ship RMS Carpathia. He returned home to his wife, who was in North Wales for recuperation from ill health.

== Later life ==
Frederick's wife Annie died in 1952. He was remarried a few months later to Rose Mary Ray, née Lawrence (b. 4 December 1890). They spent some time in Maidstone, Kent, before settling in Billericay, Essex, where he spent the rest of his life.

== Death ==
Frederick died in Basildon Hospital on 15 January 1977 following complications from fracturing his hip and was later cremated. Aged 97 years, 6 months and 26 days, he became the longest living among the surviving crew, and his death left only two remaining crewmen, Frank Prentice and Sidney Daniels.
