= Roderick Chisholm (engineer) =

Scottish naval architect (1868 – 1912)

- Born: 20 December 1868; Dumbarton, Scotland
- Died: 15 April 1912 (aged 43); RMS Titanic, Atlantic Ocean
- Occupation: Shipbuilder
- Known for: Naval architect – RMS Titanic
- Spouse: Susan Anderson (m. 1897)
- Children: Alice Chisholm (1897–2002); James Chisholm (1899–1960)

Roderick Chisholm (20 December 1868 – 15 April 1912) was a Scottish ships' draughtsman who served as chief draftsman at Harland & Wolff. He met his demise aboard the RMS Titanic when she sank during her maiden voyage.

He was notable for designing the Olympic class-liners amongst longstanding architect Alexander Carlisle – until his retirement in 1910 – as well as Thomas Andrews.

== Early life and education ==
Chisholm was born in Dumbarton in 1872. Beginning in 1881, the family lived in the village of Old Kilpatrick, in Dunbartonshire, Scotland.

== Occupation ==
in 1891 Chisholm moved to Clydebank. He worked for Harland and Wolff at their Clyde works. The subsequent year, he moved to Belfast to work in their primary shipyards, where he rapidly rose through the ranks, eventually becoming a draftsman.

At some point over the next six years, he met his wife, Susan Anderson, before subsequently marrying her in Lisburn, County Down in 1897; They had two children, Alice in 1897, and James in 1899. They moved into the Pottinger area of eastern Belfast shortly afterwards.

=== Titanic ===
Chisholm worked with Andrews and Carlisle on the design of the Olympic and Titanic, having a paramount role in conceiving her structure. He was selected as one amidst nine other Harland & Wolff employees to witness the smooth operation of Titanic's maiden voyage, in what was known as the "Guarantee Group", a team dedicated towards appointing those who have esteemed themselves in merit throughout the vessels' own development.

Throughout the voyage on Titanic, he participated in regular inspection of her mechanisms as well as functions, routinely writing notes regarding their overall status before disclosing them with Andrews. Should any anomalies have been discovered during the journey, they were swiftly recorded within the ships' entries in the logbook. She then would have undergone immediate changes as soon as possible following the maiden voyage. Chisholm regularly spent his leisure within first class discussing business and politics amongst other passengers.

On the night of 14 April 1912, the Titanic fatally struck an iceberg before sinking two hours and forty-minutes later; Chisholm never survived. His body, if recovered, was never identified. His assets amounted to about 140 pounds, of which his widow became the beneficiary, worth just over £20,000 in modern terms, on 10 June 1912.

== Personal life and legacy ==
In 1897, he married Susan Anderson in Lisburn, County Down; the couple had two children: Alice (1897–2002) and James (1899–1960), both born in Belfast.

His wife remained at Sandford Avenue, in Pottinger (Belfast) for the rest of her life and died on 22 February 1961 at the age of 87. She is buried in Roselawn Cemetery, Belfast, with her son and daughter. His daughter Alice married in Belfast in 1919 with Alfred McCambley (1894–1976) and died on 11 February 2002 at the age of 104 and she is also buried in the Roselawn Cemetery. His son James, never marrying, later followed his own profession as a draughtsman, and received ownership of his late father's residence until he died on 18 September 1960.

== Portrayals ==
- Christopher Patrick Nolan (2005) - Titanic: Birth of a Legend; TV Documentary
