= SS Ottawa =

British Tanker (1888–1921)

History

United Kingdom
- Name: Elbruz (1888–1900); Ottawa (1900–1921)
- Owner: (1888–1895) Lane & Macandrew Ltd. - Petroleum S. S. Co.; (1895–1900) Pembroke & Co. Ltd.; (1900–1921) Anglo-American Oil Co. Ltd.
- Port of registry: London, United Kingdom
- Builder: Armstrong & Mitchell Co. Ltd., Newcastle upon Tyne
- Yard number: 523
- Launched: 27 September 1888
- Christened: 27 September 1888
- Completed: 22 October 1888
- Acquired: 22 October 1888
- In service: 1888
- Out of service: 6 February 1921
- Identification: Official number: 95480
- Fate: Missing since 6 February 1921
- Notes: Call letters: KVNM

General characteristics
- Type: Tanker
- Tonnage: 2,742 GRT
- Length: 94.3 m (309 ft 5 in)
- Beam: 12.3 m (40 ft 4 in)
- Depth: 8.6 m (28 ft 3 in)
- Installed power: One triple expansion steam engine
- Propulsion: 1 screw propeller
- Speed: 12 knots (22 km/h; 14 mph)
- Notes: 3 masts and 1 funnel

SS Ottawa was a British tanker that disappeared in the Atlantic Ocean on 6 February 1921, while she was travelling from Puerto Lobos, Mexico for Manchester, United Kingdom, with a cargo of 3,600 tons of fuel oil.

== Construction ==
Ottawa was built as Elbruz at the Armstrong & Mitchell Co. Ltd. shipyard in Newcastle upon Tyne, England. She was launched on 27 September 1888 and christened by Mrs. Bevan, the wife of her future captain. By that October, the ship was completed and formally turned over to her owners. The ship was 94.3 metres (309 ft 5 in) long, had a beam of 12.3 metres (40 ft 4 in) and a depth of 8.6 metres (28 ft 3 in). She was assessed at 2,742 gross register tons (GRT) and had a single triple expansion steam engine producing 225 nominal horsepower, driving a single screw propeller. The ship could reach a maximum speed of 12 knots (22 km/h; 14 mph) and possessed three masts and one funnel. Her older sister ship, the SS Gut Heil, was constructed for German owners and launched earlier that year on 25 August 1888. Over the course of her career, she passed through five subsequent owners, ultimately being torpedoed and sunk by the USS Trout in mid-1943.

== Career and disappearance ==
Elbruz was sold to Pembroke & Co. Ltd. in 1895 and to Anglo-American Oil Co. Ltd. in 1900 after which she was renamed Ottawa. The ship was chartered by the British Admiralty after the outbreak of World War I in August 1914 and was returned to its owner in December 1918 following the end of the war. In February 1921, Ottawa departed Puerto Lobos, Mexico arriving at Norfolk, United States. She left Norfolk on 2 February en route to Manchester, United Kingdom with a cargo of 3,600 tons of fuel oil. Her last wireless communication occurred with SS Dorington Court on 6 February before she went missing. Ottawa was not the only ship in that area of the Atlantic Ocean that went missing during that period. Both the British cargo ship SS Esperanza de Larrinaga and Italian cargo ship SS Monte San Michele went missing on the same route on 2 February and 8 February respectively. An additional two ships, the Belgian cargo ship SS Bombardier and the French cargo ship SS Victorieux were abandoned on 7 February and 10 February respectively. These events were all attributed to a hurricane sweeping through the area at the time and all the missing ships including Ottawa are presumed lost with all hands although the exact number of crew on board Ottawa at the time of her loss is unknown.

== Titanic connection ==
Ottawa was crossing the Atlantic Ocean when on 6 June 1912, nearly two months after the sinking of RMS Titanic, the crew spotted a body floating in the ocean. A lifeboat was lowered and the body was hauled aboard after which Thomas Cook, the third officer aboard Ottawa, described the body as badly decomposed especially the hands and face while the name of the ship the man came from had washed off his lifebelt. Despite this, it had already become clear to the crew that this was a victim of the Titanic disaster. Still, in order to identify the man, his pockets were searched which resulted in the discovery of the man's wallet bearing the initials W. T. K. and bearing a love letter and a business card. The man was identified as 28-year-old William Thomas Kerley, a 2nd Class Assistant Saloon Steward from Titanic and was found about 543 miles (874 km) from Titanic's wrecksite. Mr. Kerley was given a proper sea burial according to the ceremony of the Church of England. William Thomas Kerley was the second to last victim recovered following the Titanic disaster.
