= Frank Winnold Prentice =

RMS Titanic Crew Survivor

Major Frank Winnold Prentice MC
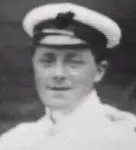
- Prentice as a young man
- Born: 17 February 1889; Downham Market, Norfolk, England
- Died: 19 May 1982 (aged 93); Bournemouth, Dorset, England
- Known for: Second to Last Surviving Crewmember of RMS Titanic
- Spouse: Mabel Riley (m. 1919)
- Children: 3

External videos
- A 1979 BBC interview with Prentice about the Titanic disaster. on YouTube

Major Frank Winnold Prentice MC (17 February 1889 – 19 May 1982) was a British merchant seaman and the assistant storekeeper on the ocean liner RMS Titanic during her maiden voyage. He survived the sinking and at the time of his death was the penultimate surviving crew-member of the disaster.

== RMS Titanic ==
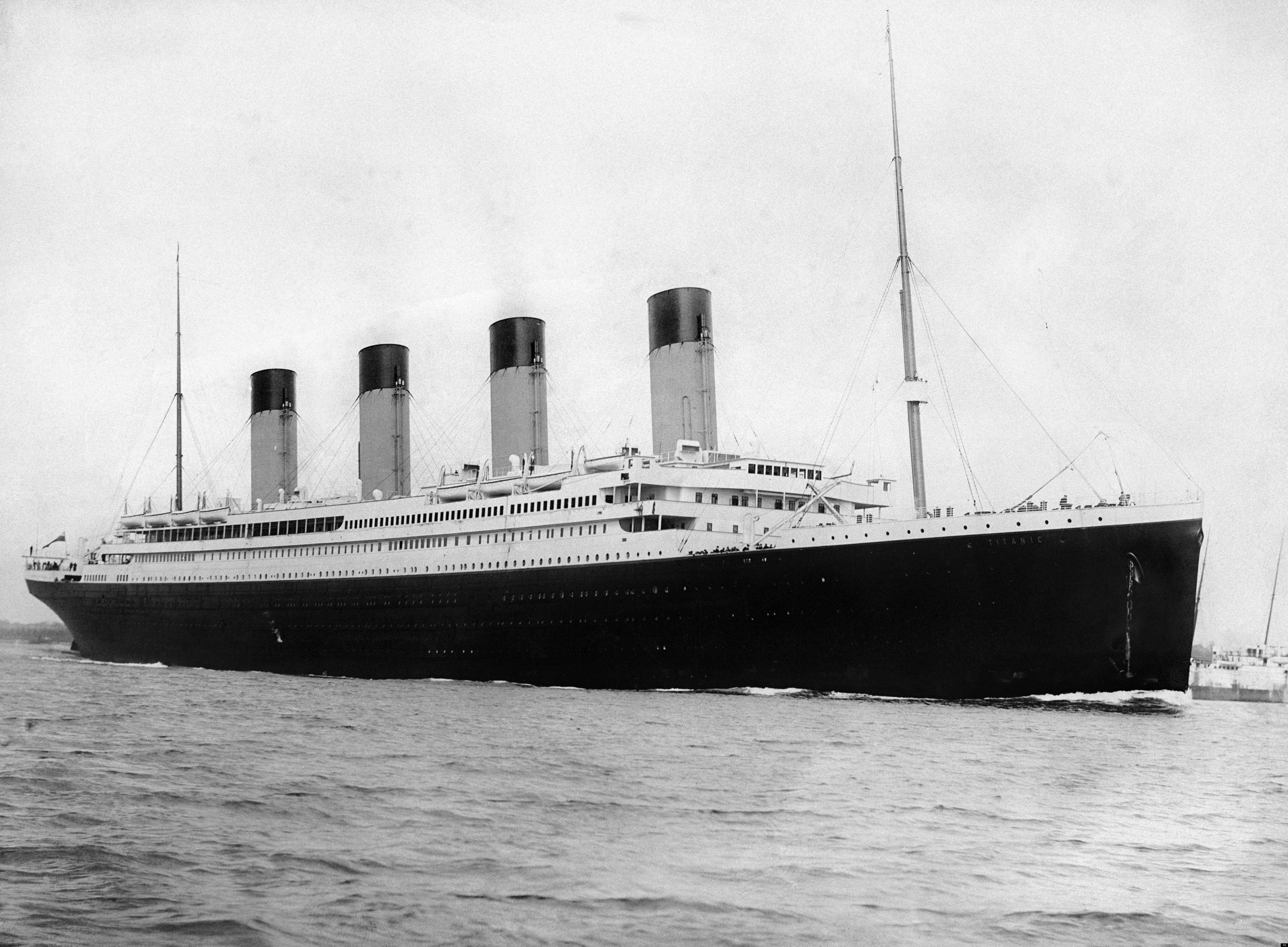
RMS Titanic departing Southampton on 10 April 1912.

Prentice signed on to Titanic's crew on 4 April 1912 as an assistant storekeeper, having transferred from another White Star liner, Celtic. He boarded Titanic in Southampton on 10 April 1912 and the ship set sail for New York that same day.

On 14 April 1912 at 11.40 pm, the RMS Titanic struck an iceberg and began to sink. At the time of the collision, Prentice was in his berth on the port side of E deck talking to one of the five fellow storekeepers with whom he was sharing the cabin. He had not felt the impact with the iceberg, but he had noticed that the ship had stopped. Prentice headed up to the promenade deck to investigate and found the forward well deck covered in chunks of ice, which had fallen from the iceberg due to the collision. An hour after the collision, the Titanic's crew started preparing and lowering the lifeboats with mainly women and children. Prentice assisted in the loading of the lifeboats and had to reluctantly part women from their husbands and also helped first-class passenger Virginia Estelle Clark put on a lifejacket before convincing her to board lifeboat 4.

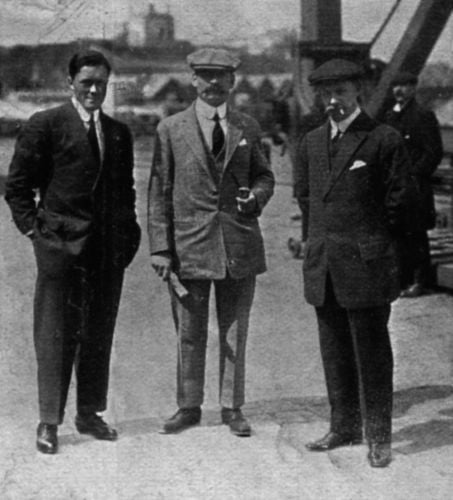
Prentice with fellow surviving crewmembers Edward Brown (centre) and William Lucas (right), after returning to England

By 2.05 am, all the lifeboats had left the Titanic, save for collapsibles A and B which were stored on the roof of the officers' quarters. Prentice however moved aft and ended up on the port side of Titanic's crowded poop deck alongside his colleagues Cyril Ricks and Michael Kieran. The three men discussed what they would do next and they agreed to jump from the ship before she sank. The men climbed over Titanic's railing and Prentice noticed the large amount of debris and number of people floating nearby. Kieran jumped first, followed by Ricks and eventually at 2.20 am, Prentice jumped from the rapidly sinking stern and fell about 30 metres (100 feet) into the icy Atlantic, narrowly avoiding Titanic's propellers on the way down. When Prentice resurfaced, he was unhurt, having avoided hitting any debris or people when he landed in the water. Soon thereafter he found Ricks, but he had seemingly hit some debris upon landing in the water and was seriously injured. Prentice stayed with him until he succumbed to his wounds. Prentice was not able to find Kieran and decided to keep swimming, bumping into many bodies along the way.

Eventually, he found lifeboat 4, which had stayed near the ship as it sank, and was pulled aboard by its occupants. Once on board, he met Mrs Clark again, who wrapped her cloak around him, possibly saving his life. Very cold from the time he spent in the water, Prentice tried to drink a bottle of whisky, but it was thrown out by Quartermaster Walter Perkis, who was in charge of the boat. Prentice was one of seven swimmers picked up by lifeboat 4, although two later died from exposure during the night.

Lifeboat 4's occupants were picked up by the rescue ship RMS Carpathia at 8 am, and Prentice was taken straight to the ship's infirmary. Carpathia arrived in New York on 18 April 1912, where Prentice disembarked alongside the other surviving crew. He returned to England on the SS Lapland with the crew not held back for the American inquiry.

== Later life ==
Following the sinking of the Titanic, Prentice returned to the United Kingdom and signed on to serve on the RMS Oceanic on 10 July 1912. En route to New York, the Oceanic found Titanic's collapsible A lifeboat adrift in the Atlantic and recovered it. When the First World War broke out in 1914, Prentice was still serving on Oceanic and was on board when she was wrecked just ten days into her military service. He subsequently enlisted in the Royal Engineers later transferring to the Royal Tank Corps, becoming a major and earning a Military Cross.

Following the war, Prentice moved to Bournemouth and married Mabel Riley (1897–1996) in 1919. The couple went on to have three children.

Prentice continued to work at sea during the 1920s, even serving several times on Titanic's sister ship RMS Olympic. In his later life, Prentice would give many interviews about his Titanic survival for television, newspapers and magazines. He was also interviewed for the British documentary Titanic: A Question of Murder in 1982. One keepsake he had held from the Titanic disaster and frequently showcased during his interviews, was his pocket watch which had stopped at 2:20 AM, shortly after the time that he had hit the water after jumping from the Titanic.

== Death ==
Prentice died aged 93 on 19 May 1982 in Bournemouth, Dorset, England. He was cremated and interred at the North Cemetery. At the time of his death, Prentice was the second-to-last surviving crewmember of the Titanic. This left Sidney Edward Daniels (1893–1983) as the last surviving crewmember of the Titanic.
