= Storekeeper =

United States Coast Guard enlisted rating

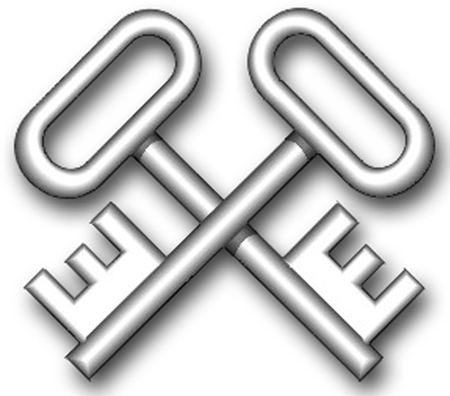
- Rating insignia
- Issued by: United States Coast Guard
- Type: Enlisted rating
- Abbreviation: SK
- Specialty: Administration

Storekeeper (SK) is an enlisted rating in the United States Coast Guard; until 2009 it was also a United States Navy rating, the most common supply rate in U.S. Navy vs. CS (culinary specialist) and SH (Ship's Serviceman) and very much equivalent to the MOS 92 of the U.S. Army. In the Navy this rating, together with PC (postal clerk), has been renamed or superseded by the rating logistics specialist (LS).

== Function ==
Substantiated in 1916, Storekeepers are tasked with maintaining ship or company military supply stores. Their responsibilities generally include purchasing and procurement, shipping and receiving, and issuing of equipment, tools, consumable items or anything else obtained through the Federal Stock System.

== Chain of command ==
Storekeepers that fall under the authority of a supply officer are attached permanently or temporarily to a supply department, either ashore or afloat. There are exceptions to this practice as was the case of the Independent Storekeeper NEC which trains E-5 and above to operate independent of a supply officer, such as, or while deployed with surface or aviation units that operate in remote areas where no supply officer is present. Additionally, in Aviation Squadrons, the storekeeper falls under the chain of command of the Aircraft Maintenance Officer and his designate; the Maintenance Material Control Officer. The best example of this is the Storekeeper(s) tasked with operating the Naval Air Station Sigonella Weapons Department in Sicily, Italy. The department, a semi-autonomous entity within NAS Sigonella, is headed by a weapons officer to whom the Storekeepers report. Since there is no supply officer within a weapons department either ashore, or afloat, the tasks of material control, inventory control, financial accounting, material custody, issuing, receiving and warehousing and disposition actions all fall within the storekeeper's scope of work, validating, initiating and signing requisitions falls upon the Independent Storekeeper.

== Rank and recognition ==
Storekeepers are referred to, as all other Coast Guard rates, by rate and rank combined. If a sailor is a Petty Officer Third Class holding the rate of Storekeeper, he or she would be referred to as Storekeeper Third Class or more commonly, SK3. With the recent merger of Storekeepers (SK) and Aviation Storekeepers (AK), Storekeepers can be found serving any Naval platform. For this reason, Storekeepers can be found with virtually every warfare pin offered by the Navy with only a few exceptions. Of the warfare qualification held by storekeepers, included are Aviation Warfare (AW), Surface Warfare (SW), Seabee Combat Warfare (SCW), Submarine Warfare Specialist (SS). The SK rate is also a source rating for Explosive Ordnance Disposal, the Navy SEALS, Navy Divers and SWCC. Thus Storekeepers can be stationed virtually anywhere and take on diverse duties.

== Training ==
Storekeepers are trained at the Naval Technical Training Center in Meridian, Mississippi. Undesignated or non-rate sailors may also strike for SK without attending NTTC Meridian's Storekeeper "A" School. Coast Guard Storekeepers get training in Petaluma, California.

== Rating merger ==
Effective 1 October 2009, The Ratings of Storekeeper (SK) and Postal clerk (PC) in the Navy have merged to become Logistics Specialist (LS).
