= Titanic Collapsible Boat B =

Lifeboat from the RMS Titanic

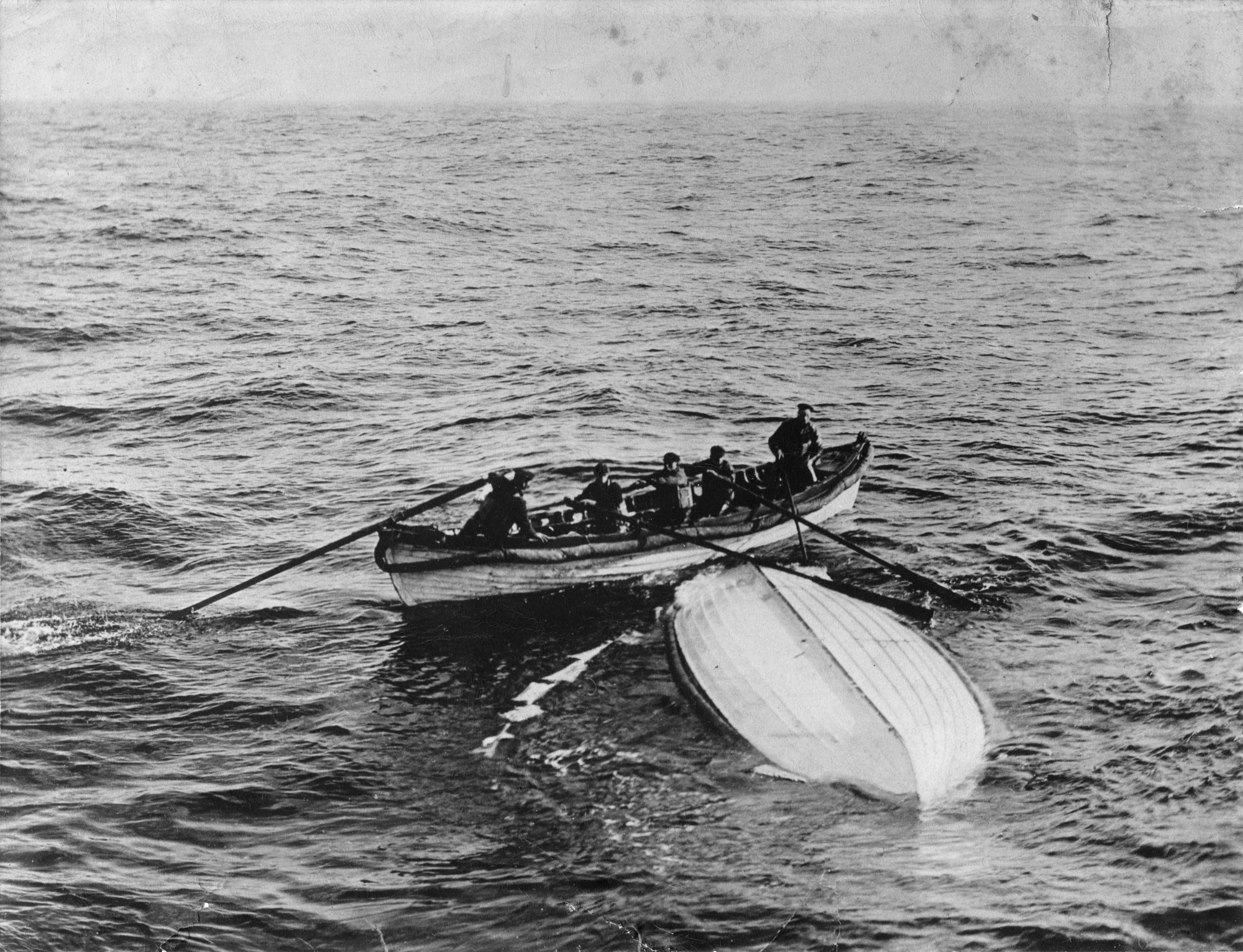
Collapsible Boat B, found adrift by the ship Mackay-Bennett during its mission to recover the bodies of those who died in the disaster.

Collapsible Boat B was a lifeboat from the Titanic. It was one of the last boats launched to sea, over two and a half hours after the Titanic collided with an iceberg and began sinking on 14 April 1912. Collapsible B could not be successfully launched, and it was washed off deck and upside down when the Titanic made her final plunge at 2:20 a.m. It carried mostly men, including Second Officer Charles Lightoller, who took command of the boat until being picked up by others who came to their rescue.

== Description ==
Collapsible Boat B was located on the port side of the ship and was one of the four "collapsible" Engelhardt lifeboats. They were boat-shaped unsinkable rafts made of kapok and cork, with heavy canvas sides that were raised to form a boat. These "collapsible" boats measured 27 ft 5 in (8.36 m) long and 8 ft (2.4 m) wide by 3 ft (0.91 m) deep. Their capacities were of 376.6 cubic feet (10.66 m^{3}) and each could carry 47 people. Inspired in a Danish design, they were built by McAlister & Son of Dumbarton, Scotland. Their equipment was similar to that of the cutters, but they had no mast or sail, had eight oars apiece and were steered using a steering oar rather than a rudder.

All four Collapsible Boats were launched between 2:00 and 2:15 a.m., with only one from each side of the ship getting safely to sea. Collapsible Boat C (starboard) was launched at 2:00 a.m. with about 43 people on board, including J. Bruce Ismay. Captain Smith ordered quartermaster George Rowe to board and take command of the raft. Collapsible Boat D (port) was also successful in its launching at 2:05 a.m., carrying about 20 people, and under the command of quartermaster Arthur Bright.

The other Collapsible Boat A was washed away like Collapsible B, but without anyone taking charge. It had around 14 survivors when assisted by other lifeboats, including Rhoda Mary Abbott and R. Norris Williams.

== History ==
Collapsible Boat B was located on the roof of the officers' quarters. At around 2:00 a.m., Lightoller and other crew members tried to take it down by using a makeshift ramp with oars, but the improvised ramp broke, and the boat landed upside-down on the ship's flooding deck. Lightoller and other seamen, as well as stewards and even passengers, attempted to right the collapsible, but they were unable to do that due to the Titanic beginning her final plunge at around 2:15 a.m. By that time, Lightoller decided to jump into the water and swam towards Collapsible B, discarding his heavy Webley Revolver, which impeded him from swimming properly. He was nearly killed when a funnel fell and crushed many of those in the water. The subsequent wave washed off Collapsible B to sea and further away from the sinking ship. At least 12 men were clinging to its ropes, including Lightoller, junior wireless operator Harold Bride, and American colonel Archibald Gracie IV, while chief baker Charles Joughin remained to a side of the boat until he was rescued by another lifeboat, suffering from swollen feet due to the cold when he was rescued by the Carpathia. Bride was briefly trapped beneath the boat before being able to emerge and stand on board. Approximately 30 men managed to get on the upside-down raft, with Lightoller taking command and instructing them how to balance the weight to avoid buckling and sinking the collapsible.

The men aboard endured hours in the freezing temperatures, often reciting the Lord's Prayer, until around 4:30 a.m., when one of the occupants (possibly Gracie) called to Lightoller and pointed to the horizon, where they saw that some lifeboats were near. Lightoller took a whistle from his pocket and attracted the attention of two of these boats (boat #4 and boat #12). Mess steward Cecil Fitzpatrick also used his whistle to call at the lifeboats nearby. Around 28 men were subsequently rescued by these boats, with Lightoller taking 16 of them into boat #12 and lifeboat #4 taking the other 11 occupants of Collapsible B, which was left adrift in the ocean. At least 27 of them were alive when the Carpathia rescued them on the morning of 15 April. (Note: It is believed, according to Harold Bride's testimony, that senior wireless operator Jack Phillips was on board, but died during the night. However, later in life, he said Phillips ran to the ship's stern after they abandoned the Marconi room and that he never saw him again.) On 20 April 1912, the CS Mackay-Bennett, which had been sent to the sinking area to recover bodies, spotted Collapsible B still floating.

== Occupants ==
The full list of survivors who were on board Collapsible B is not known, and some of those who reached the boat died from exposure to the cold during the night. This is a list of known passengers and crew who were saved by the upside-down Collapsible B. The rest of passengers have been individually referenced in their respective cells.

The Titanic had three classes (First, Second, and Third), aside from the crew. No second-class passenger boarded Boat B.

- First Class passenger
- Third Class passenger
- Crew member

Name	Age	Class/Dept	Notes
Barkworth, Mr. Algernon Henry	47	First Class	British justice of the peace. He died in 1945.
Bride, Mr. Harold Sydney	22	Victualling Crew	Bride was the junior telegraphist on board the Titanic. He died in Scotland in 1956, at the age of 66.
Collins, Mr. John	17	Victualling Crew	Kitchen worker, known as "scullions" on the Titanic. He contracted syphilis and died at a mental hospital in Belfast in 1941.
Daly, Mr. Eugene Patrick	29	Third Class	Irish farmer emigrating to the United States. He later returned to Ireland before finally settling in the US to live with his daughter in New York City. Died in 1965.
Daniels, Mr. Sidney Edward	18	Victualling Crew	Daniels served as a third-class steward. He was the last surviving crew member of the Titanic when he died in May 1983.
Dorking, Mr. Edward Arthur	18	Third Class	British vaudeville emigrating to the United States to live with relatives in Oglesby, Illinois. He was an openly gay man.
Fitzpatrick, Mr. Cecil William	21	Engineering Crew	Mess steward, responsible for preparing and serving meals for the rest of the crew. He died in 1964.
Gracie IV, Colonel Archibald	53	First Class	American colonel. He wrote the first book about the sinking of the Titanic, and was among the first survivors to die in December 1912.
Hebb, Mr. William Albert Thomas	22	Engineering Crew	Trimmer. He died aged 42 in 1932.
Hurst, Mr. Walter	23	Engineering Crew	Fireman. Died in 1964.
Joughin, Mr. Charles John	33	Victualling Crew	Chief baker on board the Titanic. He died in 1956.
Lightoller, Mr. Charles Herbert	38	Officers	Second officer. He was the most senior crew member of the Titanic to survive the sinking. Unofficially in charge of Collapsible B.
Lindsay, Mr. Charles William	20	Engineering Crew	Fireman. Died in 1960.
Maynard, Mr. Isaac Hiram	31	Victualling Crew	Cook. He was one of the last persons to see Captain Smith alive. Died in 1948.
McGann, Mr. James "Jimmy"	29	Engineering Crew	Trimmer. He discredited the theories of Captain Smith's suicide as "unfounded", having seen him directing the lifeboats on deck. Died from pneumonia in 1918.
O'Connor, Mr. John	29	Engineering Crew	Trimmer. Died aged 51 in 1933.
O'Keeffe, Mr. Patrick	21	Third Class	Irish man emigrating to the United States. He served for the British Army in Canada during World War I and returned later to the US, where he became a naturalized US citizen, and died aged 49 in December 1939 in New York.
Prangnell, Mr. George Alexander	30	Engineering Crew	Greaser. Served in World War I and received the Mercantile Marine Medal. Died aged 71 in 1953.
Senior, Mr. Harry	31	Engineering Crew	Fireman. He was interviewed by The New York Times on 19 April 1912. Died aged 56 in 1937.
Snow, Mr. Eustace Philip	21	Engineering Crew	Trimmer. He died in 1966.
Sunderland, Mr. Victor Francis	20	Third Class	British emigrant to Canada. He was the man who asked the occupants of Collapsible B to recite the Lord's Prayer. Died in Toronto in 1973.
Thayer, Mr. John Borland Jr.	17	First Class	American teenager. His mother Marian Thayer had escaped earlier on board boat #4, while his father John Borland Thayer perished in the sinking. (Note: In the dark, Thayer's mother Marian, who had escaped on board lifeboat #4, didn't realize that her son Jack was right on the next boat (#12) when they assisted the survivors on Collapsible B. Mother and son were reunited on the Carpathia. Jack later praised the crewmen on board Collapsible B, while another First-Class survivor on Boat B —Algernon Barkworth—, was impressed by Thayer's behavior, describing him in an interview as a "clear-cut chap.")
Whiteley, Mr. Thomas Arthur	18	Victualling Crew	First-Class saloon steward. He was severely injured in the sinking. Died during WW2 in Italy in 1944.

== Later life of Boat B occupants ==
=== Crew members ===
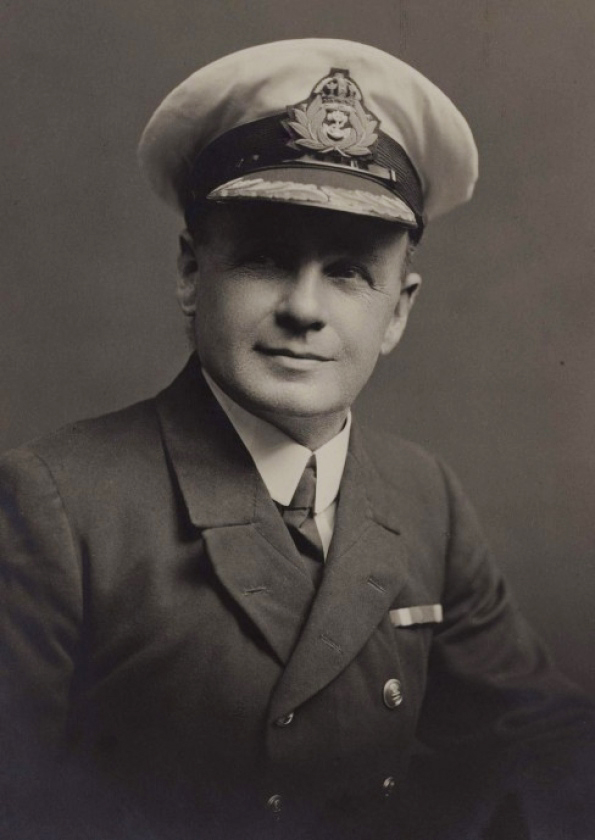
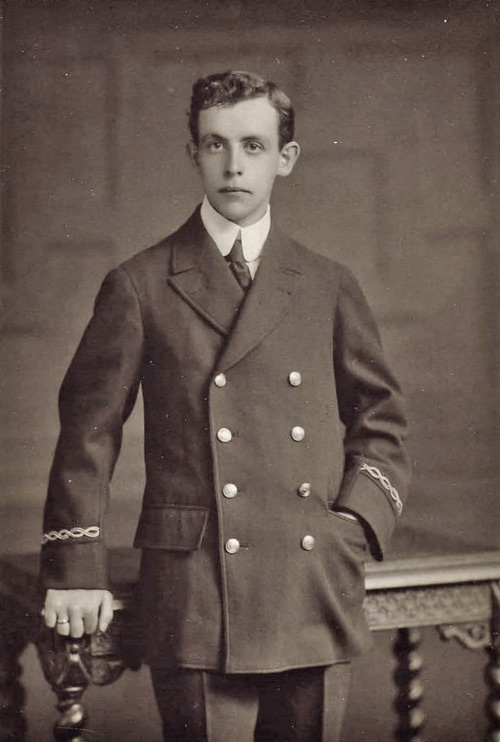
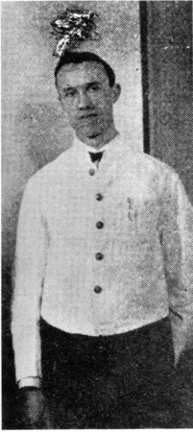
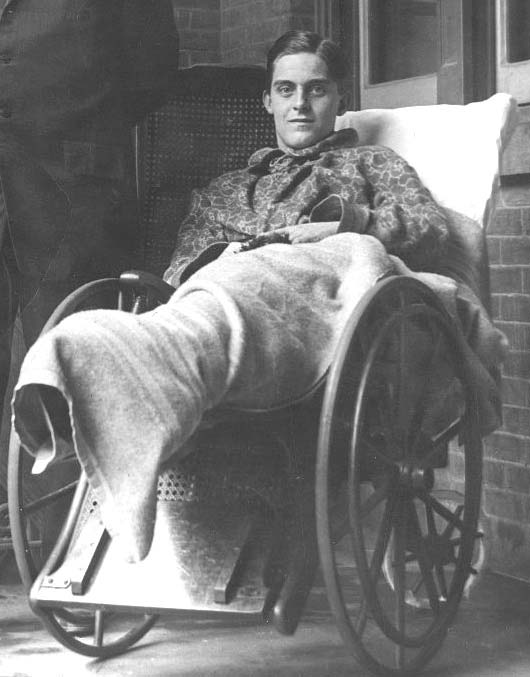
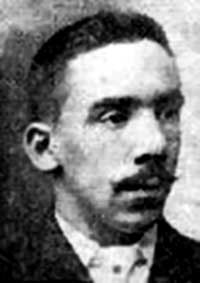
(from left to right): Crew members aboard Collapsible B included Second Officer Charles Lightoller, who was the most senior crew to survive the sinking, junior wireless operator Harold Bride, and Steward Sid Daniels, who was the last surviving crew member upon his death in May 1983. Thomas Whiteley served in both world wars, dying at the Italian front in 1944, while Chief Baker Joughin became a citizen of the United States and died in New Jersey in 1956.

Second Officer Charles Lightoller was the most senior crew member to survive the sinking of the Titanic. Lightoller was one of the main witnesses during the American and British inquiries into the disaster and was known as a strict enforcer of the rule "women and children first", which Lightoller interpreted at times as "women and children only", with Canadian major Arthur Peuchen being the only adult male passenger that he permitted to board a boat, mainly because Peuchen offered to assist in the oars of Lifeboat No. 6. Lightoller was decorated for his service in World War I and further distinguished himself in World War II, when he commanded the Sundowner yacht during the Dunkirk evacuation. Lightoller died in London in 1952.

Wireless junior officer Harold Bride was severely injured by the frost, but upon rescue by the Carpathia, Bride helped Harold Cottam, the ship's telegraphist, to deliver messages from surviving passengers. Bride later developed a friendly relationship with Cottam. He testified at the US Senate Inquiry and the British Investigation into the sinking, and later served in World War I. Bride died in Glasgow in 1956.

Third-Class steward Sidney Edward "Sid" Daniels served in World War I, where he was severely injured. He went on to become the last surviving crew member at the time of his death in May 1983.

Steward Cecil Fitzpatrick, who used a whistle to draw attention to Collapsible B from boats nearby, gave it to Lillian Bentham, an American Second-Class passenger on board lifeboat #12, who heard the sound and alerted those in charge of #12. Bentham subsequently took personal care of Fitzpatrick when he was brought aboard lifeboat #12. He died in Leeds, West Yorkshire in 1964.

Fireman Walter Hurst acquainted himself and corresponded with American author Walter Lord, collaborating with information for Lord's 1955 book A Night to Remember. Hurst also appeared on BBC Television in 1956, where he was interviewed by presenter Peter West. He died aged 76 in Harefield, Southampton in May 1969.

Chief baker Charles Joughin became famous for drinking whisky prior to jumping to the sea. Similar to Fireman Walter Hurst, Joughin was actively involved with Walter Lord in the writing of A Night to Remember. He became a naturalized US citizen and died in New Jersey in 1956.

Many of the rest of the crewmen who were rescued aboard Collapsible B served in World War I, with Trimmer Jimmy McGann and cook Isaac Maynard being among the last persons to see Captain Smith alive. McGann discredited the theory of Captain Smith's suicide, saying that Smith jumped to the sea before the ship's final plunge. Four of his grandnephews became professional actors in the UK: Joe (born 1958), Paul (born 1959), Mark (born 1961), and Stephen (born 1963). McGann died from pneumonia in 1918, at the age of 36.

Steward Thomas Whiteley sued the White Star Line and served in World War I and World War II. He died at the Italian front in October 1944, while serving with the Royal Air Force.

Shortly before his death, Greaser George Prangnell saw and strongly disliked the 1953 movie Titanic, calling it an "eyewash".

Kitchen worker John Collins befriended British-Canadian steward Emma Bliss and Canadian Second-Class passengers Elizabeth Mellenger and her daughter Violet Madeleine. Collins arranged a meeting with them in Toronto in April 1939, and died two years later at a mental hospital in Belfast, after a short battle against syphilis.

=== Passengers ===
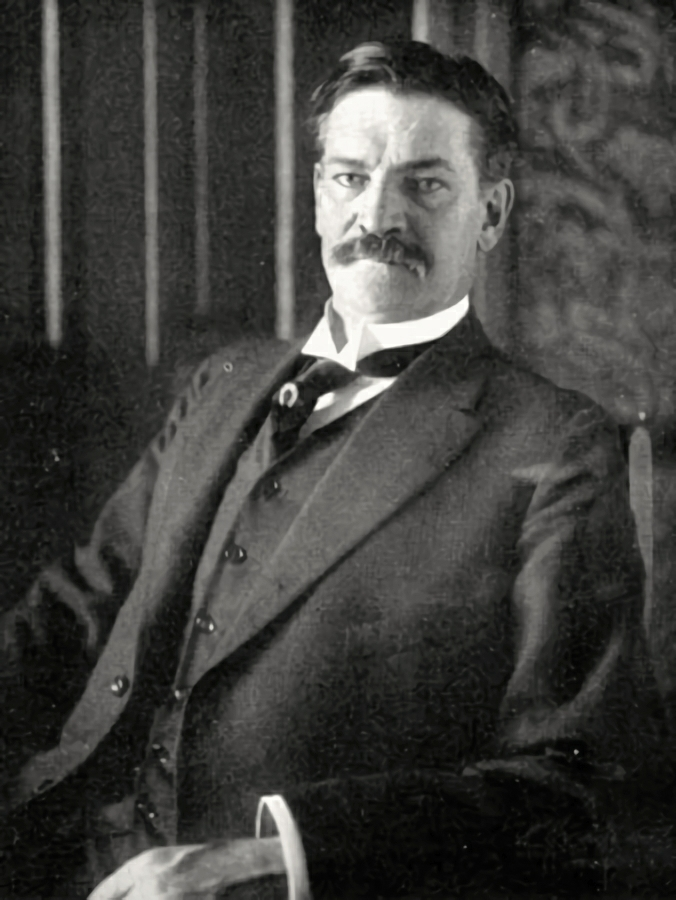
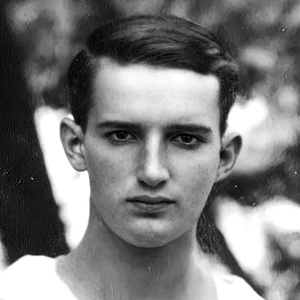
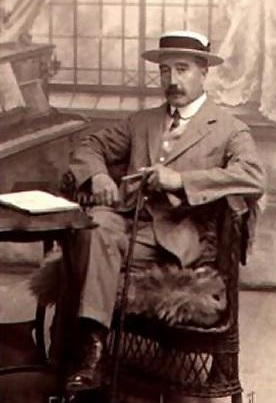
(from left to right): American passengers Archibald Gracie IV and Jack Thayer, as well as British justice A.H. Barkworth, were the only three First-Class passengers to reach Collapsible B. Edward Arthur Dorking was one of the third-class passengers on board.

American Colonel Archibald Gracie IV was strongly impacted by the consequences of the sinking of the Titanic. He was among the first persons to write a book about the disaster, and was one of the first survivors to die aged 54 in December 1912.

Another prominent First-Class passenger on board Collapsible B was 17-year-old Jack Thayer, who wrote a book about the Titanic in the 1940s. Thayer served in the Meuse-Argonne front for the U.S. Army during World War I. He subsequently graduated from the University of Pennsylvania and worked in the business world until his death. Thayer committed suicide in September 1945 in Philadelphia, after struggling with depression due to his son's death in the Pacific War of World War II in 1943 and the death of his own mother Marian in 1944.

Among the Third-Class passengers on board, Irishman Eugene Daly said that an officer shot and killed two men, before killing himself. He died in New York City in 1965. Another was Edward Arthur Dorking, a UK-born artist who later served in World War I and World War II for the U.S. Army. He was an openly gay man and died in a California prison in 1954. Patrick O'Keffee became a naturalized US citizen and died in New York City in December 1939 at the age of 49. Sunderland lived the rest of his life in Toronto, Canada. He disputed the 1958 film A Night to Remember, as well as many of the facts stated by Lord in his account of the tragedy. Sunderland wrote his testimony of that night. He died in August 1973.

== In popular culture ==
Collapsible B is featured in the 1958 film A Night to Remember and in the 1996 miniseries Titanic. In the 1997 James Cameron film Titanic, Collapsible B is seen when Lightoller (Jonny Phillips) orders to take it down from the roof the officers' quarters. The scene shows it sliding down the oars and breaking them, subsequently smashing onto deck. In the same film, Charles Joughin (Liam Tuohy) is shown drinking whisky while on the ship's stern, during the final plunge of the Titanic. He is shown alongside Jack Dawson (Leonardo DiCaprio) and Rose DeWitt Bukater (Kate Winslet), the main characters of the film.

Bernard Fox, a Welsh actor who portrayed Gracie in the 1997 blockbuster, had previously featured as lookout Fleet in the 1958 movie A Night to Remember.

== See also ==
- Titanic Emergency Boat No. 1

== Bibliography ==
- Bancroft, James W. (2024). Titanic's Unlucky Seven: The Story of the Ill-Fated Liner's Officers. Pen & Sword Books. ISBN 9781036102555.
- Bancroft, James W. (2025). Titanic's Lifeboats: Disaster and Survival During the Great Liner's Sinking. Pen & Sword Books. ISBN 9781036123635.
- Burlingame, Jeff (2012). The Titanic Tragedy: The Price of Prosperity in a Gilded Age. Routledge. ISBN 9781608704507.
- Butler, Daniel Allen (1998). Unsinkable. Stackpole Books. ISBN 978-0-8117-1814-1.
- Cox, Spencer D. (1999). The Titanic Story: Hard Choices, Dangerous Decisions. Open Court Publishing Company. ISBN 9780812693966.
- Eaton, John P.; Haas, Charles A. (1994). Titanic: Triumph and Tragedy. Patrick Stephens. ISBN 978-1-85260-493-6.
- Gill, Anton (2010). Titanic: The Real Story of the Construction of the World's Most Famous Ship. Channel 4 Books. ISBN 9781905026715.
- Hutchings, David F.; de Kerbrech, Richard P. (2011). RMS Titanic 1909–12 (Olympic Class): Owners' Workshop Manual. Sparkford, Yeovil: Haynes. ISBN 978-1-84425-662-4.
- Koldau, Linda Maria (2014). The Titanic on Film: Myth versus Truth. McFarland & Company. ISBN 9780786490370.
- Medhurst, Simon (2023). Titanic: Day by Day 366 Days with the Titanic. Pen & Sword Books. ISBN 9781399011440.
- Molony, Senan (2000). The Irish aboard Titanic. Wolfhound Press. ISBN 9780863278051.
- Russell, Gareth (2019). The Ship of Dreams: The Sinking of the Titanic and the End of the Edwardian Era. Atria Publishing Group. ISBN 9781501176722.
- Ruffman, Alan (2013). Titanic Remembered: The Unsinkable Ship and Halifax. Formac Publishing Company Limited. ISBN 9781459502956.
- Tibballs, Geoff (1997). The Titanic: The Extraordinary Story of the 'unsinkable' Ship. Carlton Books. ISBN 9781856132695.
- Winocour, Jack (2012). The Story of the Titanic As Told by Its Survivors. Dover Publications. ISBN 9780486131245.
- Wormstedt, Bill; Fitch, Tad (2011). Halpern, Sam (ed.). An Account of the Saving of Those on Board. Stroud, UK: The History Press. ISBN 978-0-7524-6210-3.
