= Jack Thayer =

Titanic survivor (1894–1945)

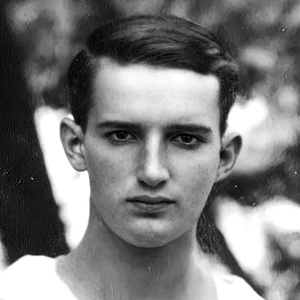
- Thayer in 1915
- Born: John Borland Thayer III; December 24, 1894; Philadelphia, Pennsylvania, U.S.
- Died: September 20, 1945 (aged 50); Philadelphia, Pennsylvania, U.S.
- Known for: Titanic survivor
- Spouse: Lois Buchanan Cassatt (m. 1917)
- Children: 6
- Parent(s): John B. Thayer and Marian Thayer
- Military career
- Allegiance: United States
- Branch: United States Army
- Service years: 1917–1918
- Conflicts: World War I; Western Front; Meuse–Argonne offensive

John Borland Thayer III (December 24, 1894 – September 20, 1945) was a first-class passenger on RMS Titanic who survived the ship's sinking. Aged 17 at the time, he was one of only a handful of passengers to survive jumping into the frigid ocean. He later wrote and privately published his recollection of the sinking.

== Early life ==
He was born into the Thayer family, a wealthy Boston Brahmin family. He was the son of John Borland Thayer II, a director and a second vice president of the Pennsylvania Railroad Company and his wife, Philadelphia socialite Marian Thayer.

== Aboard Titanic ==
Seventeen-year-old Thayer had been traveling in Europe with his parents and a maid named Margaret Fleming. They boarded the RMS Titanic at Cherbourg on Wednesday, April 10, 1912, to return to New York. Jack's stateroom, cabin C-70, adjoined his parents', C-68. Shortly after 11:40 p.m. on April 14, after the ship collided with the iceberg, he dressed and went to a deck on the port side to see what had happened. Finding nothing, he walked to the bow, where he could faintly make out ice on the forward well deck.

Thayer woke his parents, who accompanied him back to the port side of the ship. Noticing that the ship was beginning to list to port, they returned to their rooms to put on warmer clothes and life vests. They returned to the deck, but Thayer lost sight of his parents. After a brief search, he presumed they had boarded a lifeboat. Thayer soon met Milton Long, a fellow passenger he had met just hours before. Thayer proposed jumping off the ship, as he was a good swimmer, but as Long was not, he initially opposed jumping.

As the ship began listing more, the two men went ahead with attempting to jump off the side, intending to swim to safety. Long went first, jumping while facing the ship; he perished. Thayer launched himself from the rail, his back facing the ship, and pushing outward. Once in the water, Thayer was able to reach Collapsible B, one of the last lifeboats to be launched; it was also overturned as a large wave had swept it off the deck before it could be lowered into the water. He and other crew and passengers, including Junior Wireless Officer Harold Bride, Colonel Archibald Gracie IV, Chief Baker Charles Joughin, and Second Officer Charles Lightoller (who was the most senior surviving crew member), were able to keep the overturned boat steady for some hours. Thayer later recalled that the cries of hundreds of people in the water reminded him of the high-pitched hum of locusts in his native Pennsylvania.

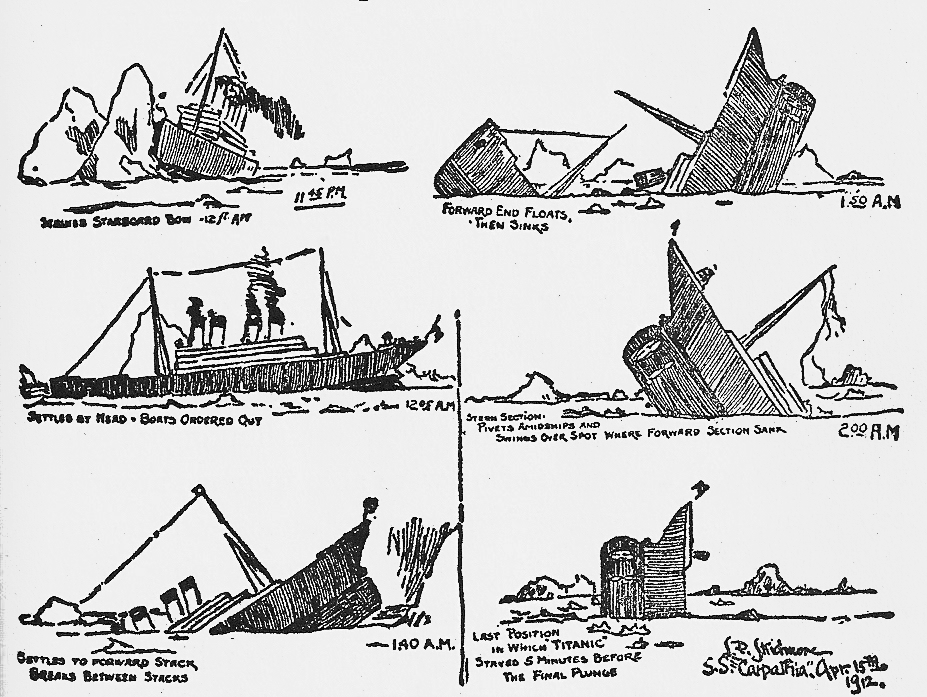
The sinking, based on Thayer's description. Sketched by L. P. Skidmore on board Carpathia

After spending the night on the overturned Collapsible B, Thayer was pulled to safety into Lifeboat 12. He was so distraught and frozen that he did not notice his mother in nearby Lifeboat 4; nor did she notice him. Lifeboat 12 was the last lifeboat to reach the RMS Carpathia, the first rescue ship to arrive at the scene, at 8:30 a.m. Thayer's father did not board a lifeboat and perished in the sinking. Thayer was one of about 40 persons who jumped or fell into the water and survived.

In his privately published 1940 account of the sinking, Thayer recalled what life was like before the Titanic sank, "There was peace and the world had an even tenor to its way. Nothing was revealed in the morning the trend of which was not known the night before. It seems to me that the disaster about to occur was the event that not only made the world rub its eyes and awake but woke it with a start keeping it moving at a rapidly accelerating pace ever since with less and less peace, satisfaction and happiness. To my mind the world of today awoke April 15th, 1912".

== Later life and death ==
Thayer graduated from the University of Pennsylvania, where he was a member of the fraternity Saint Anthony Hall. On December 15, 1917, Thayer married Lois Buchanan Cassatt, daughter of Edward B. Cassatt and Emily L. Phillips. Her grandfather was Alexander Johnston Cassatt, who was president of the Pennsylvania Railroad and whose sister was the artist Mary Cassatt. The couple had two sons, Edward Cassatt and John Borland IV, and three daughters: Lois, Julie, and Pauline. A third son, Alexander Johnston Cassatt Thayer, died a few days after his birth in 1920. During World War I, Thayer served as an artillery officer in the U.S Army.

In 1939, Thayer became treasurer of the University of Pennsylvania, and was appointed to the newly created office of financial vice president in February 1944, a position he held until his death in September 1945.

During World War II, both of Thayer's sons enlisted in the armed services. Edward, a bomber pilot, was listed as missing and presumed dead after his plane was shot down in 1943 in the Pacific theatre. His body was never recovered. When the news reached Thayer, he became extremely depressed.

Thayer's mother Marian died on April 14, 1944, on the 32nd anniversary of Titanic collision and sinking. Her death seemed to push him even further into a downward spiral. Thayer died by apparent suicide on September 20, 1945. He was found in an automobile at 48th Street and Parkside Avenue in West Philadelphia, his throat and wrists cut. He was buried at the Church of the Redeemer Cemetery in Bryn Mawr, Pennsylvania.

His daughters Julie Vehr and Pauline Maguire said in an interview that Thayer struggled with his mental health (depression) and that their mother tried to get medical help for him.

== Titanic accounts ==
In 1940, Thayer self-published his experiences of the sinking of the RMS Titanic in a pamphlet titled The Sinking of the S.S. Titanic; 500 copies were printed for family and friends. Oceanographer Robert Ballard used Thayer's account to help determine the final location of the shipwreck. The discovery helped prove that the ship had split in half before sinking. Thayer, among many other survivors, including crew members, reported it breaking into two pieces, but others reported it sinking in one piece, and the question remained unsettled until the wreck was found.

Thayer's account is sometimes included with fellow survivor Archibald Gracie IV's account of the sinking, in modern editions of Gracie's book Titanic: A Survivor's Story.

== Portrayals ==
- Nicholas Young (1979) – S.O.S. Titanic; TV film
- Fred Lancaster (2011) – Curiosity: What Sank Titanic?; TV episode
- Ryan Hawley (2012) – Titanic; TV series
- Rhys Mannion (2025) – Titanic Sinks Tonight; TV miniseries

== See also ==
- Passengers of the RMS Titanic
