= Sidney Daniels =

RMS Titanic crew survivor

Sidney Edward Daniels
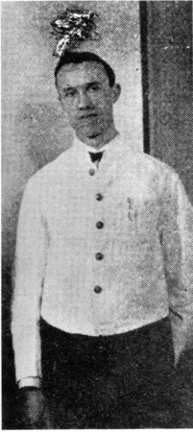
- Daniels onboard the RMS Olympic in 1911
- Born: 19 November 1893; Portsmouth, Hampshire, England
- Died: 25 May 1983 (aged 89); Portsmouth, Hampshire, England
- Known for: Last surviving crewmember of RMS Titanic
- Spouses: Gertrude Jessie Edbrooke (m. 1916; died 1918); Alfreda Kathleen Clements (m. 1920)
- Children: 7

External videos
- Titanic Survivor Sidney Daniels - Southampton City Council Interview (1982). on YouTube

Sidney Edward Daniels (19 November 1893 – 25 May 1983) was a British man who served as a third-class steward on the ocean liner RMS Titanic during her ill-fated maiden voyage. He survived the sinking and, at the time of his death, was the last surviving crew member of the disaster.

== Early life ==
Sidney Edward Daniels was born on 19 November 1893 in Portsmouth, Hampshire, England, as the second youngest of nine children of police sergeant Walter James Daniels and Louisa Mary Hunter. Daniels had four brothers and four sisters, two of his sisters passed away while he was a young boy. His father retired from the police force when Daniels was four years old in 1897 and instead started running a pub. Daniels went to school until he was 13 1/2 years old, when his brother quit a job as a page boy at the Royal Albert Yacht Club in Southsea and Daniels' mother encouraged him to go to school in the mornings and work as a page boy in the afternoon. He held this job for two years before being fired in 1909. His mother fell ill before dying in 1911, the same year Daniels landed a job as a plate washer during the maiden voyage of the RMS Olympic. He fulfilled this job for two of Olympic's voyages before becoming a third-class steward instead with a salary of £3.50 a month. Daniels was on board Olympic when she collided with HMS Hawke on 20 September 1911.

== RMS Titanic ==
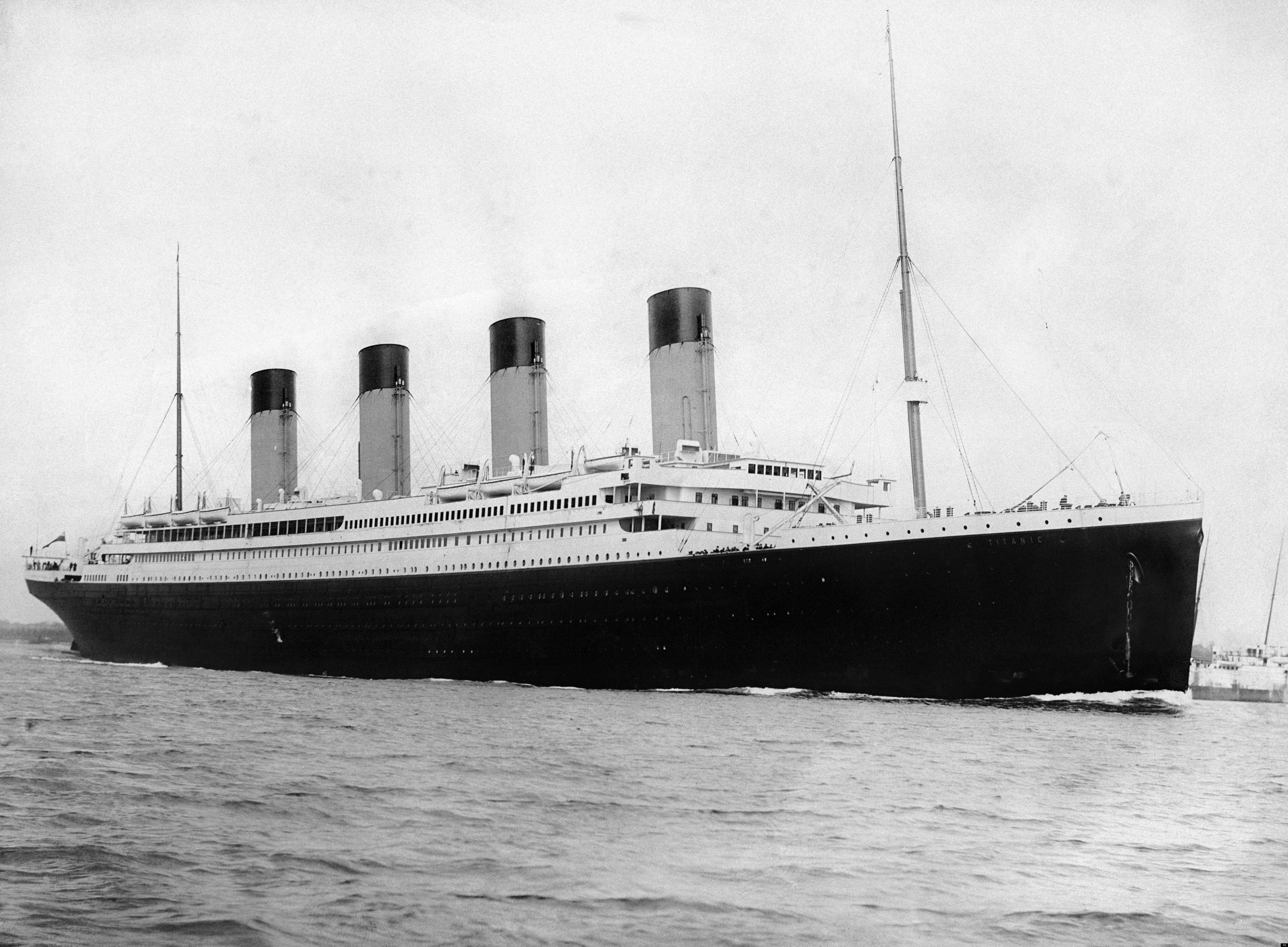
RMS Titanic departing Southampton on 10 April 1912.

Daniels remained working on the Olympic until a number of crew, including Daniels and his friend and fellow third class steward Francis Edbrooke, were selected to be transferred for service on the maiden voyage of the Olympic's sistership RMS Titanic. Daniels signed on to Titanic's crew on 4 April 1912 in Belfast as a third-class steward and felt proud to be part of such a wonderful ship. Titanic departed Southampton for New York on 10 April 1912.

Daniels recalled the voyage being smooth and quiet until Titanic struck an iceberg on 14 April 1912 at 11.40 pm and began to sink. At the time of the collision, Daniels, his friend Edbrooke, and other stewards were sleeping in their bunks in the open berthing room on the port side of F deck just aft of the bottom of the First Class grand staircase. Neither had felt the impact of the iceberg, nor were they awoken by it. They were instead woken up by a night watchman, who told them to get their lifebelts on and come up to the boat deck. At first, Daniels and his colleagues believed the disturbance was merely a emergency boat drill and were therefore irritable due to their interrupted sleep. Daniels remembered the lifeboat that had been allotted to him in case of an emergency (Lifeboat No. 13) and went to stand by it while he and the other stewards awaited orders and danced to the tune of the ship's orchestra, which was playing on deck. Eventually, Daniels and his fellow third-class stewards got orders to get all the women and children from steerage up to their lifeboats and assist in loading them. Daniels got as many passengers up to the boat deck as possible and helped load them into Lifeboat No. 13, but had to forfeit his place in the lifeboat in favour of the ship's passengers, and only now did the severity of the situation become clear to him. Daniels assisted in loading the other lifeboats until all had been launched aside from Collapsible A and B, which were stowed upon the Officers' Quarters. Daniels approached the site of Collapsible B on the port side when a crewmember shouted from up on the Officer's Quarters if anyone had a pocketknife in order to cut the lashes that bolted the Collapsible to the deck. Daniels answered the call and handed his pocketknife over to the crewman, who then proceeded to cut the lifeboat loose before it was pushed off the roof by a group of crewmen and landed upside down on the boat deck.

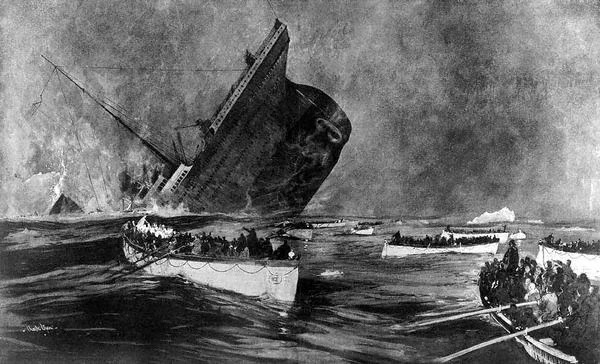
Titanic's final moments

Daniels, in the meantime, wandered over to the starboard side as he had noticed the ship's port list, and as he neared the bridge, Titanic took her final plunge. Water quickly rushed up the boat deck, and Daniels stood knee-deep in the icy seawater before deciding to abandon ship. He jumped up onto the taffrail beside a davit and dived into the water, swimming away from the ship as he feared to be dragged under by the suction of the foundering vessel. A short while later, Daniels found a lifebuoy with another man already clinging to it and looked around, witnessing the Titanic's stern rising out of the water and told the man to swim away from the suction as they were still too close to the Titanic. He and the other man both swam towards a black spot in the darkness, which turned out to be the upturned Collapsible B with a crowd of men on it. Daniels managed to climb onto it and sat up on the keel of the lifeboat, while the other man was only able to partially climb onto the lifeboat and died from exposure later that night. From the Collapsible, Daniels watched the Titanic's funnels collapse and heard an explosion whereupon he witnessed the Titanic breaking in half before her stern rose straight up in the air and sank beneath the waves. Daniels and the roughly 30 other men on the boat went on to cite the Lord's Prayer together as they were awaiting rescue during the night. After that, Daniels told the man who was sitting behind him on the keel that he was tired and wanted to go to sleep. The other man berated him and told him to stay awake, as he would not wake again if he dared sleep now. By the time dawn arrived, Daniels spotted the rescue ship RMS Carpathia heading toward them and exclaimed that he could see two ships coming to their rescue; the other ship Daniels saw turned out to be one of the nearby icebergs. Thanks to the rising daylight, Lifeboats No. 4 and 12 spotted the upturned Collapsible and rescued the men from the stricken lifeboat. After their rescue, the lifeboats proceeded toward the Carpathia which took aboard all Titanic survivors.

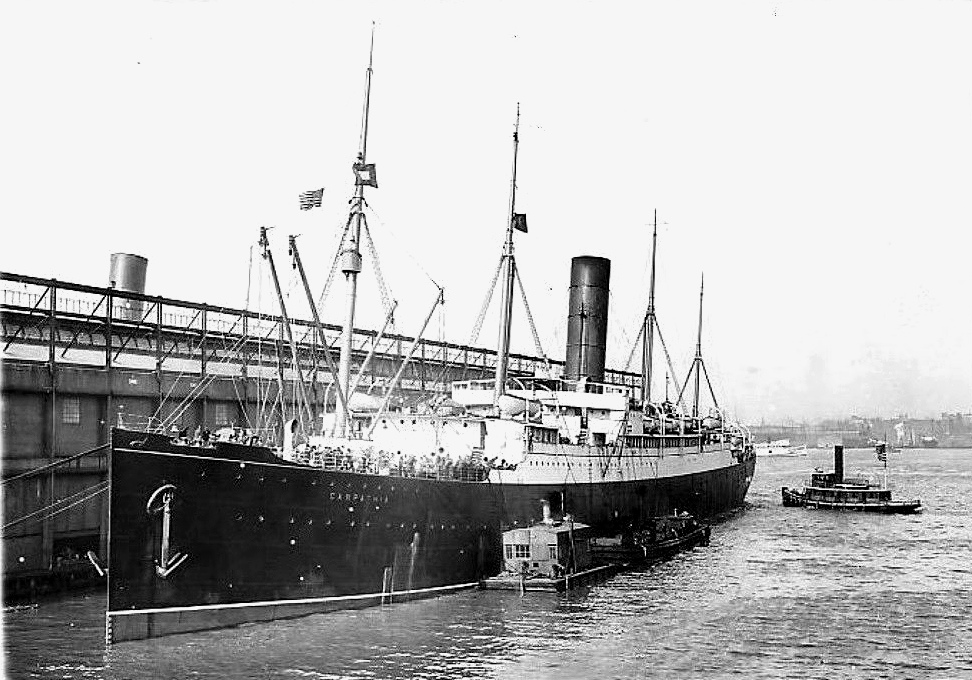
RMS Carpathia in New York on 18 April 1912

Daniels was handed coffee when first boarding Carpathia and despite hating the beverage, he still drank it as it was something that could at least warm him up. He was subsequently taken to the ship's infirmary and lay shivering in one of the beds, which caused him to miss a crew roll call, and led to his being initially reported missing rather than saved. Carpathia arrived in New York on 18 April 1912, where Daniels disembarked alongside the other surviving crew and was taken back to Plymouth aboard the SS Lapland. While on the Lapland, Daniels sends a telegram to his father saying "Safe, SS Lapland, Sid", confusing his father as he believed his son was in the country of Lapland and had to look it up on a map. A few days later, Daniels' father received a letter from the White Star Line informing him that his son was missing, confusing the man again until a patron at his pub joked, "Oh, can't you tell the handwriting on the cablegram?" Daniels returned home shortly thereafter and was instructed by the White Star Line to stay on standby in case they'd be called upon to testify at any court hearings or enquiries. But Daniels was never called up to testify and six months after the Titanic disaster, Daniels returned to sea, again working as a third class steward on the RMS Olympic.

== World War I ==
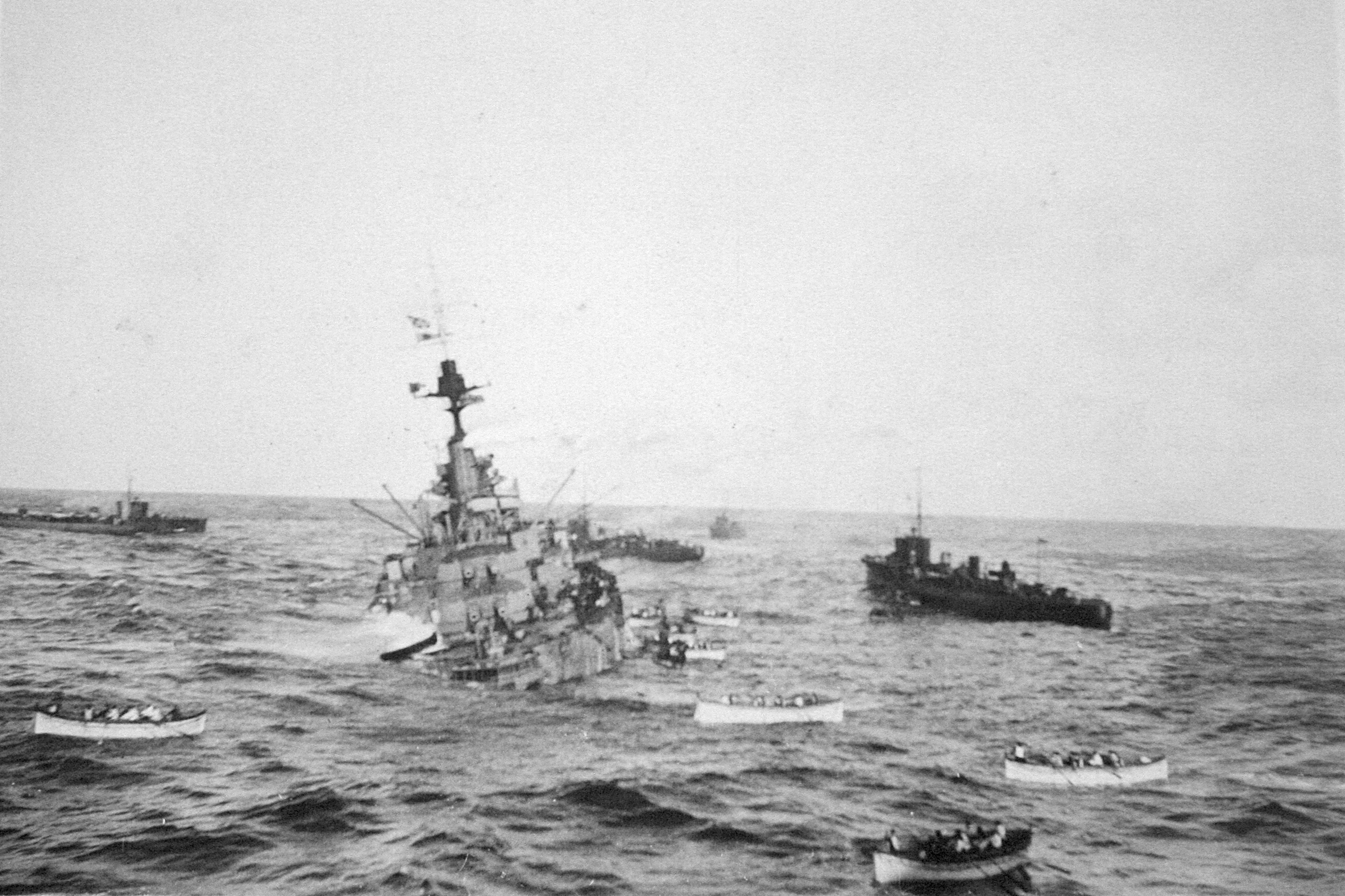
The battleship HMS Audacious after striking a German mine, picture taken by passengers from the Olympic on 27 October 1914.

Daniels remained with the Olympic as the First World War broke out in August 1914. He was on board the Olympic when the ship rescued the crew of the stricken HMS Audacious on 27 October after the battleship had run into a German mine. Olympic arrived at Belfast on 2 November and the White Star Line decided to lay her up there until the war was over. This motivated Daniels to join the Royal Army Service Corps on 11 November 1914 and was stationed at the coast for defence work against enemy aircraft. He fulfilled this duty until 1915, as, much to his chagrin, he did not see direct combat. The following year, Daniels married Gertrude Jessie Edbrooke, the sister of his lost Titanic colleague Francis Edbrooke. Daniels was then sent to the western front in France and served as a Royal Engineer, digging trenches for the soldiers to fall back on. While serving in this role on 6 June 1918, Daniels was struck by an anti-aircraft shell that badly injured his leg. He remained in Netley hospital for the remainder of the war, being discharged on 6 December 1918, the same year his wife passed away. Daniels had also lost two brothers during the war as one was Killed in action at the Battle of Jutland and the other's plane was shot down by enemy fire.

== Later life ==
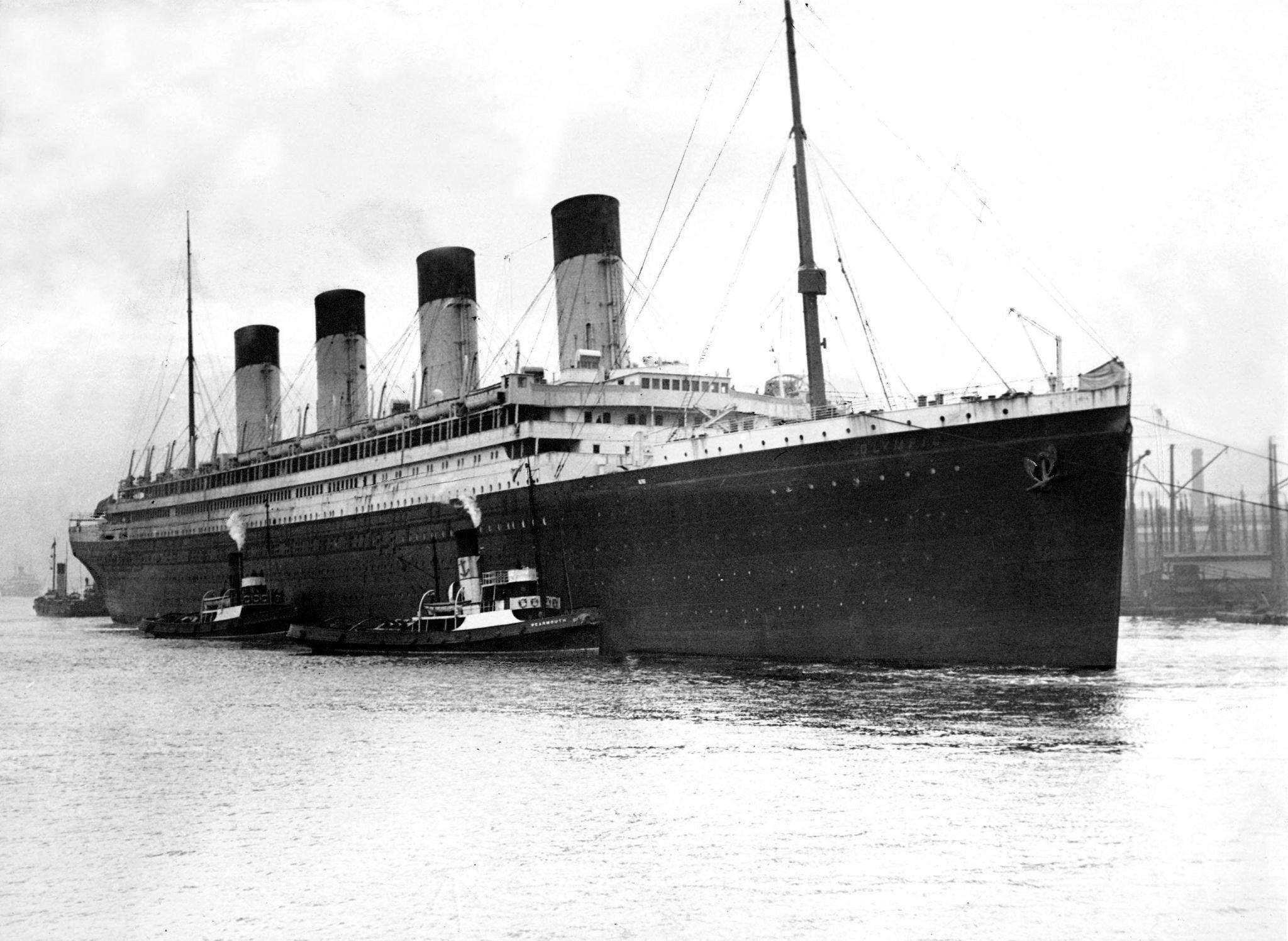
RMS Olympic in 1935

After recovering from his war wounds, Daniels remarried with Alfreda Kathleen Clements in 1920 before returning to work as a steward on Olympic on 25 June of that same year as the Olympic returned to passenger service. Daniels worked himself up during his service on the Olympic, becoming a second class steward before being promoted to a first class waiter, a first class steward, a bedroom steward and finally a cabin steward. Daniels was even selected alongside two others to serve the Prince of Wales when he sailed on board Olympic. Between 1922 and 1938, Daniels became father to seven children. He stayed in service on the Olympic until she was sold for scrap in 1935 and then served on RMS Berengaria until she too was scrapped in 1939. Daniels served in the merchant navy during World War II, and after the end of the war in 1947, he retired from sea travel and instead took a docking job at the Naval Dockyard in his hometown. Daniels retired in 1962, and it was only during his later years that he was able to open up and talk about his experiences on the Titanic as the loss of so many of his shipmates affected him greatly. Following the death of Leo James Hyland on 14 June 1974, Daniels became the last surviving male Titanic steward, and upon the death of Frank Winnold Prentice on 19 May 1982, Daniels became the last surviving crewmember of the RMS Titanic.

== Death & legacy ==
Daniels died aged 89 on 25 May 1983 in Portsmouth, Hampshire, England. At the time of his death, he was the last surviving crewmember of the Titanic. One keepsake that Daniels had held from the Titanic disaster, was a set of keys from his locker on F deck. His family auctioned off the keys in 2017 for £76,000 and in 2025, a memorial plaque was unveiled at his former home in Portsmouth in the presence of his youngest daughter.

== Sources ==
- Chirnside, Mark (2011). The 'Olympic' Class Ships. The History Press. p. 94. ISBN 978-0-7524-5895-3.
- Chirnside, Mark (2004). The Olympic-Class Ships. Stroud: Tempus. ISBN 978-0-7524-2868-0.
