= Edward Dorking =

English Titanic survivor (1893–1954)

- Dirking in an undated photo
- Born: Edward Arthur Dorking; June 18, 1893; Stamford Hill, Middlesex, England
- Died: April 12, 1954 (aged 60); San Pedro, California, U.S.
- Military career
- Allegiance: United States
- Branch: U.S. Army
- Service years: 1917—1919; 1942—1945
- Conflicts: World War I; World War II

Edward Arthur Dorking (June 18, 1893 – April 12, 1954) was a passenger on RMS Titanic and a survivor from the sinking. Originally from England, he toured the United States and Canada with a vaudeville show. He then fought in World War I and World War II, surviving both. He died in prison in 1954.

== Biography ==
Edward Arthur Dorking was born on June 18, 1893, in Stamford Hill, Middlesex, England, the son of Edward Arthur Dorking (born 1867), a policeman, and Florence Derby (born 1876).

Dorking boarded the Titanic at Southampton on April 10, 1912, as a Third Class passenger. He was emigrating to the United States to live with his uncle and aunt, Fred and Violet Cooke, in Oglesby, Illinois. He survived the sinking swimming for 35 minutes to Collapsible B and was later rescued by the Carpathia. He testified before the United States investigating committee and the British investigation.

According to his relatives, Dorking was openly gay and that was the reason why the family was sending him off to the United States.

After the sinking Dorking appeared on theaters with a tour of the Sullivan & Considine circuit, talking about the experience, like at Princeton, New Jersey, Fort Collins, Colorado, Salt Lake City, Utah, Ogden, Utah, San Francisco, California, Los Angeles, California, Portland, Oregon, Decatur, Illinois, Moline, Illinois, Tacoma, Washington, Davenport, Iowa, and Vancouver. He described his profession as "Vaudeville". According to him, none of the victims was to receive damages from the White Star company, and that was the reason why he was touring the theaters, to repay what he had lost.

Dorking enlisted into the United States Army in 1917 and was discharged in 1919.

After World War I he moved to Los Angeles, apparently after a run-in with the police in Chicago. In 1933 he was still living in Los Angeles and with his military pension entered a soldier's home in Sawtelle, Los Angeles.

He was drafted in 1942 to fight in World War II. Estranged from his family, Dorking spent his final days in prison on Terminal Island, San Pedro, California, and died on April 12, 1954, three days before the forty-second anniversary of the Titanic's sinking.

In 2024, British theatremaker Russell Lucas made a show about Edward's life called 'Third Class'.
