= Marian Thayer =

American socialite and survivor of the sinking of the RMS Titanic

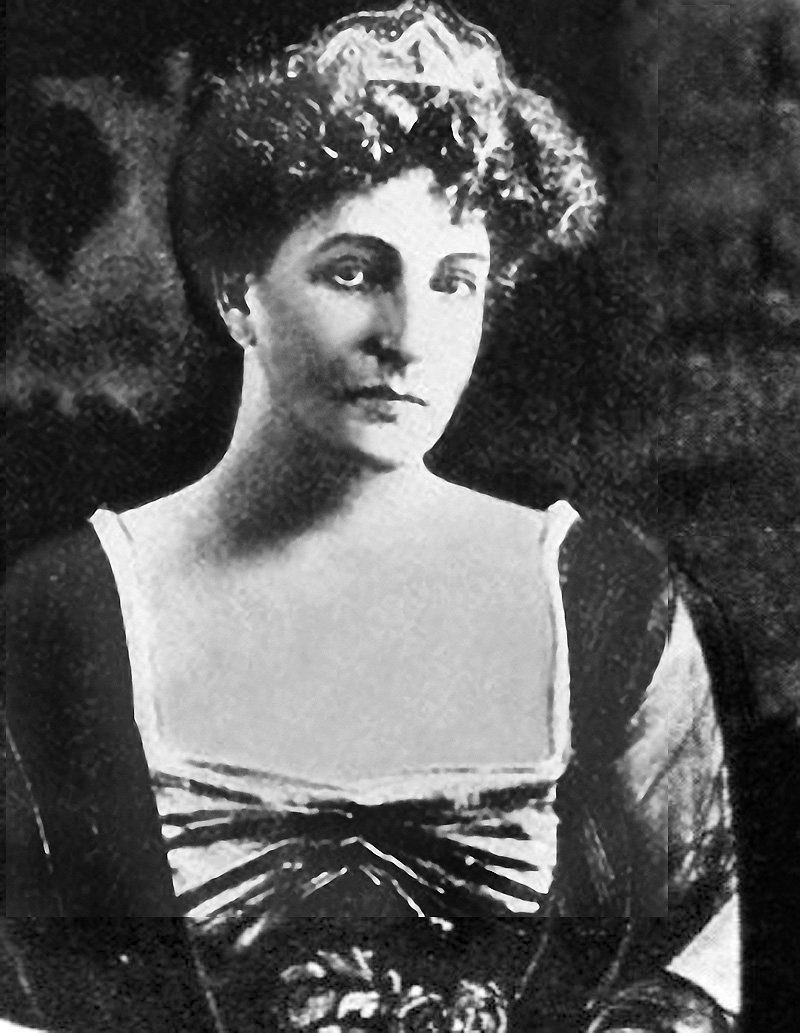
- Marian Thayer circa 1900
- Born: Marian Longstreth Morris; November 9, 1872; Philadelphia, Pennsylvania, U.S.
- Died: April 14, 1944 (aged 71); Haverford, Pennsylvania, U.S.
- Known for: Titanic survivor
- Spouse: John Borland Thayer (m. 1892; died 1912)
- Children: 4, including Jack Thayer

Marian Longstreth Thayer (née Morris; November 9, 1872 – April 14, 1944) was an American socialite and survivor of the sinking of the RMS Titanic. She was the wife of John Borland Thayer II, a director and second vice president of the Pennsylvania Railroad Company, and the mother of John Borland "Jack" Thayer III. In 1912, all three of them, along with their maid Margaret Fleming, were passengers on RMS Titanic maiden voyage when it struck an iceberg and sank. Marian, Jack III, and Fleming all survived, but John II died.

== Early life ==
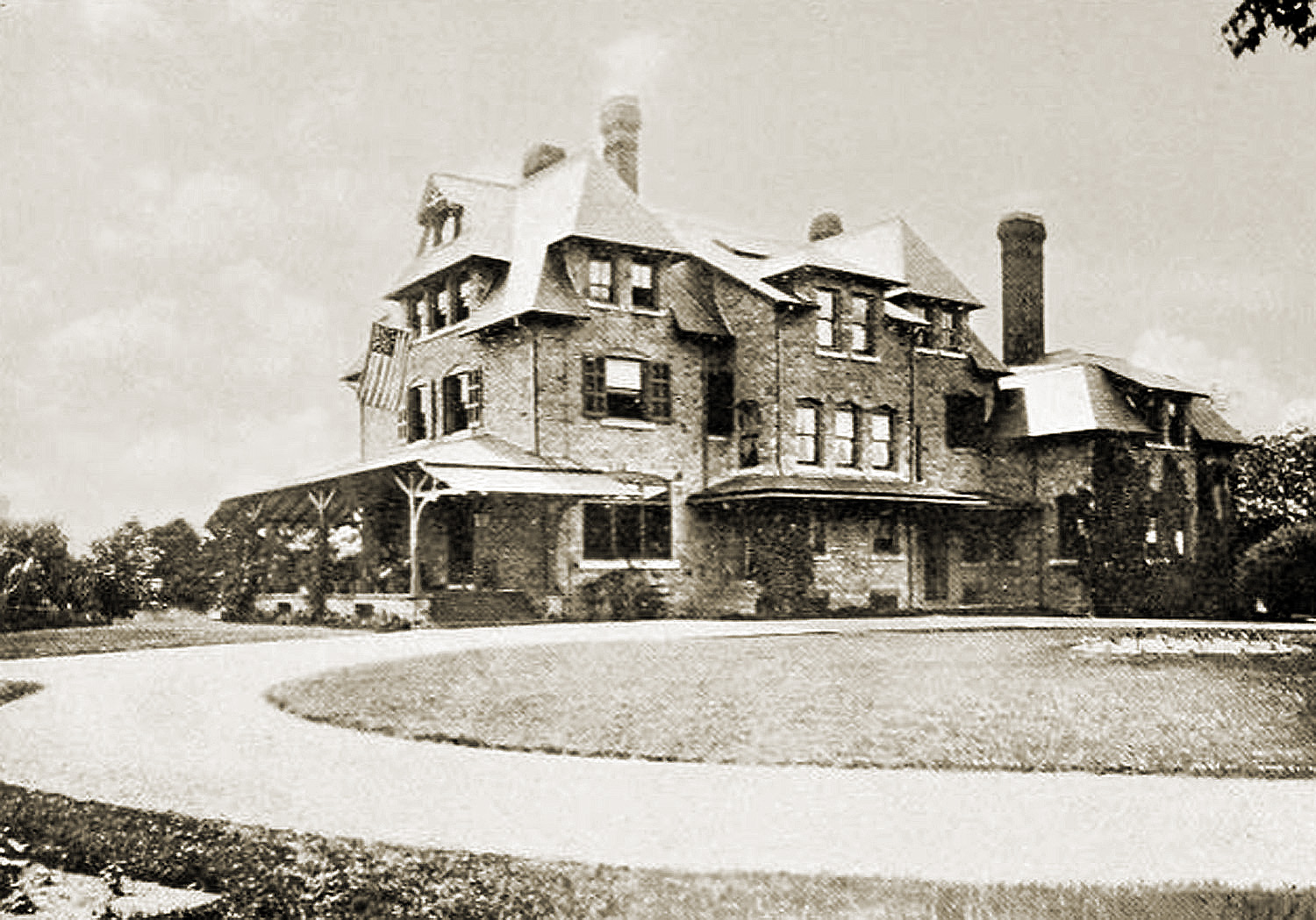
The house on the Dundale Estate, Villanova where Marian spent much of her childhood.

Marian Longstreth Morris was born in 1872, in Pennsylvania. Her father was Frederick Wistar Morris, and her mother was Elizabeth Flower Paul. Marian was one of seven children, three boys and four girls.

Her father Frederick was part of the Morris family firm of Morris Wheeler and Co., which was a prosperous iron and steel company. Her grandfather, Israel Morris II, who owned the firm, bought the Dundale Estate at Villanova, Pennsylvania as a country residence for himself and his children. On this estate he built numerous large houses for his sons, one of which was for Frederick. It was in this house that Marian spent much of her childhood.

In 1892, at the age of 20, Marian married John Borland Thayer, who at that time was a clerk in railway administration and ten years her senior. Over the years John was progressively promoted, and he eventually became Vice President of the Pennsylvania Railroad.

The couple had four children, two daughters and two sons, including Jack Thayer (1894–1945). He was the only one of Marian and John's children to travel with them on the Titanic.

The family lived in Haverford in a very large house called Redwood. The Federal Census shows that in 1910, Margaret Fleming was employed by the Thayer family as a maid. She travelled with John, Marian, and Jack in 1912 when they went to Europe and returned home with them on the Titanic.

== On board Titanic ==
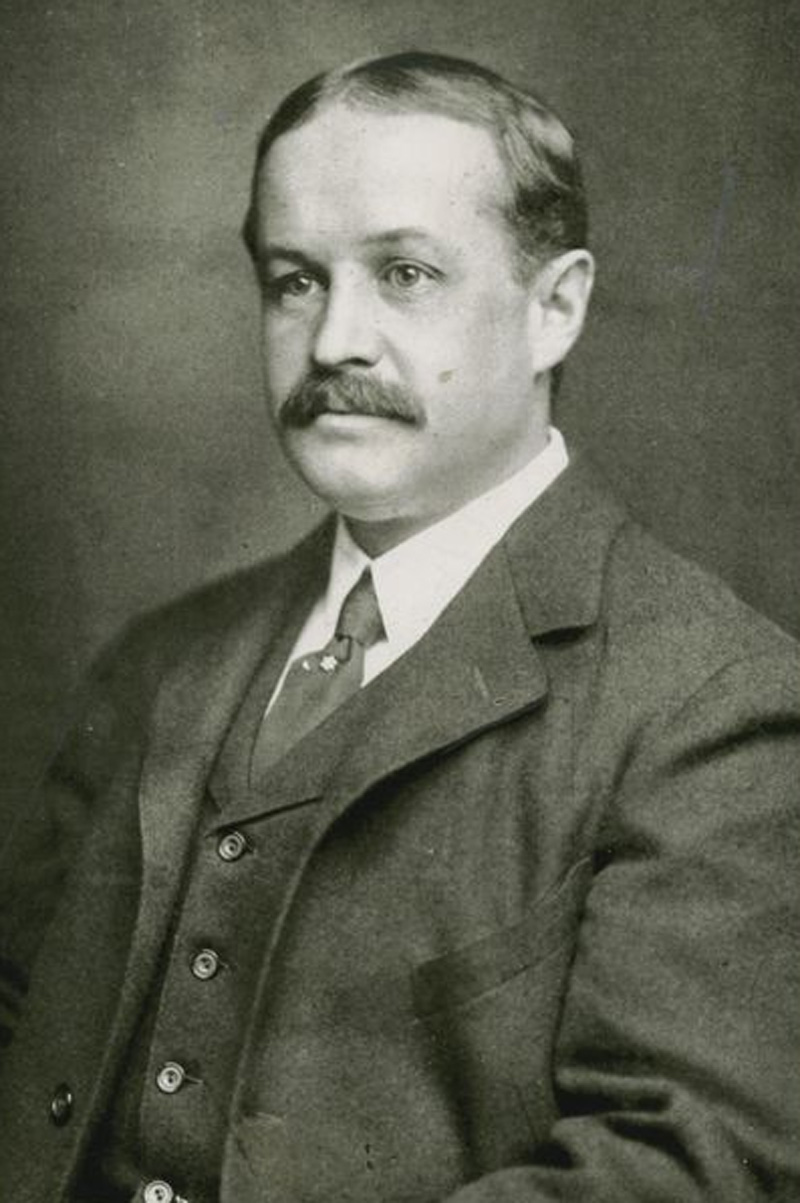
John Borland Thayer, Marian's husband, who died in the sinking of RMS Titanic.

The family and their maid boarded Titanic at Cherbourg and occupied adjoining cabins C68 and C70. On the Sunday afternoon before the ship sank, Marian and her friend Emily Ryerson went for a stroll on the deck and encountered White Star official, Bruce Ismay. According to Ryerson, Ismay showed them a telegram which said there were icebergs in the area. She also claimed in a deposition to the U.S. Senate Inquiry about Titanic that Ismay said they were going to start extra boilers on the ship.

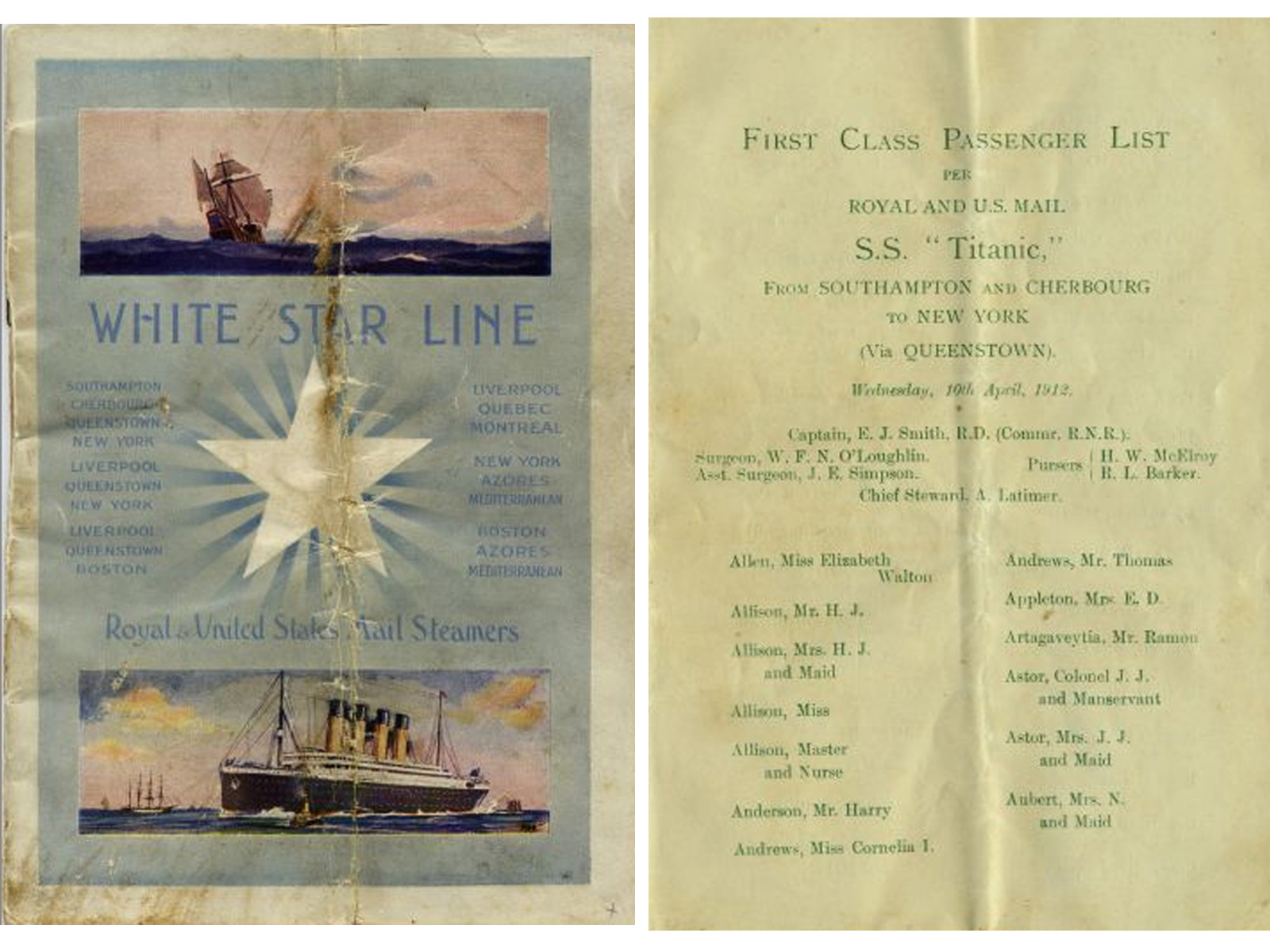
The Titanic brochure Marian inadvertently carried with her in her overcoat pocket, when she escaped from Titanic.

After Titanic struck the iceberg, Marian and her maid Margaret Fleming were taken to Lifeboat 4, where they joined other women such as Madeleine Astor, Lucile Carter, and Emily Ryerson. After the lifeboat had rowed away from Titanic, Marian gave her own account of what happened as follows:

"The after part of the ship then reared in the air, with the stern upwards, until it assumed an almost vertical position. It seemed to remain stationary in this position for many seconds (perhaps twenty), then suddenly dove straight down out of sight. It was 2.20 a.m. when the Titanic disappeared, according to a wrist watch worn by one of the passengers in my boat.

"We pulled back to where the vessel had sunk and on our way picked up six men who were swimming – two of whom were drunk and gave us much trouble all the time. The six men we picked up were hauled into the boat by the women. Two of these men died in the boat. The boat we were in started to take in water; I do not know how. We had to bail. I was standing in ice cold water up to the top of my boots all the time, and rowing continuously for nearly five hours. We took off about fifteen more people who were standing on a capsized boat. In all, our boat had by that time sixty-five or sixty-six people. There was no room to sit down in our boat, so we all stood, except some sitting along the side.

"The boat I was in was picked up by the Carpathia at 7 a.m. on Monday, we having rowed three miles to her, as we could not wait for her to come up on account of our boat taking in so much water that we would not have stayed afloat much longer."

Marian, her maid, and her son Jack Thayer survived the sinking of Titanic, but her husband John Borland Thayer went down with the ship. When Carpathia docked, Marian's brother was there to meet them and took them back to their home in Haverford, in a special train that had been arranged for survivors. Unknowingly Marian still had in the pocket of her overcoat the White Star brochure about Titanic which contained information about the ship and included a list of first class passengers. The cover of the brochure and the first page of the passenger list are shown on the right. It still bears the mark of being folded.

== After the Titanic disaster ==
Unlike many of the widows of the Titanic disaster, Marian did not remarry but remained in her house, Redwood, in Haverford. Soon after the tragedy, Marian joined Madeleine Astor in a luncheon to thank Arthur Rostron, captain of Carpathia, and Dr. Frank McGee, the ship's surgeon, for their assistance in their rescue. After this, Marian invited the two men to stay a few days at her home in Haverford where she, her son Jack, and other passengers from Titanic expressed their gratitude for their help.

Marian died at her house (Redwood) on April 14, 1944, the 32nd anniversary of the Titanic's sinking.

== See also ==
- Passengers of the RMS Titanic
