= Liam Tuohy (actor) =

Irish stage, television and film actor

Liam Tuohy (born in Dublin, Ireland) is an Irish stage, television and film actor best known for his role as Chief Baker Charles Joughin in James Cameron's 1997 blockbuster film Titanic. In addition to acting, Tuohy is a renowned Radio and Club Disc-Jockey, DJ Lee, in his native Ireland. He is also an accomplished journalist, having written his semi-autobiographical screenplay A Jack to a King, along with several others works.

== Credits ==
=== Film ===
- Titanic (1997) – Chief Baker Charles Joughin
- The Souler Opposite (1998) – Yoga Pupil
- It Could Happen (2002) – Mickser
- Red Eye (2005) – Airline Passenger (uncredited)
- Never Judge a Book (2005) – Senior Policeman
- The Still Life (2006) – Bar Patron
- Chase 'n Madi (2006) – George Morrison
- The Old Son (2007) – Tom
- Manband! The Movie (2007) – Barfly
- For Christ's Sake (2010) – Bishop Duffin

=== Television ===
- The Weird Al Show (1997) – Swimmer (uncredited)
- Platinum London Boots (Japanese television)

=== Stage ===
- Other People's Money
- Picasso at the Lapin Agile
- A staging of Ulysses
