= Charles Joughin =

British-American Titanic survivor (1878–1956)

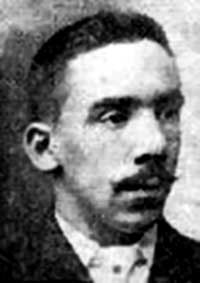
- Joughin in 1912
- Born: Charles John Joughin; 3 August 1878; Birkenhead, Cheshire, England
- Died: 9 December 1956 (aged 78); Paterson, New Jersey, U.S.
- Occupation: Merchant chef
- Known for: Chief baker of RMS Titanic
- Spouses: Louise Woodward (m. 1906; died 1919); Anna Ripley Coll (m. 1925; died 1943)
- Children: 3

Charles John Joughin (/ˈdʒɒkɪn/ JOCK-in; 3 August 1878 – 9 December 1956) was a British-American chef, known as being the chief baker aboard the RMS Titanic. He survived the ship's sinking, and became notable for his claim of having survived in the frigid water for over two hours before being pulled onto the overturned Collapsible Boat B with virtually no ill effects due to his consumption of alcohol before the ship went down.

== Early life ==
Charles Joughin was born in Patten Street, next to the West Float in Birkenhead, England, on 3 August 1878 to John Edwin, a licensed victualler, and Ellen (Crombleholme) Joughin. He was descended from a Manx family through his paternal side.

He first went to sea in 1889 aged 11, and later became chief baker on various White Star Line steamships, notably the RMS Olympic, Titanic's sister ship.

On 17 November 1906, in Liverpool, he married Louise Woodward (born 11 July 1879), a native of Douglas, Isle of Man. They had a daughter, Agnes Lillian, in 1907, and a son, Roland Ernest, in 1909. Louise is believed to have died from complications in childbirth around 1919, and her new son, Richard, was also lost.

== On the Titanic ==
Joughin was part of the victualling crew of the RMS Titanic during its maiden and final voyage in April 1912. He was aboard the ship during its delivery trip from Belfast to Southampton. He signed on again in Southampton on 4 April 1912. In the capacity of Chief Baker, Joughin received monthly wages of £12, which is equivalent to £1480 today when adjusted for inflation, and had a staff of thirteen bakers under him.

When the ship hit an iceberg on the evening of 14 April, at 23:40, Joughin was off-duty and in his bunk. According to his testimony, he felt the shock of the collision and immediately got up. Word was being passed down from the upper decks that officers were getting the lifeboats ready for launching, and Joughin sent his thirteen men up to the boat deck with provisions to the lifeboats: four loaves of bread apiece, about forty pounds (18 kg) of bread each. Joughin stayed behind for a time, but then followed them, reaching the Boat Deck at around 00:30.

Joughin joined Chief Officer Henry Tingle Wilde by Lifeboat 10. Joughin helped nearby women and children into the lifeboat, though many declined, believing they were safer aboard the Titanic. Joughin then went to A Deck and forcibly brought up women and children, throwing them into the lifeboat.

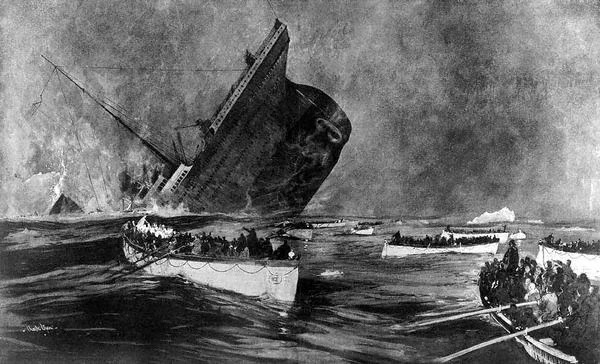
The Titanic's final plunge. Joughin was at the topmost part of the ship by this point.

Although he was assigned as captain of Lifeboat 10, Joughin did not board; it was already being crewed by two sailors and a steward. He went below after Lifeboat 10 had gone, and "had a drop of liqueur" (a tumbler half-full of liqueur, as he went on to specify) in his quarters. He then came upstairs again after meeting "the old doctor" (possibly William O'Loughlin, quite possibly the last time anyone ever saw him). When he arrived at the Boat Deck, all the boats had been lowered, so he went down into the A Deck promenade and threw about fifty deck chairs overboard so that they could be used as flotation devices.

Joughin then went into the deck pantry on A Deck to get a drink of water and, whilst there, he heard a loud crash, "as if part of the ship had buckled". He left the pantry, and joined the crowd running aft toward the poop deck. As he was crossing the well deck, the ship suddenly gave a list over to port and, according to him, threw everyone in the well in a bunch except for him. Joughin climbed to the starboard side of the poop deck, getting hold of the safety rail so that he was on the outside of the ship as it went down by the head. As the ship finally sank, Joughin rode it down as if it were an elevator, not getting his head under the water (in his words, his head "may have been wetted, but no more"). He was, therefore, the last survivor to leave the Titanic.

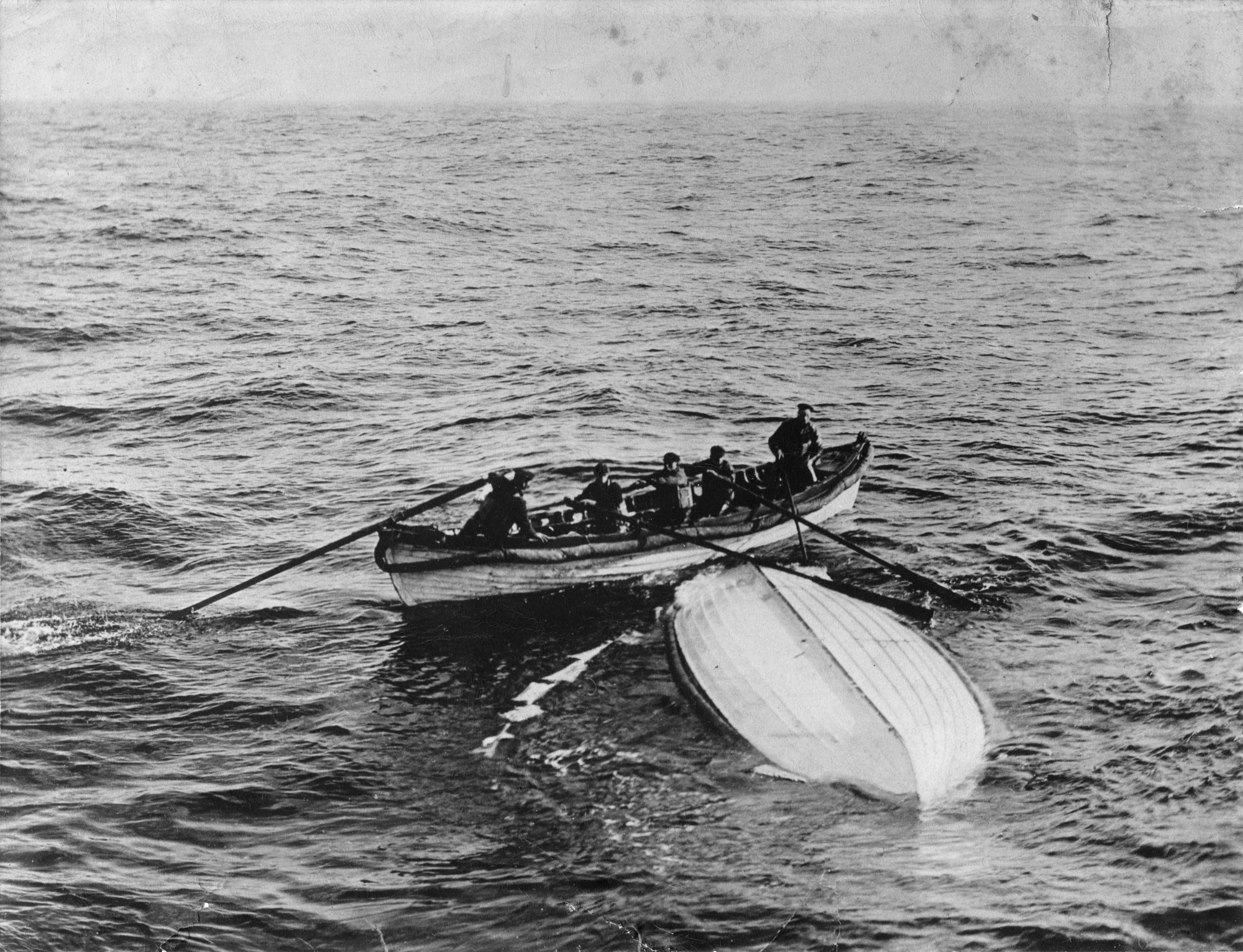
The Collapsible Boat B is found by the CS Mackay-Bennett.

At the inquiries, Joughin claimed he trod the cold waters for about two hours. He also admitted to hardly feeling the cold, attributing it to the alcohol he had consumed. When daylight broke, he spotted the upturned Collapsible Boat B, with Second Officer Charles Lightoller and around 20 men standing on the side of the boat. (Note: A lot of Joughin's accounts about being in the water are seen by Titanic historians as highly unlikely to have happened in the manner he described. Alcohol increases the rate of hypothermia occurring and it is unlikely that anyone could have survived the freezing waters for longer than half an hour; though Joughin, like many others who testified, may have felt it was a long time.) Joughin slowly swam towards it, but there was no room for him. A man, however, cook Isaac Maynard, recognized him and held his hand as the Chief Baker held onto the side of the boat, with his feet and legs still in the water. Another lifeboat then appeared and Joughin swam to it and was taken in, where he stayed until he boarded the RMS Carpathia that had come to their rescue. He was rescued from the sea with swollen feet.

== Later life ==
After surviving the Titanic disaster, Joughin returned to England, and was one of the crew members who reported to testify at the British Wreck Commissioner's inquiry into the sinking headed by Lord Mersey. In 1920, Joughin moved permanently to the United States to Paterson, New Jersey. He also served on ships operated by American Export Lines, as well as on World War II troop transports before retiring in 1944.

After moving back to New Jersey, he married Mrs. Annie Eleanor (Ripley) Howarth Coll (born 29 December 1870), a native of Leeds, who had first emigrated to the United States in 1888. Annie was a widow twice over and had a daughter, Rose (born 1891), who later married Henry Stoehr.

Annie's death in 1943 was a great loss from which he never recovered. Twelve years later, Joughin was invited to describe his experiences in a chapter of Walter Lord's book, A Night to Remember.

Soon afterwards, his health rapidly declined. He died in a Paterson hospital on 9 December 1956 at the age of 78, after two weeks with pneumonia, and was buried alongside his wife in the Cedar Lawn Cemetery, in Paterson, New Jersey.

== In popular culture ==
On film, Joughin was portrayed by George Rose in the 1958 film A Night to Remember, and by Liam Tuohy in the 1997 film Titanic.

On television, Joughin was portrayed by Chris Parnell in the fourth-season premiere of Drunk History in 2016, and by Stuart Lutes in the second season of the British version in the same year.
