= John B. Thayer =

American businessman (1862–1912)

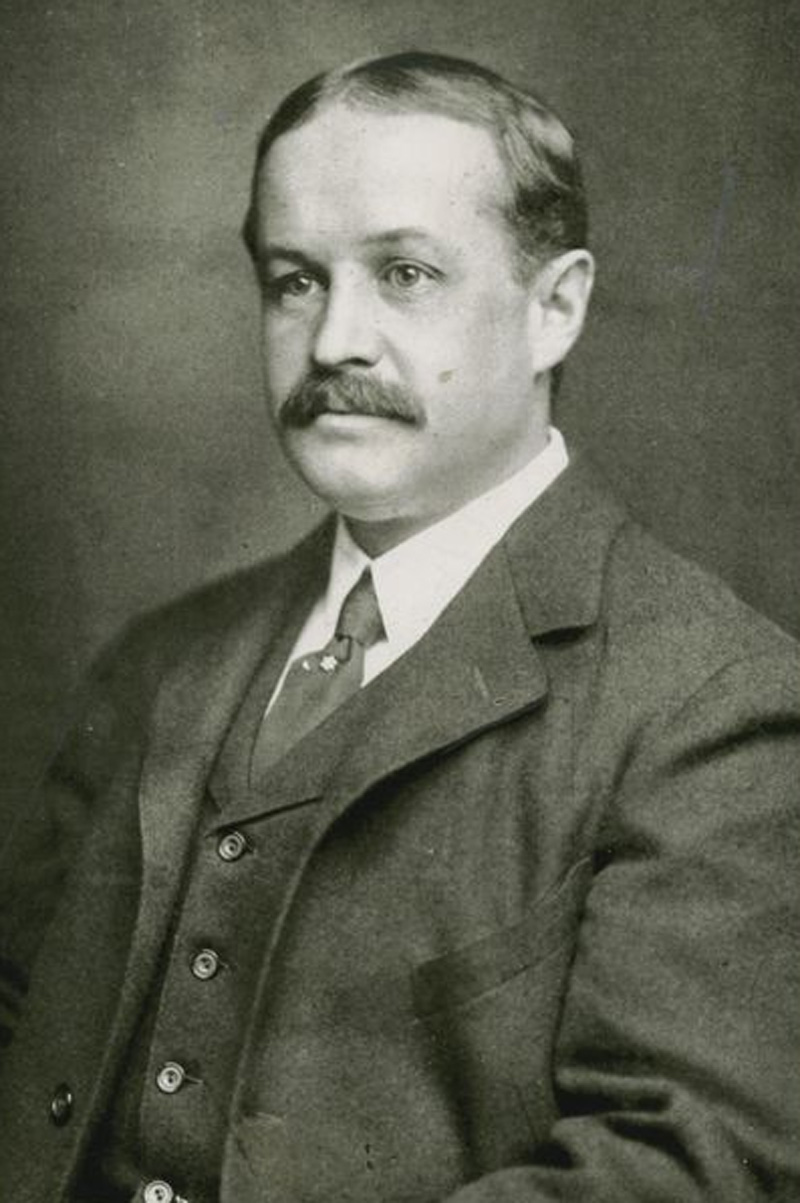
- Born: John Borland Thayer II; April 21, 1862; Philadelphia, Pennsylvania, U.S.
- Died: April 15, 1912 (aged 49); North Atlantic Ocean
- Occupation: Railway businessman
- Known for: Died on Titanic
- Spouse: Marian Thayer
- Children: 4, including Jack Thayer
- Cricket career

Cricket information

Domestic team information
- Years: Team
- 1879–1886: Philadelphia

Career statistics
| Competition | First-class |
|---|---|
| Matches | 7 |
| Runs scored | 138 |
| Batting average | 11.50 |
| 100s/50s | 0/0 |
| Top score | 24 |
| Balls bowled | 320 |
| Wickets | 6 |
| Bowling average | 26.83 |
| 5 wickets in innings | 0 |
| 10 wickets in match | 0 |
| Best bowling | 3/17 |
| Catches/stumpings | 8/– |
- Source: CricketArchive, September 10, 2008

John Borland Thayer II (April 21, 1862 – April 15, 1912) was an American businessman who had a thirty-year career as an executive with the Pennsylvania Railroad Company. He was a director and second vice-president of the company when he died at age 49 in the sinking of the RMS Titanic, on April 15, 1912. In his youth, Thayer was also a prominent sportsman, playing baseball and lacrosse for the University of Pennsylvania and first-class cricket for the Philadelphian cricket team.

== Early life and cricket career ==
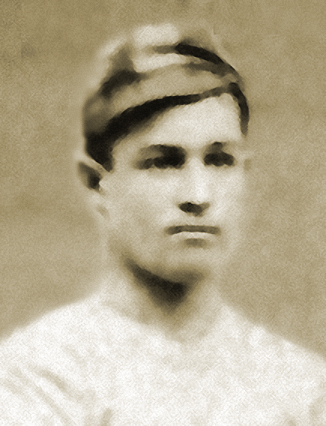
Thayer as a UPenn baseball player (1879)

Thayer was born in Philadelphia and attended the University of Pennsylvania, where he was captain of the baseball team in 1879. A member of a prominent American cricketing family, he played his first match for the Merion Cricket Club as a 14-year-old and continued playing for them until his death. Thayer was a part of the Philadelphian side that visited the United Kingdom of Great Britain and Ireland in 1884. During that tour, he scored only 817 runs, with an average of 28, and took 22 wickets for 21 runs each. In his career, Thayer appeared in seven matches now recognised as first-class matches. Three of these were played for the Philadelphians, and four were played for an "American-born" side. All were played at the Germantown Cricket Club in Pennsylvania. In his first-class career, he scored 138 runs at 11.50 and took six wickets at 26.83. His highest score (24) and best bowling (3 for 17) both came for Philadelphia against the United States in October 1883. In minor cricket, his highest scores were 134 not out v Philadelphia in 1896 and 107 not out against Winnipeg in 1882, both for Merion CC.

== Family ==
On November 9, 1892, in Philadelphia, he married Marian Longstreth Morris (1872–1944), the daughter of Frederick Wistar Morris and Elizabeth Flower Paul. Both her parents were descendants of old-moneyed Philadelphia families. They had four children:

- John "Jack" Borland Thayer III (1894–1945)
- Frederick Morris Thayer (1896–1956)
- Margaret Thayer (1898–1960) (Mrs. Harold Elstner Talbott Jr.)
- Pauline Thayer (1901–1981) (Mrs. Henry Hoffman Dolan)

Thayer's wife, Marian, boarded one of the lifeboats as a First Class passenger and survived the Titanic's sinking. Of the four children, only Jack accompanied his parents on the ill-fated vessel. A 17-year-old at the time, he survived by jumping into the freezing water and swimming to an overturned lifeboat just as the ship went under.

== Pennsylvania Railroad career ==
After leaving the University of Pennsylvania in 1881, Thayer entered the service of the Pennsylvania Railroad as a clerk in the Empire Line office, remaining in that position for about eighteen months, when he was transferred to the general freight department. After holding various positions in 1888 he was appointed freight solicitor of the United Railroads of New Jersey division.

From February 1889, to May 1892, Thayer was out of railway work before returning to the PRR in May 1892, as division freight agent of the Northern Central, with headquarters at Baltimore, MD. On December 1, 1894, he was promoted to assistant general freight agent, with office at Philadelphia, Pa., and in March 1897, was made general freight agent in charge of through traffic. In May 1899, he was appointed general freight agent also of the Northern Central, the Philadelphia, Wilmington & Baltimore, and the West Jersey & Seashore. Thayer was elected fifth vice-president of the Pennsylvania Railroad June 1, 1903, becoming manager of traffic on that road.

In October 1905, Thayer was promoted to fourth vice-president; in March 1909, third vice-president; and, in March 1911, second-vice president, his ultimate rank at the company. At the time of his death Mr. Thayer was a senior director of the Pennsylvania Railroad, managing the railroad's busiest operations east of Pittsburgh, including those of the Long Island and the New York Connecting roads. Thayer was also director and president of the Erie & Western Transport Union Company as well as a director on the Norfolk & Western and the Leigh & Hudson River roads. He was a member of a large number of prestigious clubs and organizations, including the Philadelphia Club, the Union League and the Union Club of New York, the Metropolitan Club of Washington. D. C, the Railroad Club of New York, and the Chamber of Commerce of the State of New York.

A minute adopted by the Board of Directors of the Pennsylvania Railroad after his death said in part:

In recording the terrible fate of a valued officer, and beloved and respected associate, we desire to pay fitting tribute to his memory and bear testimony to his great worth to the company, not only as an officer, but in its highest councils. Mr. Thayer was thoroughly equipped for the high office which he held, by his long service in the traffic department of the company, having discharged the duties of various official positions with the same diligence, intelligence and skill which were manifested and more highly developed in his executive life, until, through the channels of work well done and achievements of lasting importance, his name finds place on the roll of honor of those who have served the company faithfully and well: while to those who labored side by side with him his memory, though darkened by the tragic ending of his life at the high tide of his usefulness, is made more dear by the characteristic manhood and heroism with which he accepted his fate- His true value to the company did not consist alone in his ability as an executive officer and prominent standing as a traffic authority; his alert mind and power of ready expression made for much in argument, debate and negotiation, and never were the interests of the company safer than in his hands. A man in all that endears men to men, of genial nature, with an affable manner and a ready appreciation of humor, he was a charming companion and beloved by all who knew him, while the example of his integrity, honorable dealing and clean life is an inspiration alike to friends, associates and subordinates.

— Railway Age Gazette, April 26, 1912

== The Titanic ==
In the spring of 1912 Thayer and his family had been in Europe as guests of the American Consul General in Berlin, Germany. On April 10 the family boarded the RMS Titanic at Cherbourg-en-Cotentin as first-class passengers and had been preparing for bed on the evening of April 14 when the collision with the iceberg occurred. As the ship sank, Thayer made sure his wife and maid boarded lifeboats, after being told by the Titanic's designer, Thomas Andrews, that the stricken ship did not have "much over an hour to live". His son Jack dove from the sinking ship and was able to swim to an overturned collapsible boat, where he also survived. However, Thayer Sr. made it clear that he had no intention of boarding a boat, and he remained on the Titanic as it sank. When all of the lifeboats were gone, one eyewitness reportedly saw Thayer looking "pale and determined by the midship rail aft of lifeboat 7." A short while later, he had gone, so it is likely that he moved to the stern like many other passengers and crew.

Initially, the British media had reported that Thayer had survived the sinking, due to confusion between Thayer and his son. Thayer's body was never recovered. He is the only first-class cricketer known to have died aboard Titanic.

== See also ==
- Passengers of the RMS Titanic

== Sources ==
- Croudy, B. "Cricket in Philadelphia – The Great Families", The Cricket Statistician, No. 113, Spring 2001. The Association of Cricket Statisticians and Historians; West Bridgford, Nottingham.
