= Second- and third-class facilities on the Titanic =

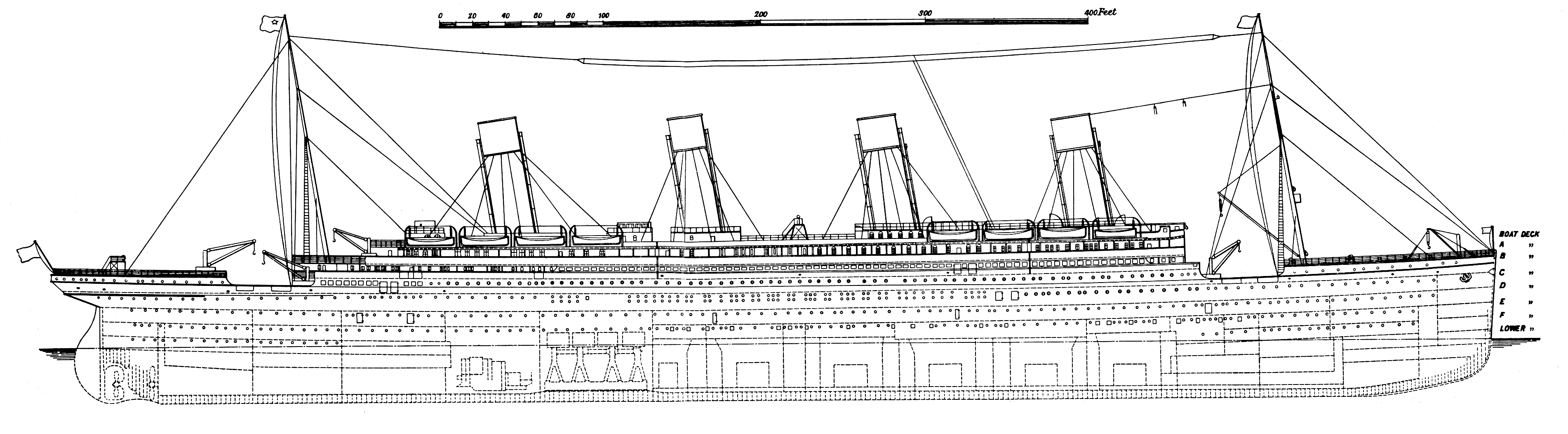
The side plan of the Titanic, with all decks portrayed in the ocean liner

Second-class accommodation and facilities on board the Titanic were quite intricate and spacious in comparison to many first-class facilities on other ships of the time. Although the Second and Third Class sections of the ship occupied a much smaller proportion of space overall than those of first class aboard the Titanic, there were several comfortable, large public rooms and elevators for the passengers to enjoy, so much in fact that the minority of the spaces provided were actually used during the voyage. 284 passengers boarded Second Class in a ship that could accommodate 410 second-class passengers.

Third-class accommodation was also comfortable by the standards of the time. A dining saloon provided the third-class passengers with simple meals three times a day, at a time when many ships forced steerage passengers to bring their own food provisions for the voyage.

== Second class ==
=== Accommodation ===
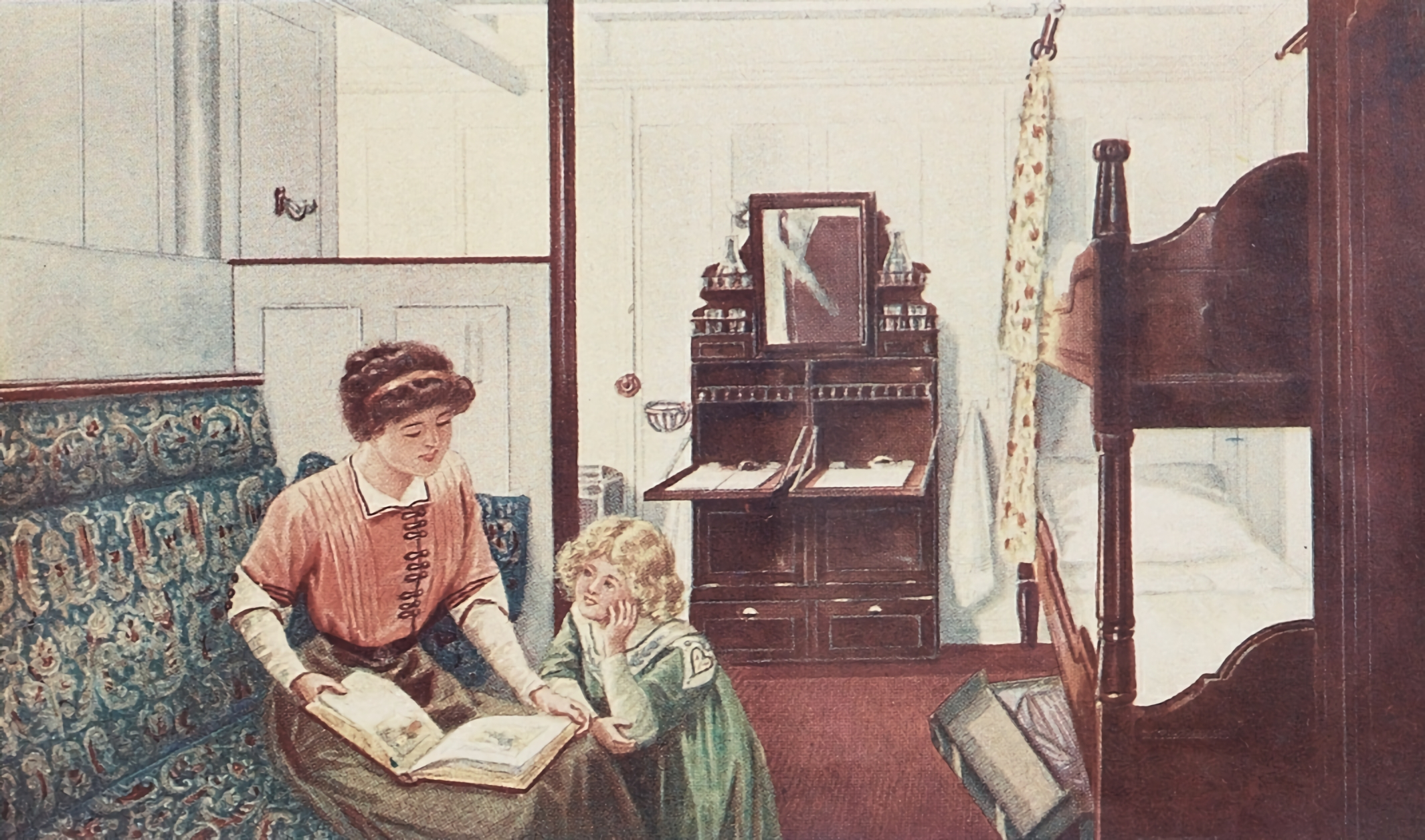
Period Illustration of a second Class stateroom aboard the Titanic

The bulk of second-class passenger staterooms were located aft of midship, between D and F Decks. Second Class on E-Deck ran along the starboard side of the ship. Only the cabins all the way aft, E89 through E107, were considered "permanent" Second Class; E43 through E88 were considered "Second Class/Alternate First Class" cabins. This meant that they were furnished and equipped for Second Class, which they would normally accommodate, but on occasions of high demand could be used for First Class. Certain upgrades like heaters and carpeted floors (instead of linoleum) were added in these cabins, but otherwise, all the furniture and conveniences were typical of Second Class. During the maiden voyage of Titanic, E43 through E68 served as First Class. Further forward along E-Deck, all but four staterooms between E1 and E42 were in turn classified as First Class "alternative" Second Class, meaning that they were furnished and intended for First Class use ordinarily but could be used for Second Class passengers.

Second-class staterooms were very comfortable, featuring oak paneling painted a glossy white, linoleum floors, and mahogany furniture usually consisting of a large sofa, wardrobe, and dressing table with washbasin, mirror, and storage shelves. Second Class washbasins were of the type known as a "Compactom" or "Clock". These were earthenware basins which could be folded back against the wall to drain them and save space when not in use. Second Class cabins were not connected to the ship's freshwater tanks; instead, they had to be supplied with hot and cold water manually by a steward. The steward would fill the holding tank concealed in the washbasin cabinets and also empty used water from a "sluice tank" which the basin drained into. Shared staterooms were segregated by sex, so that single women or men often shared staterooms. Unlike in first class, which offered many staterooms with private bathrooms, second-class bathroom facilities were all shared. Communal lavatories and bathrooms were separated by companionways and divided by sex. A bath could be had on request to a steward, and bed linen was changed daily.

=== Public areas ===
Second class offered passengers a spacious library/area, smoking room, outdoor promenade, and dining room. There was also a barber shop off the main staircase on E Deck and a purser's Office where passengers could store their valuables. There were two staircases for Second Class passengers—the main forward one communicated between the boat deck all the way down to F Deck and featured an elevator, the first to be featured in Second Class aboard an ocean liner. The second ran between F and B Decks and directly accessed the Library and Smoking Room. Both stairways were more modestly designed than their first-class counterparts; the balustrades were made entirely of oak, and the flooring was in white and red patterned linoleum.

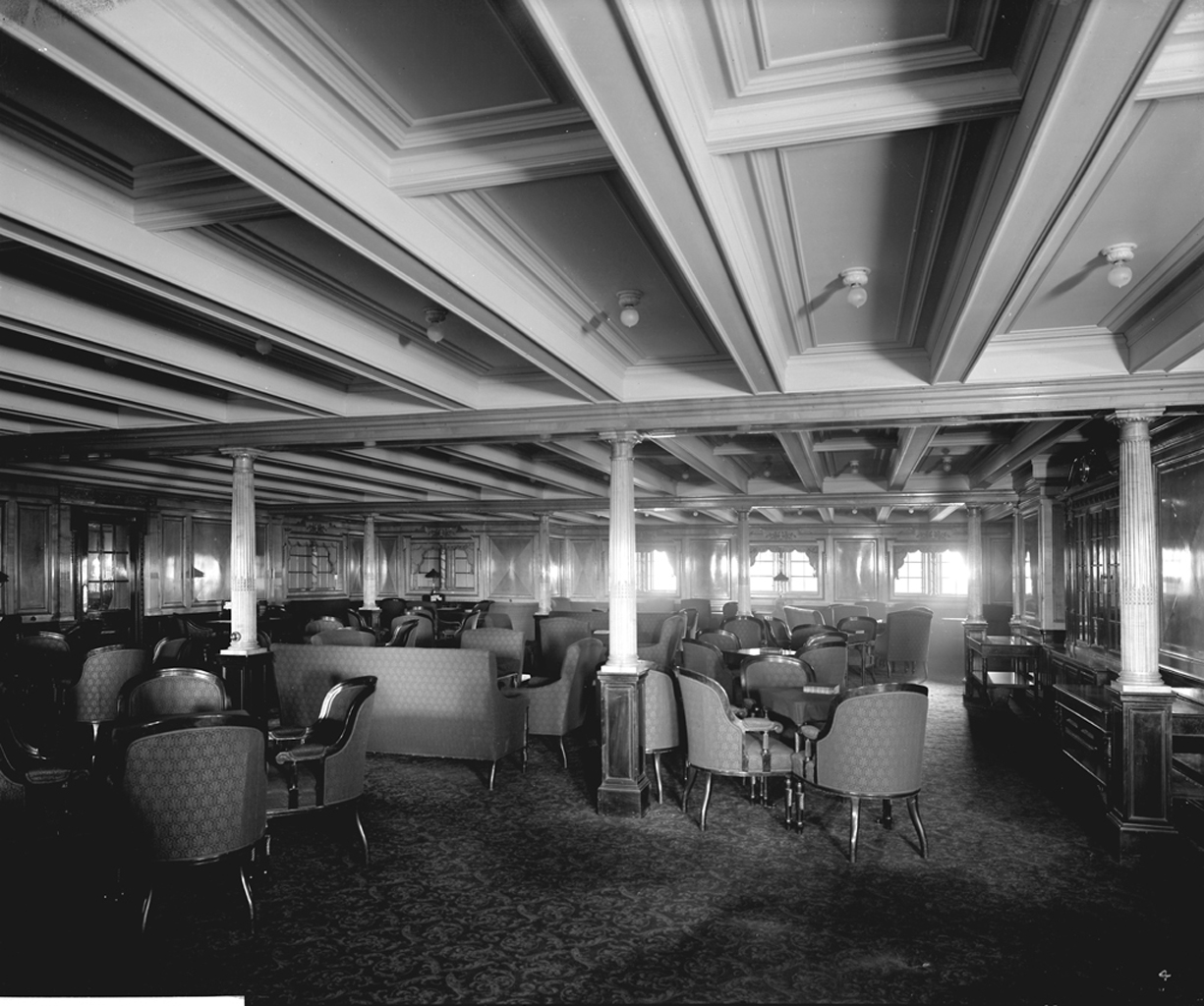
The Second-Class library on RMS Olympic.

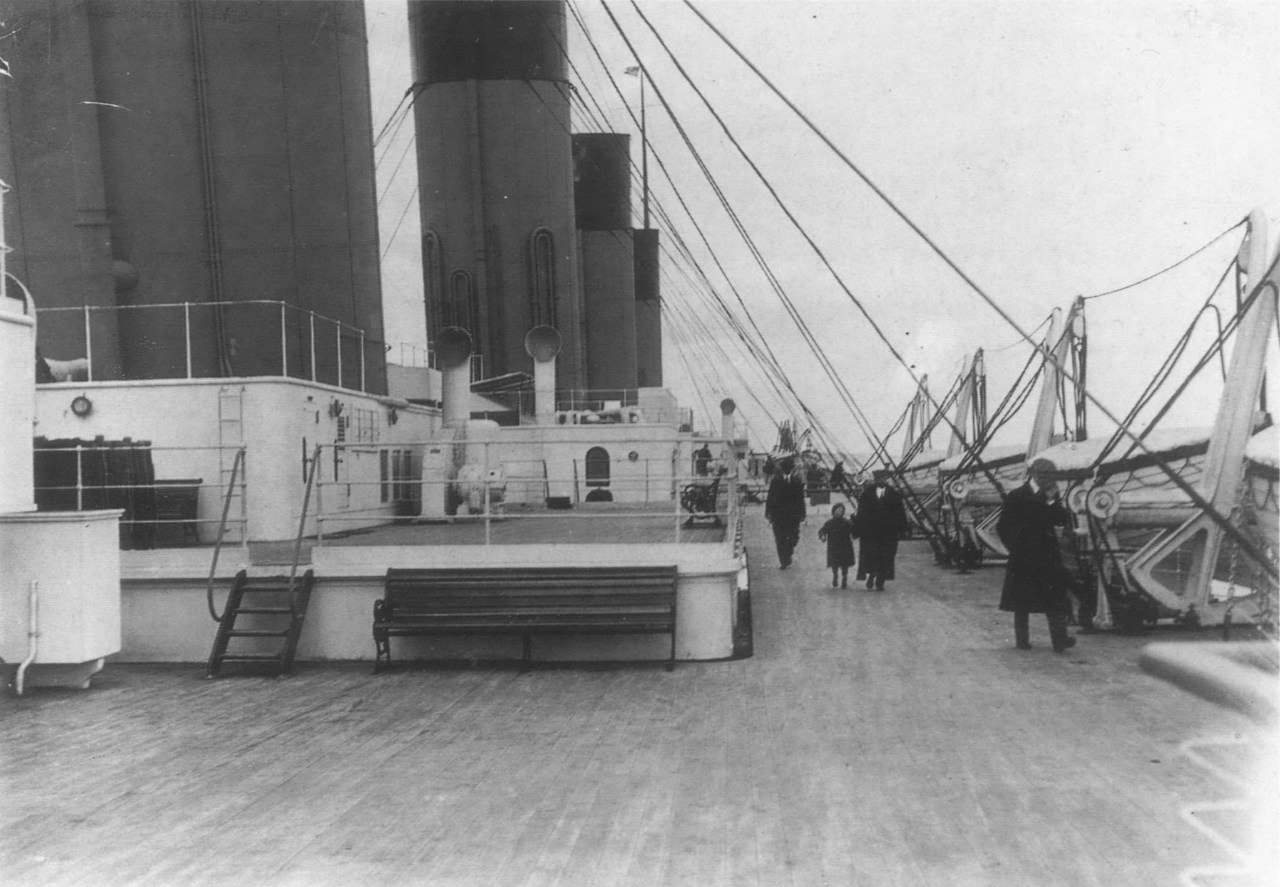
Second-Class promenade area of Titanic's boat deck

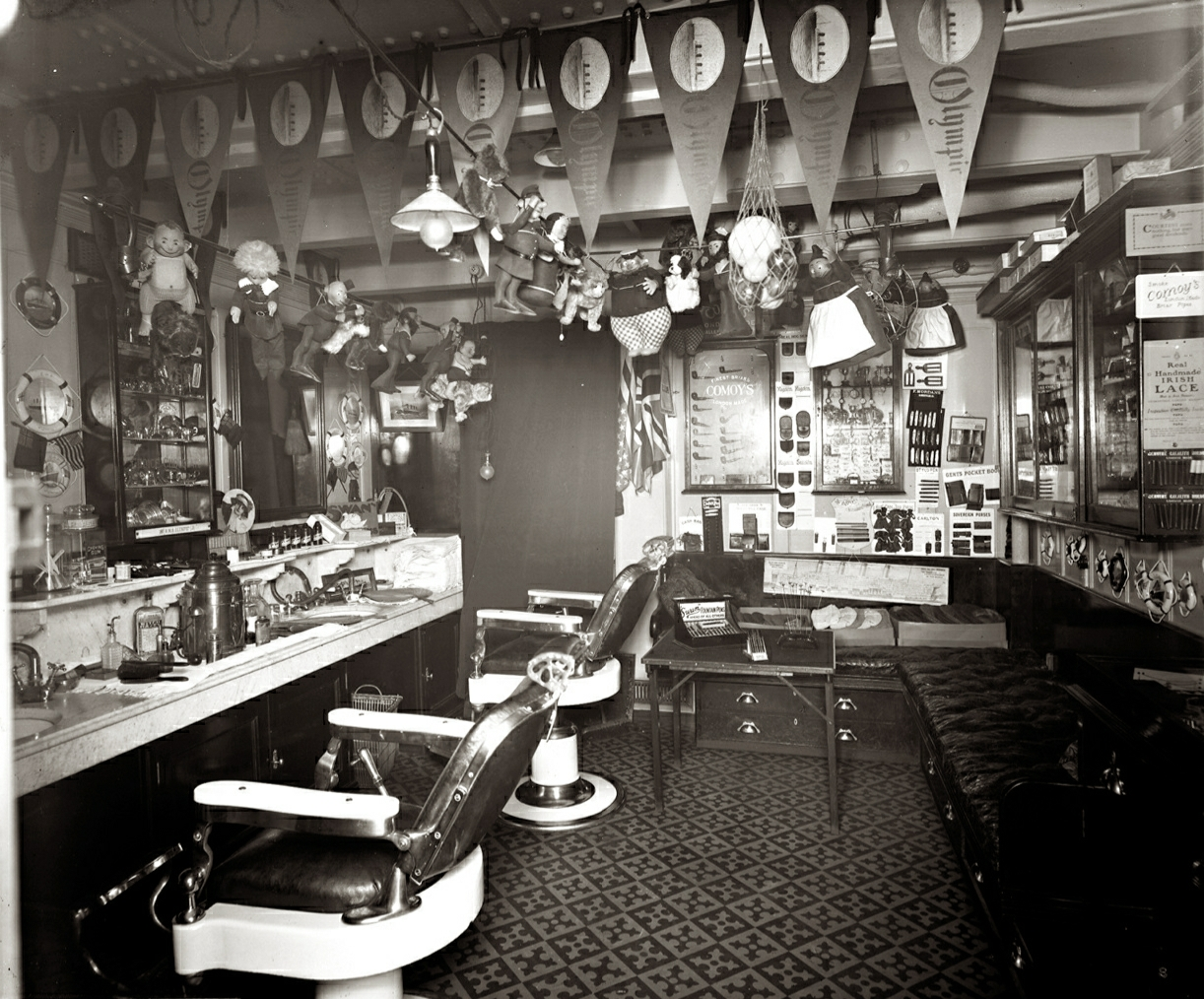
The Second-Class barber shop on board the Olympic, quite similar to the one on the Titanic.

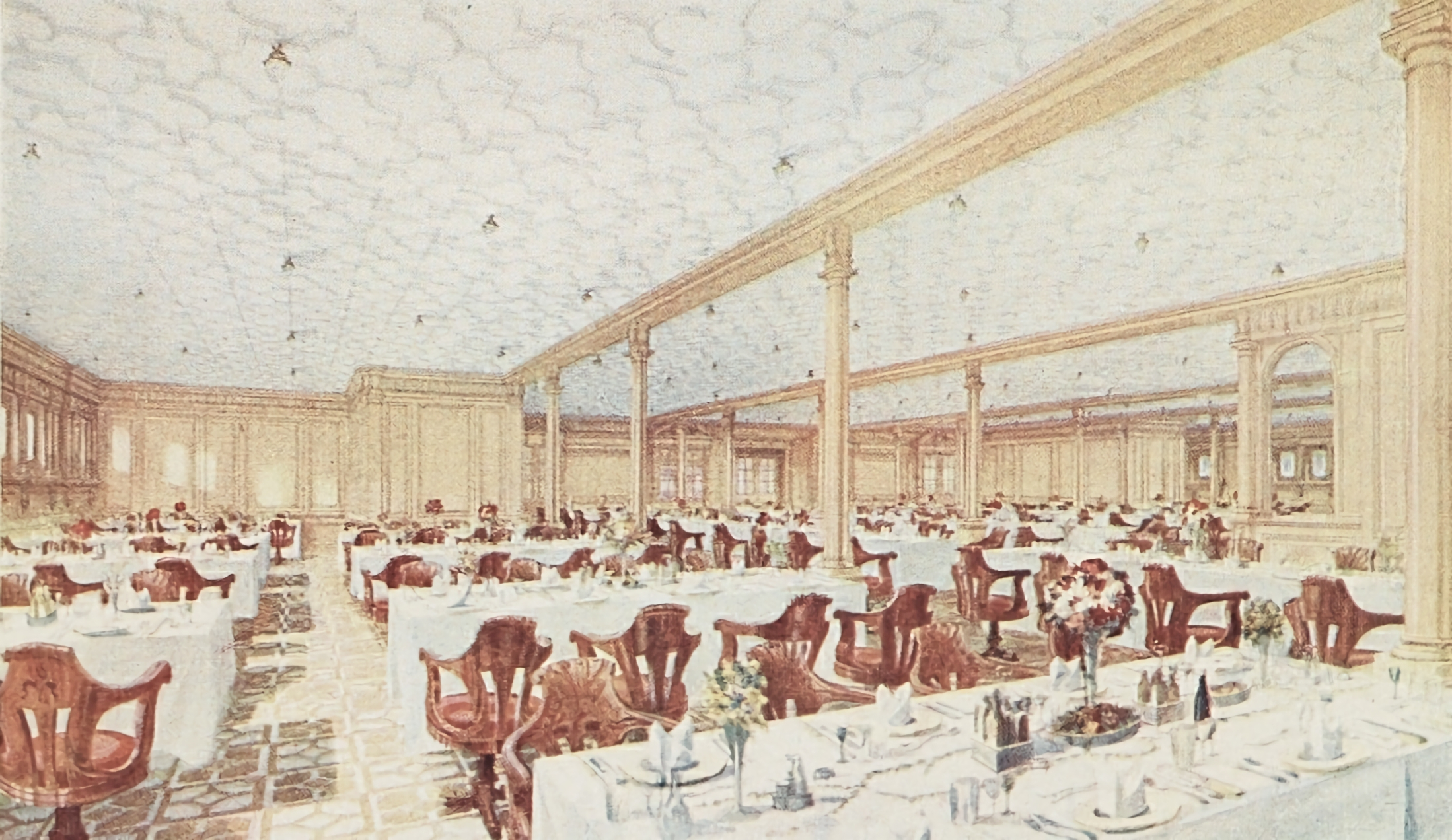
Ca. 1910 Illustration of Second-Class Dining Room on Titanic and Olympic.

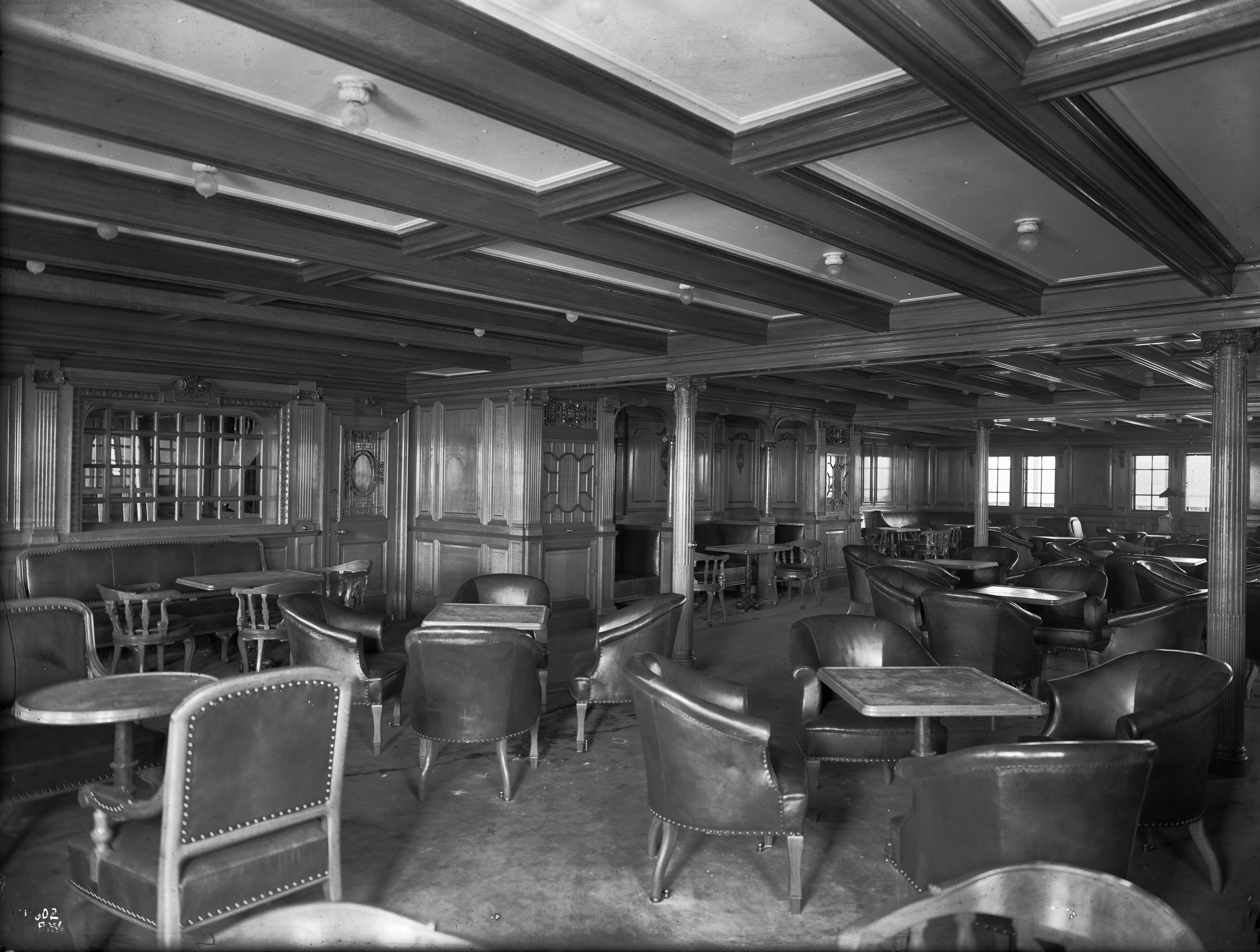
Second-Class Smoking Room

==== Promenade Decks ====
There were three separate outdoor promenade areas for the second class. The main one was a 145 ft long unsheltered stretch at the aft end of the boat deck that encompassed the raised roof of the first-class smoking room. A small deckhouse was installed, acting as the second-class entrance, from where the elevator and main staircase were reached. There were wooden-slatted wrought iron benches installed along this deck, and teak deck chairs could be rented for three shillings/1 dollar per person for the voyage.

The other two promenades were on B and C Decks, surrounding the smoking room and library. The C Deck level was 84 ft long and enclosed in steel framing with glass windows. It was generally used as a children's play area.

==== Library ====
The library was located on C Deck at the aft end of the Titanic's superstructure, overlooking the aft well deck and poop deck. Decorated in the Adam style, it was paneled in contrasting light sycamore and dark mahogany with columned accents. There were fluted, white-painted wooden columns throughout the room supporting a coffered plaster ceiling. Mahogany chairs and tables furnished the room, with writing desks by the windows, with lamps and a large bookcase which functioned as the lending library. This room combined the functions of the library, lounge, writing room, and drawing room.

==== Smoking room ====
The smoking room, like its first-class counterpart, was a male-only domain. Located directly above the Library, it was decorated in the Louis XVI style, paneled in oak and laid with linoleum tiles. Oak club chairs upholstered in green Morocco leather surrounded square tables for card playing. There was an adjoining bar for stewards to supply drinks and cigars, and an adjoining lavatory.

==== Barber Shop ====
Like first-class passengers, second-class men had a barber shop located on E Deck, accessible via the second-class staircase, where they could shave and get a haircut. The barber shop was run by Herbert Klein (who died during the sinking), and in the same way as its first-class counterpart, this room also served as a souvenir shop, where all kinds of gift items were provided for passengers, as well as postcards with a photograph of the ship.

==== Dining saloon ====
The Second-Class dining saloon was located aft on D Deck and shared the same galley as the First-Class dining saloon further forward. Although only about half the size of its first-class counterpart, it was nonetheless a large room at 70 ft long that could accommodate 394 in one sitting. Supplied with natural light by portholes, the room was paneled in oak and lined with linoleum flooring. There were parallel rows of long, rectangular dining tables in contrast to the cozy seating groups in first class, and the mahogany swivel chairs upholstered in red leather were bolted to the floor (this was a standard feature even in First Class aboard other ships). An upright Steinway & Sons piano, used for church service on Sundays, stood in an alcove against the forward wall. At its forward end, the dining saloon surrounded the Second-Class forward stairwell on three sides; it could be entered from doors on either side flanking the stairwell. At the aft end, a pair of double doors led into the dining saloon from the after Second-Class stairwell. The food served was nearly as good as that in first class, with a wide variety. Breakfast options included ox, eggs, sausage, ham, potatoes, and oats, while dinner entree options included curry chicken, lamb, and turkey.

=== Surviving artifacts ===
None of the second-class public areas of the Titanic survives in an appreciable form because they are located in the stern section, the decks of which have pancaked upon one another. The C Deck steel housing, which once contained the stairway and Library for second class, is discernible, along with the once-covered promenade area with its enclosed windows.

Sections of RMS 'Olympic's second-class public areas survived for many years at the Haltwhistle Paint Factory in Northumberland, England, before they were auctioned in 2004. These included paneling, a pilastered doorway with cornice, and moulding from the dining saloon, the window and surrounding frame from the second-class purser's office, and paneling and windows from the second-class stairway. Part of the sycamore and mahogany paneling from the library on Olympic is installed in the Silver Vestibule of the Cutler's Hall in Sheffield.

== Third class ==
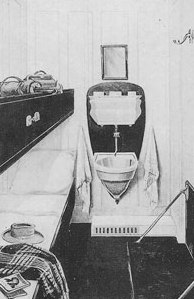
Titanic Third-Class cabin

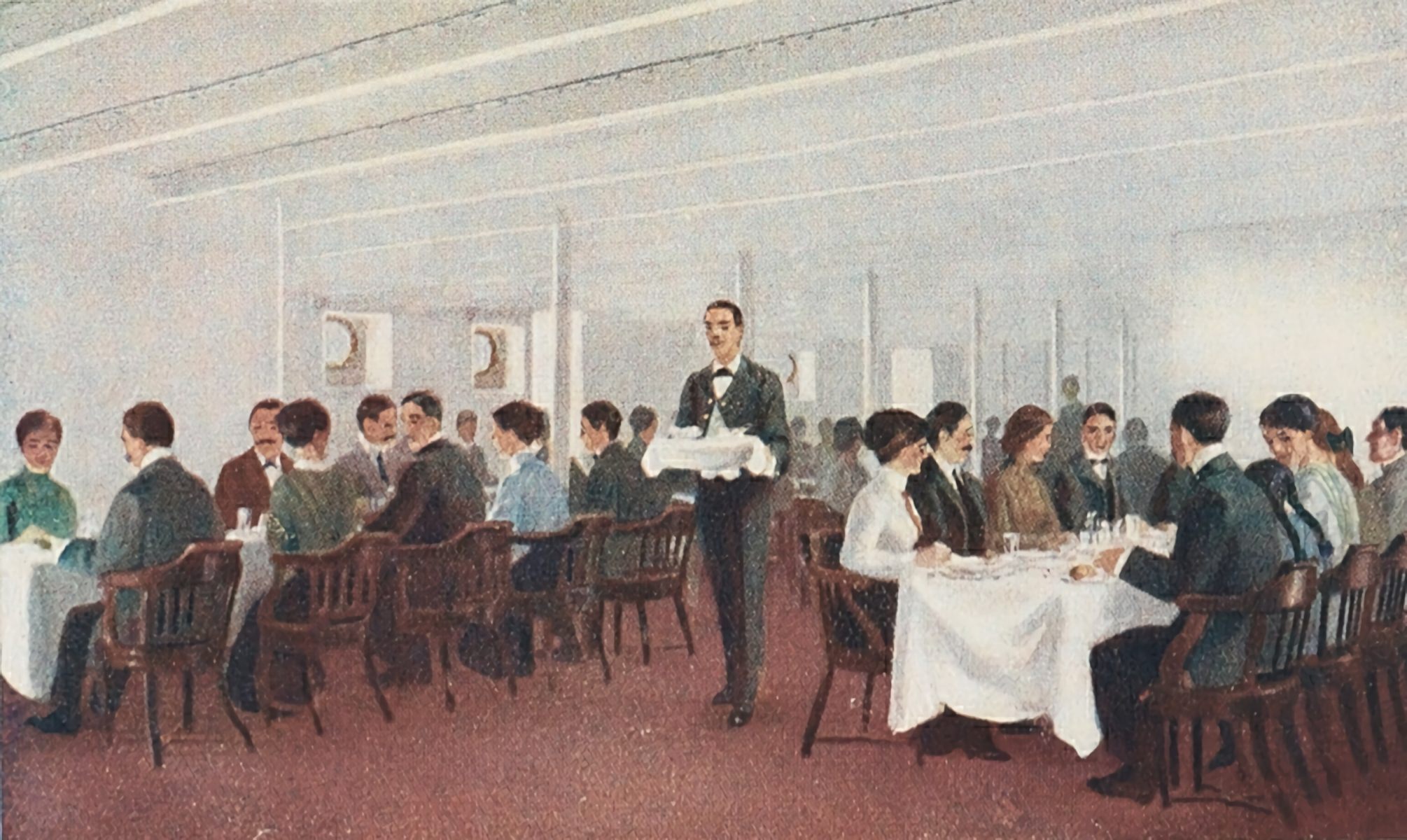
Contemporary drawing of Olympic and Titanic Third-Class Dining Room

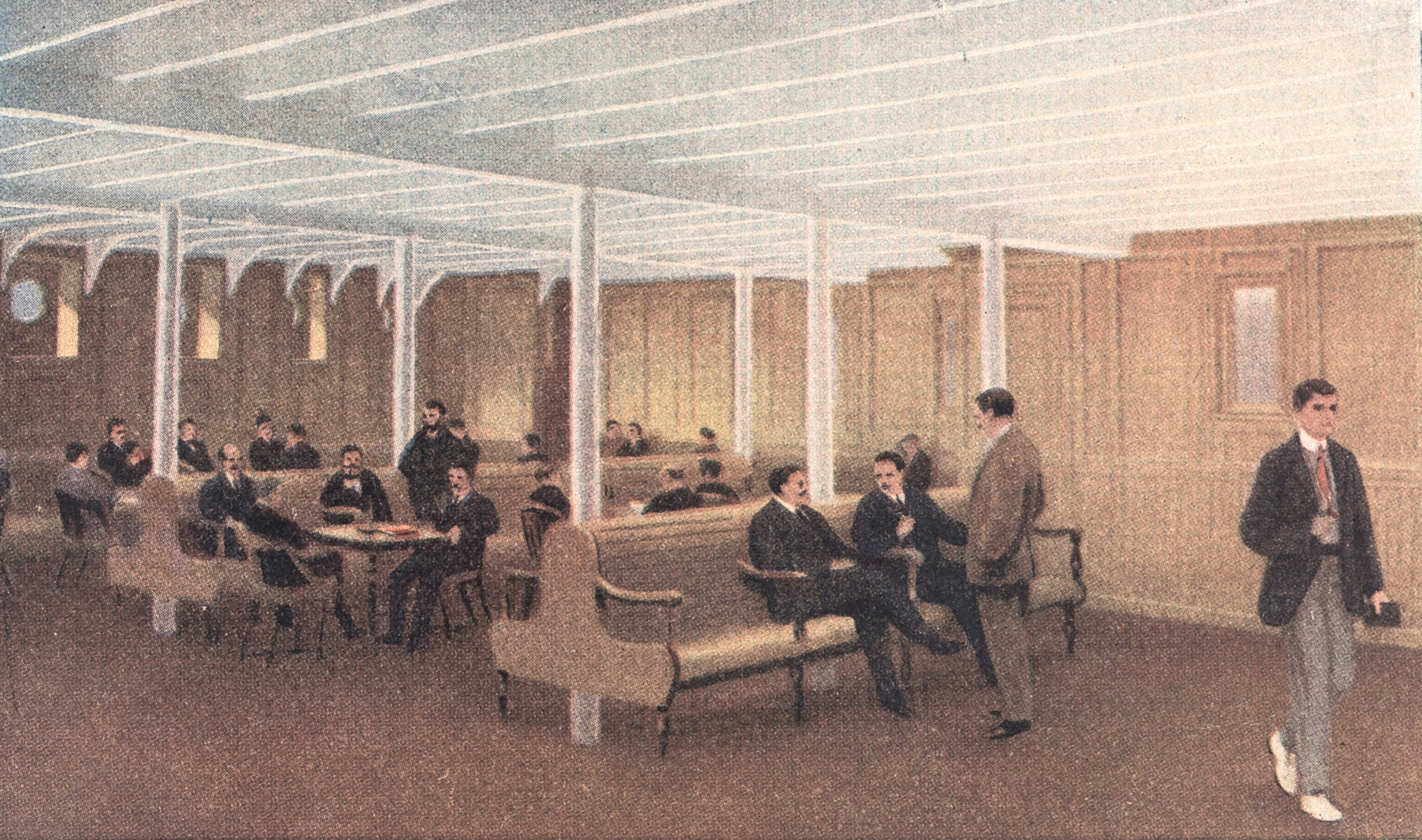
Contemporary drawing of Titanic and Olympic Third-Class Smoke Room

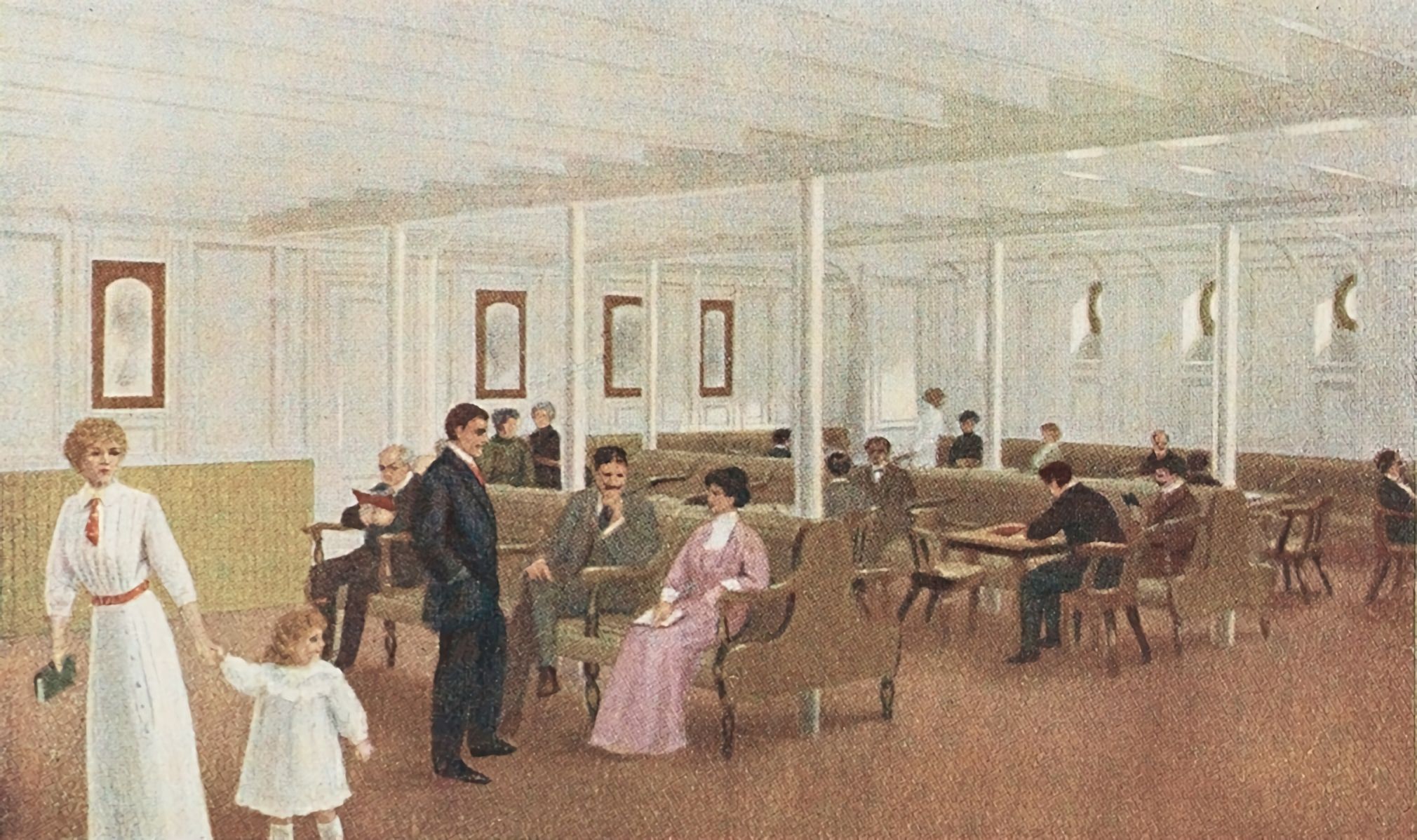
Period illustration of Olympic and Titanic Third-Class General Room

=== Accommodation ===
Third-class on board Titanic was noticeably more comfortable than what was offered on many of her competitors, though third-class passengers were granted the smallest proportion of space on board and very few facilities. The White Star Line had earned a reputation for providing notably good service in third-class, which was becoming an increasingly profitable share of the transatlantic passenger service. Technically "steerage", the term for low-paying immigrant passengers housed in open-plan dormitories, does not apply to the Titanic's third-class passengers, all of whom were housed in private cabins of no more than 10 people. There were 84 two-berth cabins for third-class, and in all, 1,100 third-class passengers could be accommodated.

Accommodation for third-class was located in the least desirable parts of the ship, where passengers were subject to the noise and vibrations of the engines. These were on the lower decks at either end of the ship. Single men were housed in the bow while single women and families were accommodated in the stern section, with families occupying the larger cabins. Cabins were spacious by the standards of the time but often irregularly shaped, to conform with the curvature of the ship's stern and bow sections. They were panelled in white-painted pine with salmon pink coloured linoleum floors, mattresses and White Star bed linens (the only exception was single men, who were provided with only straw-stuffed mattresses and a blanket). Only the cabins for families and single women were furnished with washbasins. The freshwater was stored in wall-mounted enamelled tanks which had to be manually filled by a steward. The wastewater from the basin would drain into a tank below, which the steward would drain by opening a sluice valve. In contrast to first and second class, there were only two bathtubs—one for men and one for women—to serve the more than 700 third-class passengers on board at any one time.

=== Public areas ===
There were four main rooms to serve third-class passengers, in addition to the outdoor space located on the poop and aft well decks in the stern and the forward well deck near the bow. All three rooms were simply appointed, with an emphasis on easy maintenance and hygiene.

The dining saloon was located midship on F Deck and was actually two rooms separated by a bulkhead. It was 100 ft long in total and could accommodate 473 at a time. Like other parts of third class, the saloon was segregated: the forward room was reserved for families and single women and the aft room for single men. The uptake shafts from boiler rooms 2 and 3 partially occupied spaces in both rooms, dividing them into four different sections. There were some sections paneled in pine, but otherwise, only steel painted in white enamel and hung with posters advertising other White Star ships. Nonetheless, there were comfortable, free-standing wooden chairs and the room was brightly lit by portholes. The menu wasn't as luxurious as the other two classes, but was still better than what many of the passengers would have eaten at home, including oatmeal, ham, and eggs for breakfast, and roast beef for dinner. Underneath the poop deck were two gathering spaces for third-class passengers, the general room along the starboard side, and the third-class smoking room along the port. Both were modestly appointed with pine-paneled walls painted white, linoleum floor tiling, and long wooden benches for seating. The smoking room, a male-only domain, featured its own bar, spittoons, and tables attached to the floor for card playing and other activities.

The general room was a fairly small but popular recreation space for both sexes to interact, usually under the careful watch of their chaperones. There was a piano in the room and passengers with their own instruments could form bands to accompany parties. A party was held in this room the evening of the sinking until the lights were extinguished at 10:00 pm.

The third-class open space was a very large room all the way forward in the ship on D Deck, directly underneath the forward well deck above. It could be entered from outside via two wide staircases off the well deck or from below via another set of staircases from E Deck. While it had tables and chairs installed along the port and starboard sides, as the title suggests the room was mostly open space ideal for dances and socializing. There was a bar and numerous drinking fountains throughout the room. In the middle of the space were the enclosed wells of the bunker and No. 2 cargo hatches, through which cargo was lowered down to the orlop deck before departure. It was tiled in red linoleum, with the exposed steel of the hull painted in white enamel and hung with posters advertising the White Star Line and the ships of the IMM.

== See also ==
- First-class facilities of the Titanic

== Bibliography ==
- Ballard, Robert D. (1987). The Discovery of the Titanic. New York: Warner Books. ISBN 978-0-446-51385-2.
- Beveridge, Bruce (2008). Titanic—The Ship Magnificent Volume One: Design & Construction. Stroud: The History Press. ISBN 978-0-7524-4606-6.
- Beveridge, Bruce (2009). The Ship Magnificent, Volume Two: Interior Design & Fitting. The History Press. ISBN 978-0-7524-4626-4.
- Lynch, Don (1992). Titanic: An Illustrated History. Wellfleet Press. ISBN 978-0-7858-1972-1.
- Tibballs, Geoff (1997). The Titanic: The Extraordinary Story of the Unsinkable Ship. Carlton Press Ltd. ISBN 0-89577-990-0.
- Tibballs, Geoff (2002). The Mammoth Book of the Titanic: Contemporary accounts from survivors and the world's press. Carroll & Graf Publishers. ISBN 0-7867-1005-5.
