= First-class facilities of the Titanic =

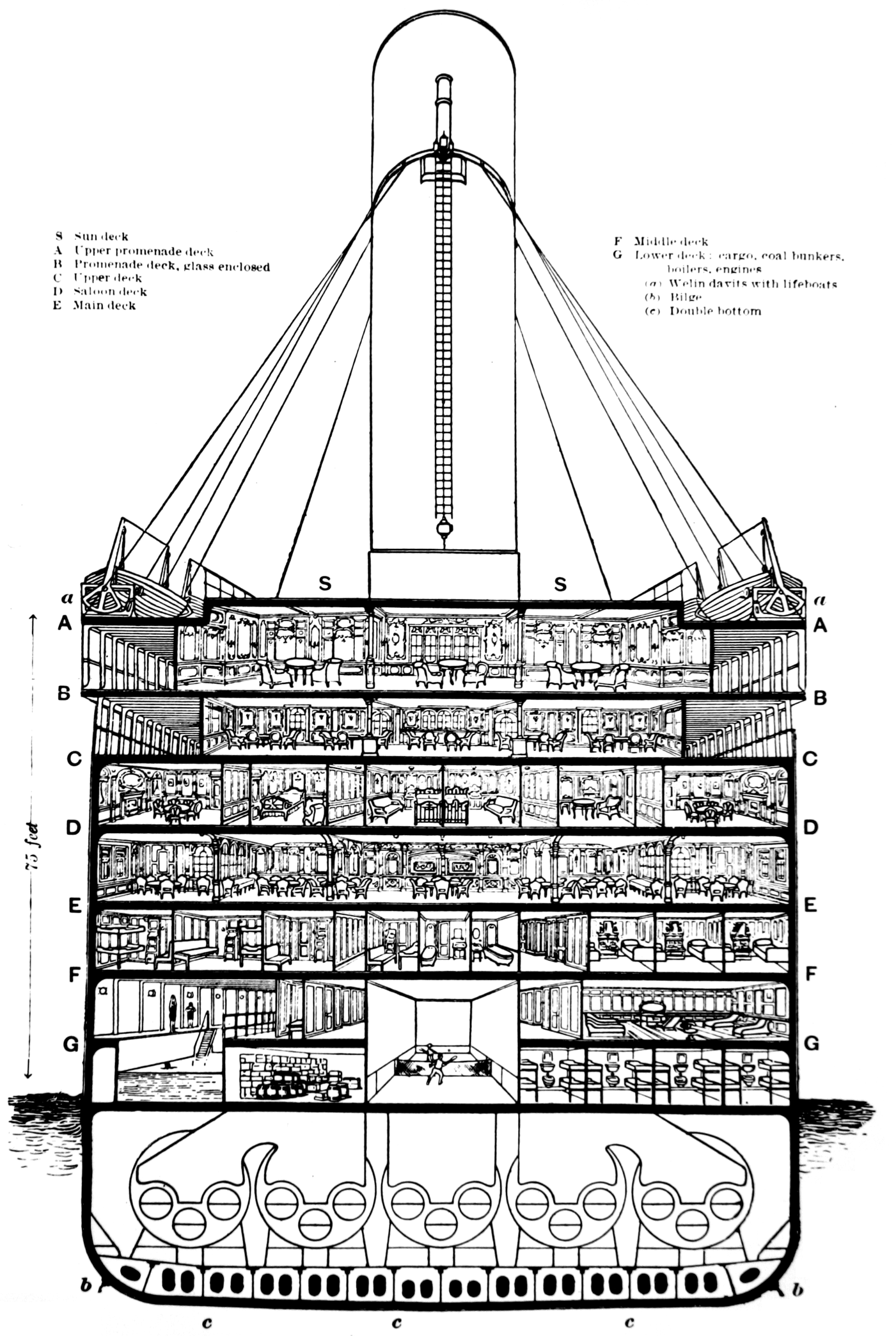
Titanic cutaway diagram

Reflecting White Star Line's reputation for superior comfort and luxury, the Titanic had extensive facilities for First Class passengers which were widely regarded as the finest of her time. In contrast to her French and German competitors, whose interiors were extravagantly decorated and heavily adorned, the Titanic emphasized comfort and subdued elegance more in the style of a British country manor or luxury hotel. Titanic's enormous size enabled her to feature unusually large rooms, all equipped with the latest technologies for comfort, hygiene, and convenience. Staterooms and public spaces recreated historic styles with a painstaking attention to detail and accuracy. There was a wide range of recreational and sporting facilities in addition which provided ample opportunity for amusement during a voyage.

Although closely similar to her sister ship and predecessor RMS Olympic, Titanic featured additional First-Class staterooms, augmented public rooms, and myriad minor improvements to enhance luxury and comfort.

== Location ==
The bulk of First-Class facilities and accommodation was located on the upper decks within the superstructure of the Titanic, where the vibrations and noise of the engines were at their lowest. The entirety of A-Deck was devoted to First-Class recreation accommodation, along with most of B and C Decks.

== Accommodation ==
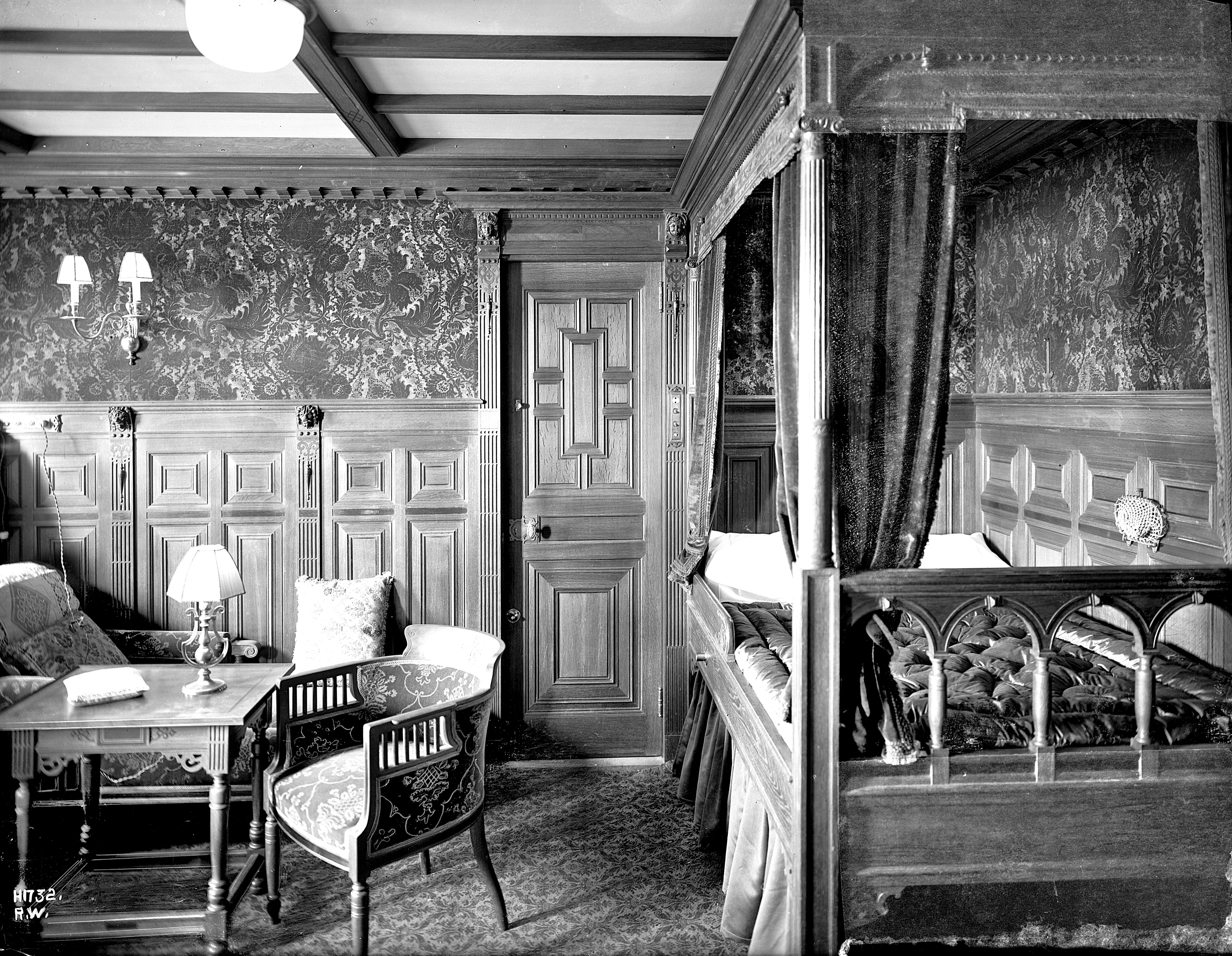
Titanic's B 59 stateroom

The Titanic and her sister the Olympic offered some of the most luxurious First-Class accommodations to be found on any ocean liner at the time. The cheapest first class fare was in a standard cabin and cost around £30 (equivalent to £3,000 in 2025). Standard suites could range in price from £100-£300, whereas the more lavish and opulent parlour suites cost £500–£1000.

=== Standard Cabins ===
The type of First-Class stateroom that predominated was a single, double or triple-berth stateroom which contained a dressing table, horsehair sofa, wardrobe, and marble-topped washstand with basin. Double berth cabins had "tipped" washbasins on shelves that could be folded back into the cabinet to save room. Many also had additional bunks suspended over the main bed that could be put next to the wall. Staterooms increased in size thereafter with double beds, built-in wardrobes, and comfortable seating areas. Single berth state rooms, like those on A-Deck, were decorated more modestly than the lavish period suites on B and C-Decks. Above most beds was an electrical outlet with a call button that could summon a steward, a reading lamp and a wire-mesh basket for storing small items. Although the Titanic was centrally heated, all first-class cabins contained electric heaters to provide additional warmth and passengers could get electric bed warmers on request to a steward.

=== Facilities ===
As was standard at the time, the bulk of First-Class bathroom facilities were shared. Communal lavatories with illuminated signage could be found along the passageways divided by gender. To use one of the communal baths, the passenger would need to make a reservation with their respective bedroom steward, who passed it along to a bath steward to execute. Because of the need to conserve limited fresh water supplies, baths were supplied with sea water; only the attached showers of the private bathrooms utilised fresh water. Bathtubs had their own folding wooden seats and were filled from below rather than from a tap above, to prevent steam and keep the noise down. The baths were sanitized by an attendant after every use. Titanic had an impressive ratio of private bathrooms to passengers, more than any other ship in 1912. Virtually all of the suites on B and C Decks featured en-suite bathrooms.

Although bed linen was changed daily, there was no laundry aboard because of limited fresh-water supplies. Dirty linen was washed in the large laundries the company built adjoining the shipping line's docks, i.e. in Southampton, etc. Passengers could get their clothes pressed and shoes polished on request, for a small fee. Morning tea and pastries were served to passengers in their staterooms, but there was no room service in the modern sense – passengers had to go to the dining room to be served full breakfasts and other meals.

=== The Suites ===
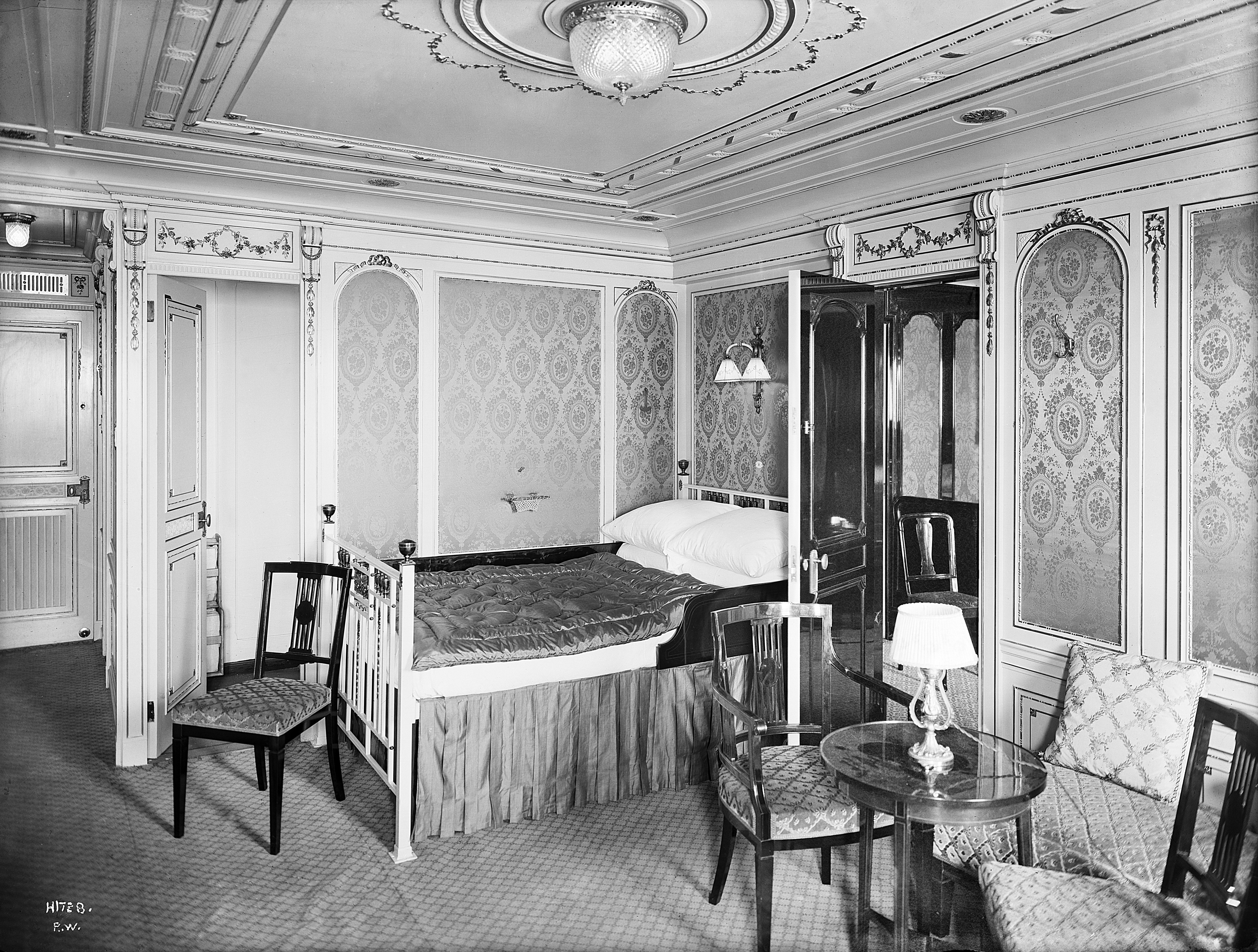
Stateroom B-58

Many of these staterooms had private entrances, separate servants' quarters, adjoining doors, wardrobe rooms, and en-suite bathrooms; and could be booked in groups to accommodate families and servants. All suites were decorated lavishly in the style of different historical periods. The space which had been given over to an encircling B-Deck promenade on the Olympic was converted to additional, large period inspired suites on Titanic, some of the finest on board. In total there were 39 suites located on B and C decks.

The most splendid suites on both the Titanic and the Olympic were the four parlour suites, two each on B and C Decks, just aft of the forward grand staircase landings. The two on B-Deck were advertised as "Deluxe" Parlour Suites, or Promenade Suites, because they each contained a private promenade deck 50 feet (15 m) in length. The promenade deck connected to the first-class gangway entrances immediately forward, enabling the copious amounts of luggage typically carried by the richest passengers to be loaded directly into their suites. The Parlour Suites each comprised two large bedrooms, two walk-in wardrobes, a private bathroom, lavatory, and a spacious sitting room. The sitting rooms were lavish rooms that allowed for receiving small parties of guests. Each featured a faux fireplace, large card table, plush sofas and chairs, sideboards, and writing desks.

The two private promenade decks were unique to the Titanic, decorated in half-timber Tudor panelling, wicker deck chairs, sofas, tables and potted plants. The deck chairs were cane, made by Dryad of Leicester. The chairman of the White Star Line, J. Bruce Ismay, occupied the port-side "Deluxe" Suite on the Titanic, while the starboard suite was occupied by the American millionaire Mrs. Charlotte Drake Cardeza, her son, and entourage.

=== Decor and range ===
The suites on B and C-Decks were richly appointed in 11 different period styles, including Adam, Louis XIV, XV, and XVI, French Empire, Georgian, Jacobean and Italian Renaissance. Some styles, like Adam or Louis XVI, had different variations used in certain staterooms which incorporated elements from other periods, bringing the total of different designs to 19 including the 11 base styles. In addition, there were two custom Harland and Wolff designs known as "Bedroom A" and "Bedroom B" which were used in a total of 43 bedrooms between B and C Decks. These were period-inspired but modernized and considered equal in quality to the 11 stringent period styles. Bedroom B was the plainer of the two, featuring fielded wood panels painted white, resting on a 3-foot high carved oak dado, and furnished with a brass or wooden bedstead. Bedroom A was known as the "French cabin" because it was Louis XV-inspired, featuring varnished oak panelling and Cabriolet furniture.

In the "special staterooms", there was a wide range of finely carved panelling, veneers, and marquetry made from exotic imported woods like mahogany, sycamore, walnut, oak and satinwood. Such was the attention to historic detail that every piece of furniture, light fixture, upholstery, and woodwork was recreated with an obsessive care for accuracy by designers and master craftsmen at Harland and Wolff. There were a small number of outside contractors hired to fit out select rooms or provide furnishings. The Dutch firm of H.P. Mutters & Zoon, for instance, fitted out twelve of the -"special staterooms" according to the chosen period styles, supplying everything from the paneling and doors down to the sofa pillows, down bed quilts, and wastepaper baskets.

First Class accommodation occupied almost the entirety of B and C Decks, but also large sections forward on A, D and E-Decks; a handful of First Class cabins were located on the Boat Deck between the forward grand staircase and officer's quarters. On E-Deck the First Class staterooms numbered E1 through E42 along the starboard side. Although all were equipped and furnished as First Class cabins and normally reserved for First Class, all but four were also considered to be "alternative" Second Class staterooms. Immediately aft of these First Class staterooms ran a sequence of "Second Class/Alternate First Class" cabins (E43-E88). These rooms were furnished and equipped for Second Class, with the exception of the heaters (a typical feature of First Class cabins) and carpeting (instead of linoleum) added to them. They could be used as First Class cabins in the event of high demand, and on Titanic E-43 through E-68 served this purpose during the voyage.

Only the starboard side of E-Deck belonged to First/Second Class; the whole of the Port side contained Third Class and Crew cabins. The First-Class corridors were in general very spartan in appearance, but the B and C Deck passageways which accessed the very finest staterooms were more impressive. These featured white-painted 'Venesta' panels (a durable type of plywood), pilasters, archways over the stateroom entrances, and a decorative frieze supported by gilt brackets running along the top of the walls which concealed the ventilation ducts and electrical wiring underneath. There were no handrails, no carpet runners, and lighting was provided by ormolu and cut-glass ceiling fixtures. On B Deck the two parallel corridors were enclosed by swinging baize-upholstered doors with louver panels, which muffled the sound coming from the stairwells and busy public rooms.

=== Condition in the wreck ===
There has been relatively little exploration of the First-Class staterooms on Titanic since her discovery. Only the staterooms in the bow section forward of the grand staircase survive in an appreciable condition. Because the cabins were all framed in pine and teak, many of the walls between staterooms have deteriorated, leaving a warren of tangled electrical wiring, deep silt and wreckage treacherous to ROVs. James Cameron's 2001 Ghosts of the Abyss expedition focused on the cabins of some of the most famous Titanic passengers, including Henry S. Harper, Molly Brown and Edith Russell. The expedition also captured images of the marble Adam-style fireplace in Mrs. Cardeza's sitting room, the gilded Louis Quinze fireplace of Bruce Ismay's sitting room, and remnants of the distinctive half-timber paneling from Ismay's Private Promenade.

The more common remains that delineate staterooms include desks and other hardwood furniture, collapsed bunks, silver-plated lamps, doors, brass bed frames, and even upright cabinets with their contents still in place on the shelves. In the debris field are strewn hundreds of items from first-class staterooms that poured out of the ship during the break-up.

== Sporting facilities ==
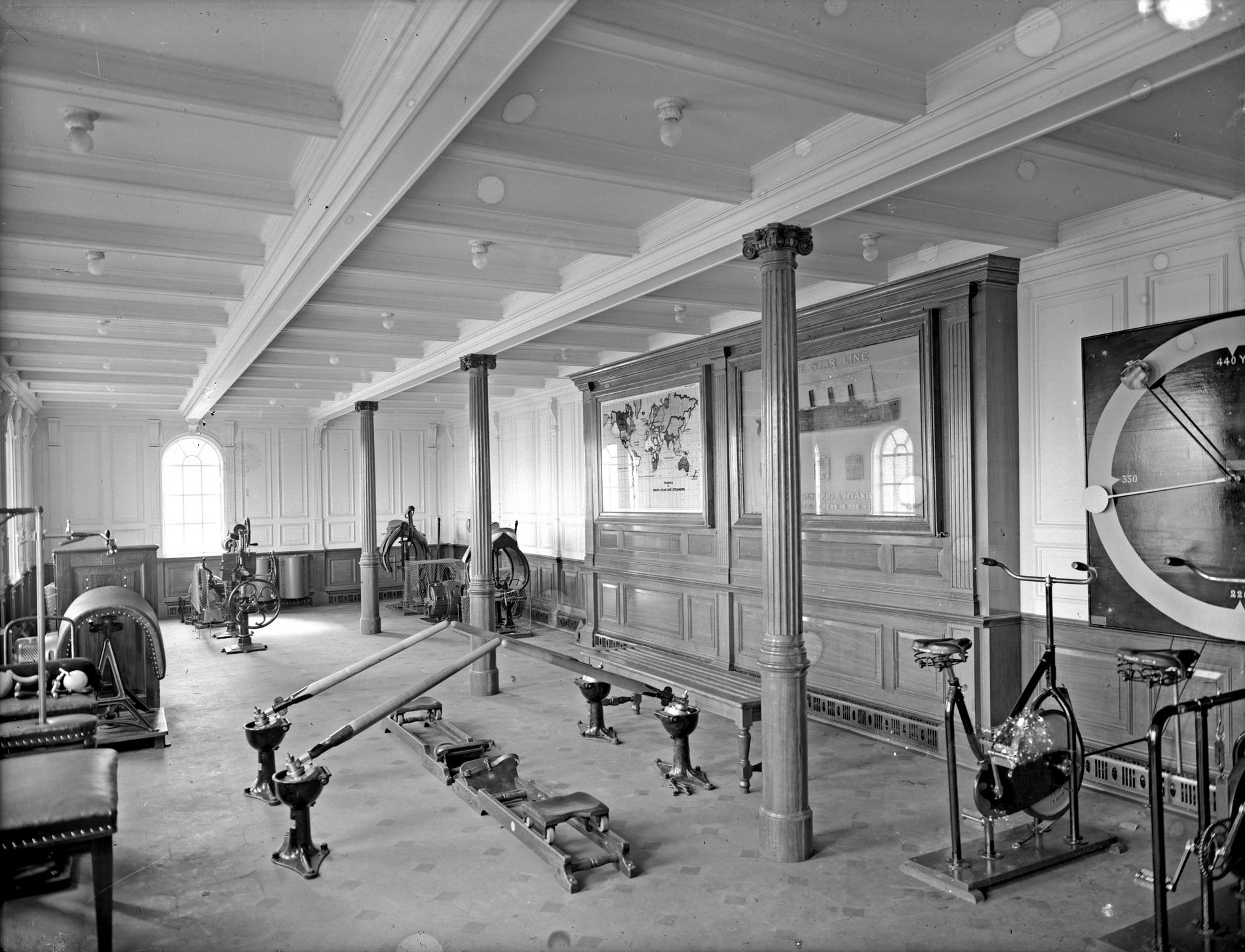
The gymnasium

The Titanic featured numerous sporting and relaxation facilities including:

- A gymnasium including a punch bag, a rowing machine, exercise bikes, stationary bicycles, two electric camels, and an electric horse.
- Turkish baths, electric baths, and steam room
- Private massage room
- Swimming pool
- Squash court
- Barber

=== Gymnasium ===
The first-class gymnasium was just aft of the forward grand staircase along the Starboard side of the Boat Deck. It was a brightly lit room with white-painted oak panelling and tile floors. Along the wall opposite the entrance was a carved oak installation with an illustrated cutaway of an Olympic-class ocean liner and a map depicting the travel routes of the White Star Line throughout the world. The room was equipped with state-of-the-art exercise equipment manufactured in Wiesbaden, including two electric camels, an electric horse, a rowing machine, punching bag, a weightlifting machine and mechanical bicycles.

There was a permanent "Physical Educator" on staff named T.W. McCawley who assisted passengers in using the devices. The gymnasium was open during the following hours and, like other recreational facilities aboard the Titanic, segregated by gender and age:

- 9:00 am – 12:00 pm for Ladies Only
- 1:00 – 3:00 pm for Children Only
- 2:00 – 6:00 pm for Gentlemen Only

The roof of the deck house which enclosed the gymnasium has long since collapsed and the room itself is sinking into the deck below. Nonetheless, the wood panelling that lined the walls is recognizable and so are some of the exercise machines.

=== Turkish baths ===
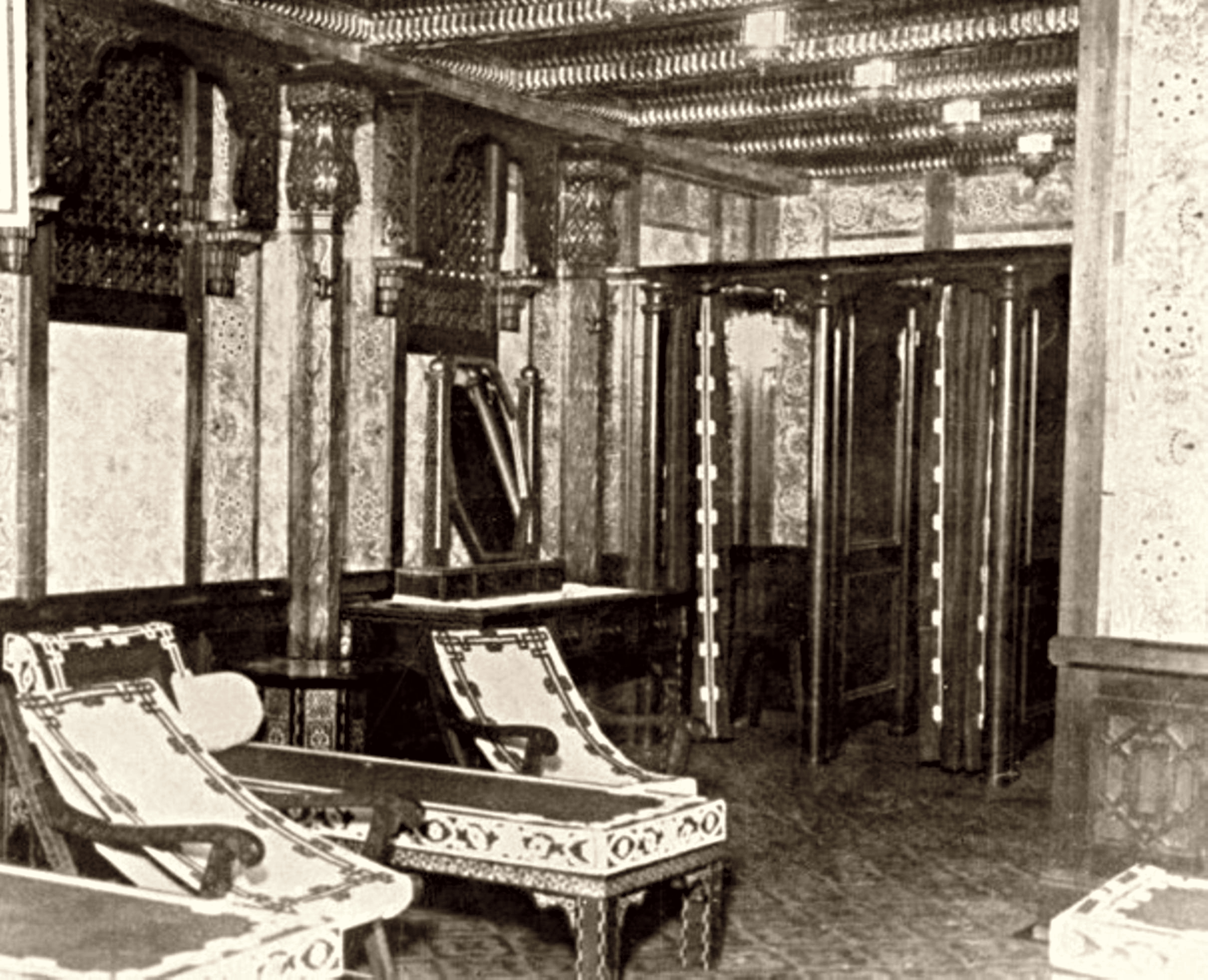
The only known authentic picture of Titanics Turkish Baths Cool Room

Along the Starboard side of F-Deck were the Victorian Turkish baths for first-class passengers. Besides the Titanic, of the White Star liners, only RMS Adriatic (1906) and RMS Olympic (1911) featured Turkish baths on board, although one was being built at about the same time on the HAPAG (Hamburg America Line) SS Imperator. The Titanic baths comprised a Temperate Room, a Cool Room, a Hot Room, and two Shampooing Rooms where massage was performed. Complementing the Turkish baths, and within the same area, were a Steam Room and an electric bath.

The Baths were segregated by sex, available to women between 9:00 a.m. and 12:00 p.m., and to men between 2:00 p.m. and 6:00 p.m. There was a charge of 4 shillings (£20 in 2025) or $1, per person for admission.

The Cool Room was the central feature of the Turkish Baths, decorated in a mix of Moorish/Arabic styles. The walls were adorned with glossy blue-green tiles, richly carved teak, and bronze lamps. Against one wall was a marble drinking fountain. The ceiling was deeply recessed and painted a deep crimson, with gilded beams and hanging lanterns, supported by pillars encased in teak. Unlike the Olympic, the Titanic's cooling room was inboard and thus did not have an exterior wall so included were "fake" portholes concealed by a carved Cairo curtain. The doorways were adorned with gilded semi-domes to lend an exotic effect. Throughout the room were teak folding chairs, Damascus tables and cushioned chaise longues for relaxation. There were also small curtained cubicles for changing. Also unlike Olympic's the Titanic's did not feature bronze table lamps.

==== Condition in the wreck ====
The Cool Room was rediscovered in 2005 during a filming expedition for James Cameron's documentary Last Mysteries of the Titanic, in a remarkable state of preservation. The room would have flooded early in the sinking and its location deep within the ship insulated it from damage when the bow hit the sea bed. It is largely protected from the destructive microbes and sea creatures which consume more exposed parts of the ship; because of this the woodwork is in good condition, even the delicate recliners and framework for the dressing rooms survive in recognizable condition.

=== Swimming pool ===
Across the corridor from the Turkish Baths was a heated swimming pool measuring 30 feet (9.1 m) by 14 feet (4.3 m) with a depth of 7 feet (2.1 m). Water depth was 5 feet 4 inches (1.63 m) at the deep end and 4 feet 6 inches (1.37 m) at the shallow end. Heated salt water from a tank and cold sea water were pumped into the pool once the ship was out to sea. The room offered 13 changing cubicles and 2 shower stalls for convenience. The floors were tiled in blue and white linoleum, and a marble stair with teak footholds descended into the pool. The pool cost 1 shilling (£5 in 2025) or $0.25 to use but was open to men free of charge between 6 and 8 a.m., for early morning exercise. The Olympic featured two diving boards which proved to be a safety hazard for divers, so they were not installed on Titanic. When the ship was moving the amount of water which sloshed back and forth could make the diving-end deceptively shallow.

==== Condition in the wreck ====
The entrance to the swimming pool is blocked by a closed watertight door along the bulkhead and so its condition remains unknown.

=== Squash court ===
The Titanic featured a squash/racquet court in the bow, deep within the ship on G-Deck. It measured 30 ft. long × 20 ft. wide and, like the gymnasium, had its own instructor on staff, Mr. Frederick Wright (he died in the sinking). There was an accompanying Spectator's Gallery on F-Deck overlooking the court. It could be entered only by a separate staircase starting on D-Deck, from where a passenger would descend the three decks past the viewing platform to G-Deck. The charge to play was 2 shillings (£10 in 2025) or $0.50, for half an hour.

=== Barber shop ===
A small barber shop was located just off the aft grand staircase on C-Deck, open between 7:00 a.m. and 7:00 p.m. There was a barber permanently on staff who offered shampooing, shaving, and hairdressing services for 1 shilling (£5 in 2025) or $0.25 each. The room itself was installed with two swivel chairs, a marble countertop with two sinks, and leather-padded waiting bench.

The barber shop also offered small souvenirs and collectables for purchase, including postcards, White Star branded trinkets, tobacco, dolls, penknives, and hats.

== Cafés and restaurants ==
=== À la Carte Restaurant ===
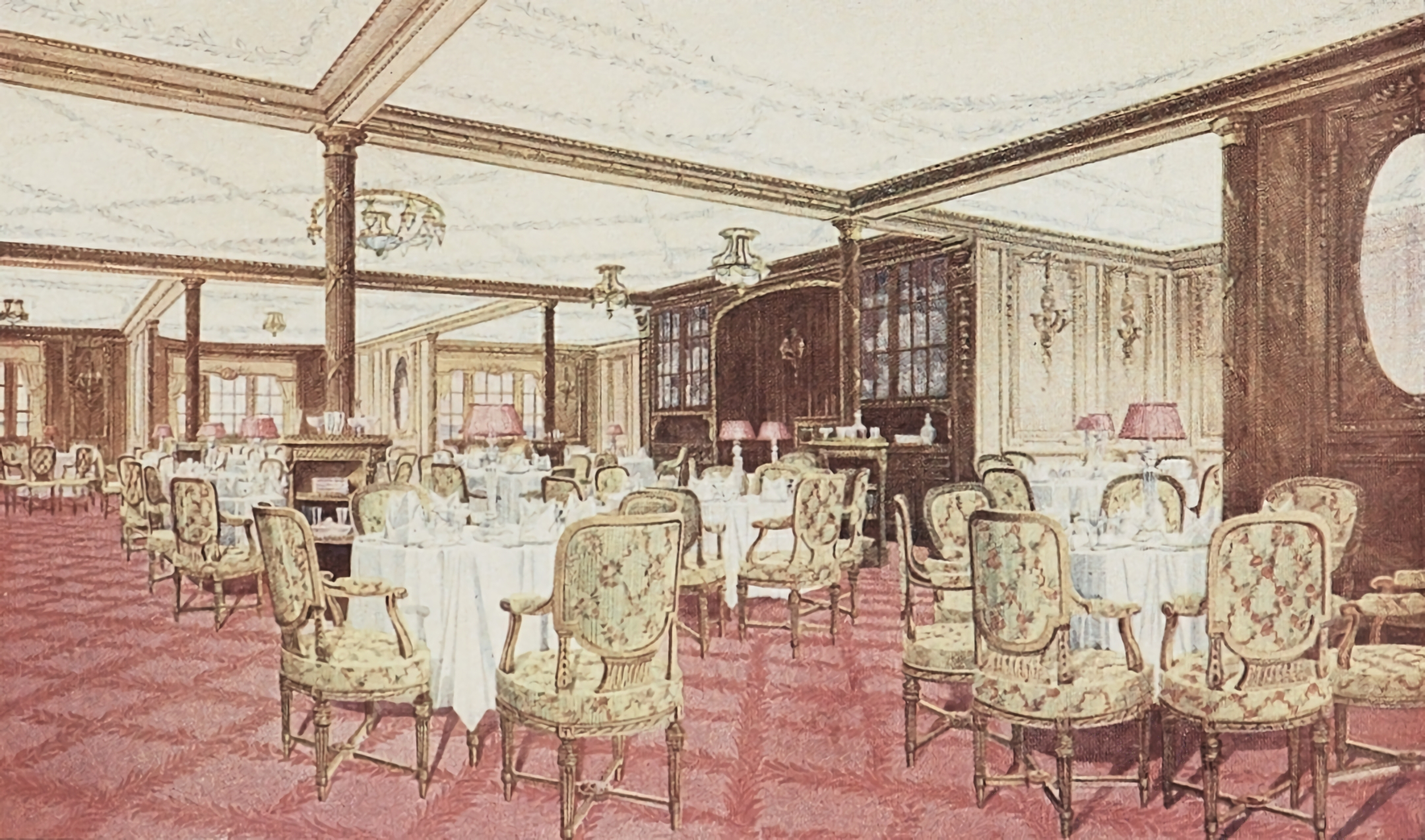
White Star Line's illustration of Titanic's À la Carte restaurant

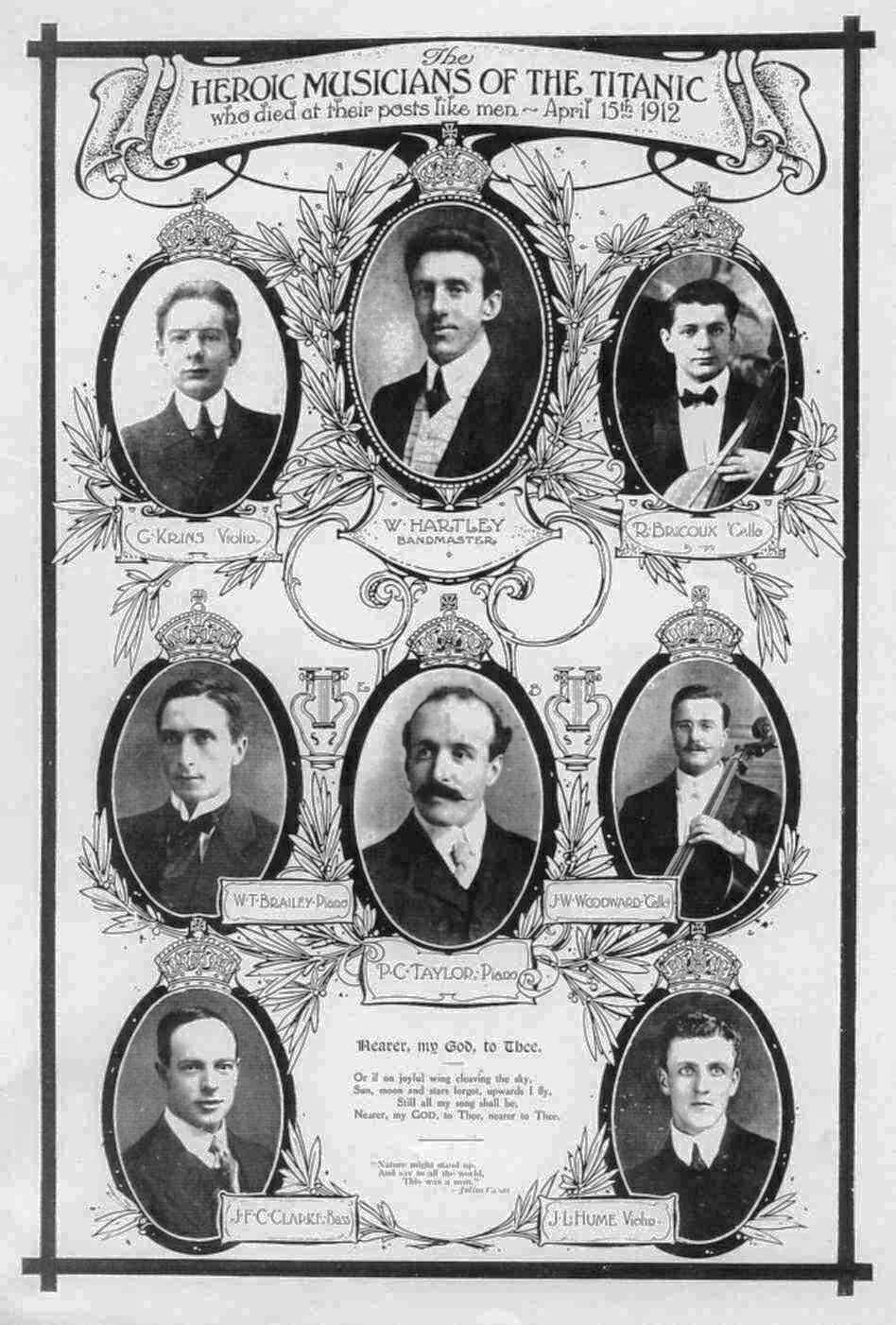
The Titanic's trio played in the À la Carte Restaurant's reception room while the quintet played mainly in the first-class reception room on D-Deck

The À la Carte Restaurant was a luxurious restaurant open exclusively to first-class passengers. The Olympic and Titanic were the first British ships to feature restaurants separate from their main dining saloons. This was in imitation of the Ritz restaurant first featured on board the Hamburg-Amerika liner SS Amerika in 1905, which had proven to be enormously popular. The restaurant could accommodate 137 diners at a time. On the Olympic the room was sandwiched between the Second-Class promenades on either side, making it smaller than the version on Titanic, whose restaurant extended to the port side of the ship and whose starboard-side promenade deck was converted to the Café Parisien.

The restaurant was the preferred alternative to the main dining saloon and gave passengers the option of enjoying lavish French haute cuisine at an additional cost. A passenger could choose to eat exclusively in the restaurant for the duration of the voyage and receive a £3-£5 rebate on his/her ticket at the time of booking. Unlike the main dining saloon, the restaurant gave passengers the freedom to eat whenever they liked (between 8 am and 11 pm). The restaurant was not managed by the White Star Line; Luigi Gatti ran it as a concession and his staff were not part of the regular crew.

The restaurant was one of the most luxurious rooms on the ship, decorated in the Louis XVI style, with exquisitely carved French walnut panelling trimmed in gilt-brass accents. Fluted columns interspersed throughout the room were carved with gilded ribbons and the plaster ceilings were delicately molded with flower and ribbon motifs. Mirrors were installed within the panelling imitating windows and the room was divided into bays along either side with oval mirrors inset. Along the forward wall was a large buffet with a peach-coloured marble top and along the aft wall was a raised bandstand for the orchestra, with buffets on either side containing the silver service and cutlery. The Restaurant featured its own custom Spode china service in gilt and cobalt blue. Axminster carpeting in Rose du Barry covered the floors and the plush chairs of French walnut were upholstered in pink rose-patterned Aubusson tapestry. Standard lamps with crystal stems and rose coloured silken lightshades illuminated each table. The À la Carte Restaurant provided the most intimate atmosphere on board. In fact, half of the tables in the restaurant catered for two people, whereas very few of such tables were offered in the main dining saloon.

The passengers often referred to the restaurant as the Ritz. Ms. Walter Douglas, a first-class passenger who survived the sinking, gave her account of the À la Carte Restaurant:

It was the last word in luxury. The tables were grey with pink roses and white daisies […] the stringed orchestra playing music from Puccini and Tchaikovsky. The food was superb: caviar, lobster, quail from Egypt, plovers' eggs, and hothouse grapes and fresh peaches.

On the night of the sinking, the Wideners, a wealthy couple from Philadelphia, hosted a dinner party at the restaurant in honour of Captain Smith.

==== Artifacts and Fittings from the À la Carte Restaurant ====
The 2001 Ghosts of the Abyss expedition attempted to gain entry to the À la Carte Restaurant, only to find that the aft end of A and B Decks in the seriously damaged stern section had collapsed upon one another. Relatively few artifacts have been recovered from the debris field that are identified with the À la Carte Restaurant. The most noteworthy is the door from a safe once contained in the Restaurant office which is displayed in various travelling exhibitions. Other pieces are a twisted gilt-brass light chandelier, a gilded wall sconce, and many intact pieces from the Spode china dinner service believed to have been made for the Restaurant. In 2012 a paper menu pad from the restaurant was displayed with the travelling Titanic exhibition in Las Vegas.

Much of the exquisite gilded woodwork from the Olympic's À la Carte Restaurant was purchased before her scrapping and survived for years in private homes in the North of England. In 2000 Celebrity Cruises purchased the panelling, with mirrors and sconces, from the owners of a private home in Sheffield and installed them in a new RMS Olympic-themed restaurant aboard the Celebrity Millennium. Another home was found to contain about 24 panels from the restaurant in 2012.

=== Dining saloon ===
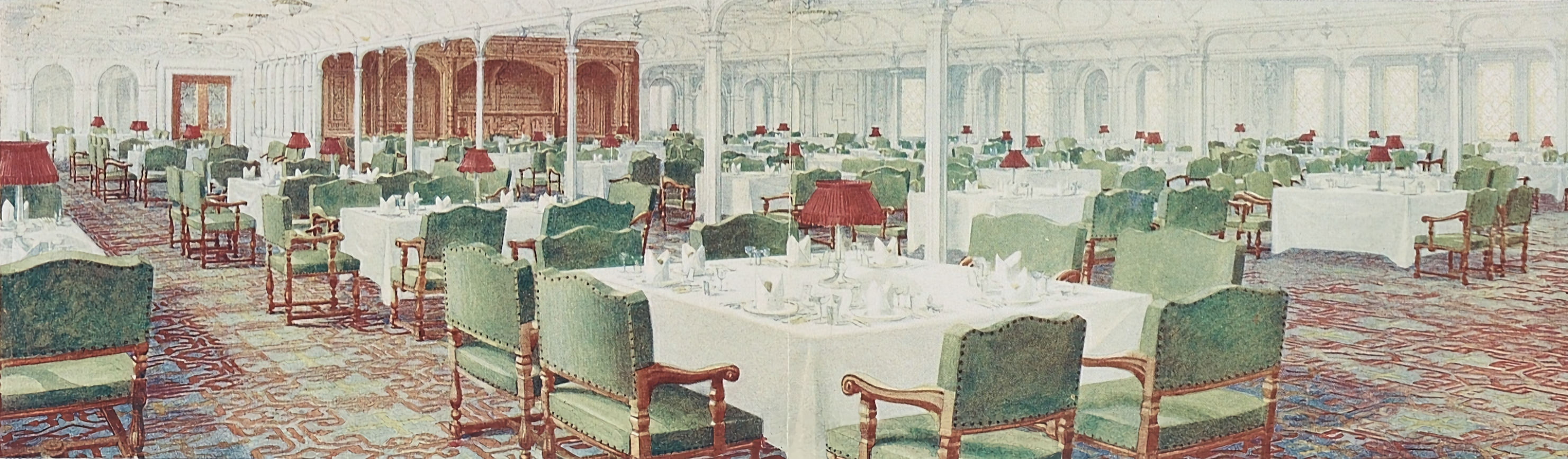
White Star Line's illustration of Titanic's first-class dining saloon

On D Deck, there was an enormous first-class dining saloon, 114 ft. long x 92 ft. wide. Measuring 1,000 m^{2} in area, it was the largest room on board any ship in 1912, and accommodated up to 554 passengers. The ship's designers had originally planned to build an extravagant two-storey dining saloon topped by a dome for the Titanic and her sisters, like those on the rival Cunard liners Lusitania and Mauretania. This was vetoed early in the design stages in favour of a lavish single deck saloon which nonetheless greatly exceeded its Cunard rivals in terms of space.

The dining saloon was decorated in wooden panelling carved in the Jacobean style and painted in glossy white enamel. There were two aisles the length of the room which created a large central dining area delineated by pillars. At both the aft and forward end of this central area were two elaborately carved oak buffet stations that contrasted warmly with the otherwise entirely white room. On either side of the central seating area the room was divided into alcoves by partition walls with arched windows. In total, there were 115 tables, set for two to twelve people. Children were allowed to eat here with their parents, as long as the dining saloon was not fully booked.

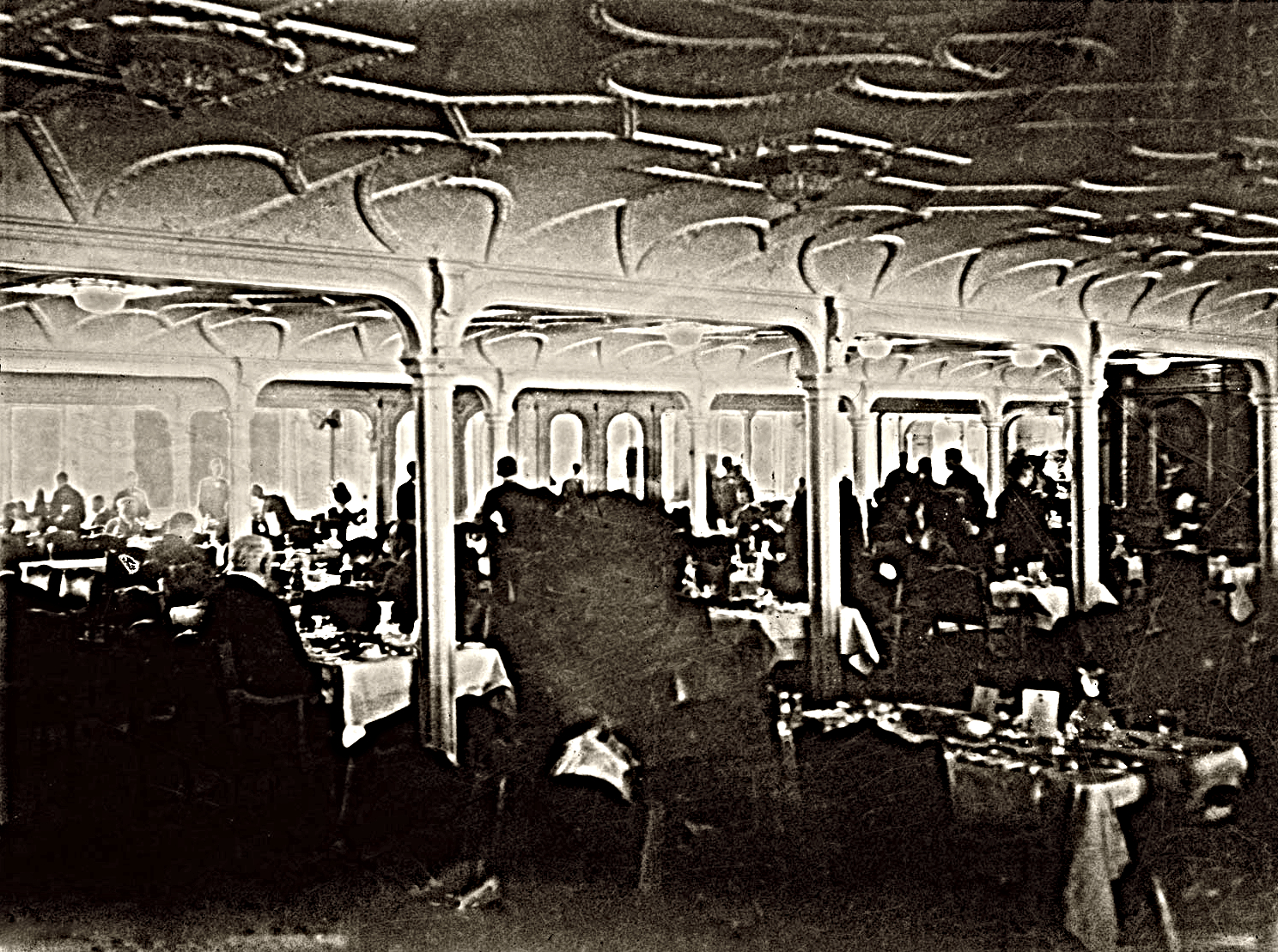
The only known photo of Titanic's first-class dining saloon. All other photos were from her near-identical sister-ship, Olympic.

The Titanic's dining saloon featured red and blue linoleum tiles. The furniture was made of oak and chairs upholstered in dark green leather, unusual in the fact that they were not swivel chairs bolted to the floor (a standard feature in other first-class dining saloons of the time). The rooms' portholes were elegantly concealed by rectangular 5 ft. tall leaded-glass windows, giving passengers the impression that they were eating onshore instead of at sea. For even more atmosphere, the windows were lit from behind during the evening meals. The dining saloon's meals were prepared in the galley next door, which also serviced the second-class dining saloon, located further aft on D Deck.

On the Titanic a seating chart for diners was drafted that remained in place the length of the voyage, though passengers could make special seating requests with the Purser at the beginning of the voyage. The dining saloon was open between 8 and 10 am for breakfast, 1 and 2:30 pm for lunch, and 6 and 7:30 pm for dinner. Passengers could dine up to 8:15 at the latest, but only on request in advance to a steward. A bugle call to the tune of "The Roast Beef of Old England" was sounded half an hour in advance of lunch or dinner by the ship's bugler, Peter W. Fletcher, so that passengers could dress, before a second call signalling the start of the meal. On Sundays, beginning at 10:30 am, the dining saloon was also used for the Anglican Church service, which was conducted by the captain or, in his absence, by a minister travelling in first class. The service was accompanied by a quintet, which included a piano. Contrary to what has often been portrayed in films, the orchestra did not play during meals.

==== Condition in the wreck, and artifacts ====
Not until filming for James Cameron's Ghosts of the Abyss in 2001 was the Dining Saloon explored. Located mid-ship, most of the room has collapsed – the aft end was severed during the break-up of the ship, allowing its contents to spill out. The very forward starboard part survived and was accessible from the reception room, the partition wall having deteriorated. Surviving in this part were two of the rectangular leaded-glass windows still in situ along with remnants of wooden panelling, gilded brass light fixtures (dangling from their cords), and the cast iron supports for the tables.

Several of the Titanic's dining room chairs were recovered by the Mackay Bennett as wreckage in the weeks after the sinking, as is attested in photographs. Several of the bronze grilles from the swinging doors in the dining saloon have been identified in the debris field, along with innumerable pieces of silverware, china, and glassware from the dining saloon service.

=== Verandah Café ===
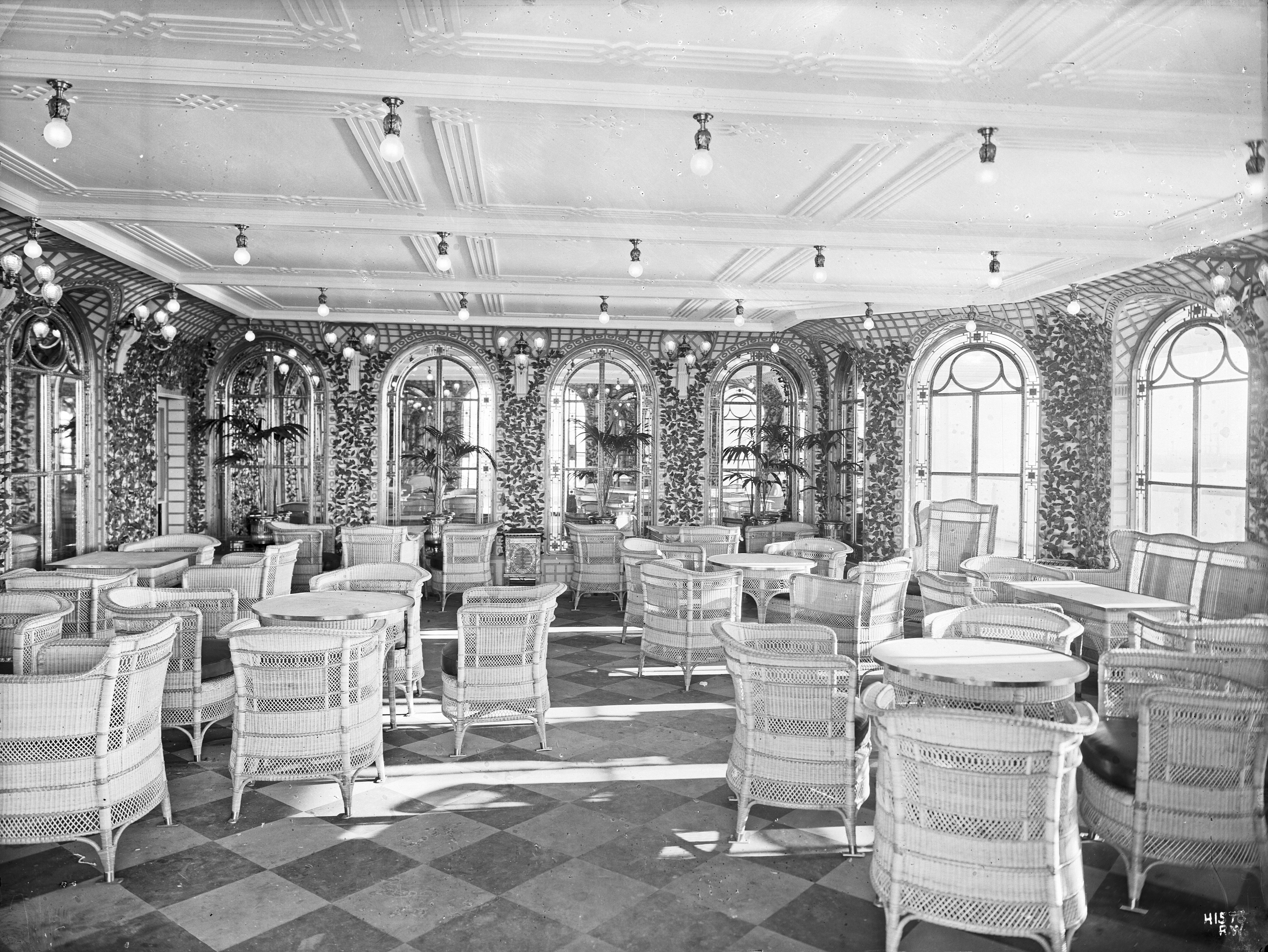
Olympic's Verandah Café

The Verandah Café (also known as the Palm Court, or the Verandah and Palm Court) was divided into two rooms, located on both sides of the second-class staircase, on A Deck. Reminiscent of an outdoor sidewalk café, its rooms were brightly lit by large windows and double sliding doors that opened onto the aft end of the first-class Promenade Deck. The café was elegantly furnished with wicker tables and chairs, spread out across a checkerboard tiled floor in light brown and beige. Various outdoor plants filled the rooms, including potted Kentia palms and ivy-covered trellises. It offered commanding views of the ocean but was fully enclosed so that it could be enjoyed in all types of weather, unlike the open-air cafés on Lusitania and Mauretania. First-class passengers could enjoy a selection of refreshments in the café.

The Verandah Café had both smoking and non-smoking sections. The smoking section, located on the port side, was accessible from the first-class smoking room. The non-smoking section, located on the starboard side, was closed to traffic from the smoking room and on occasion used as a play area by mothers and children. To note, no such official area existed on board. Contrary to the Titanic's, the Olympic's non-smoking section was frequently deserted.

The Verandah Café was similar in style on both the Olympic and the Titanic. While there are many photos of the Olympic's café, only one photo of the Titanic's remains today. The room was in the stern and was torn apart by the severe implosions which occurred on the descent to the ocean floor; on the wreck the remnants of A-Deck have collapsed. A fragment of the decorative bronze grille from the upper part of one of the Verandah and Palm Court windows was recovered in 1994 by Premiere Exhibitions and has been displayed in its various exhibitions.

=== Café Parisien ===
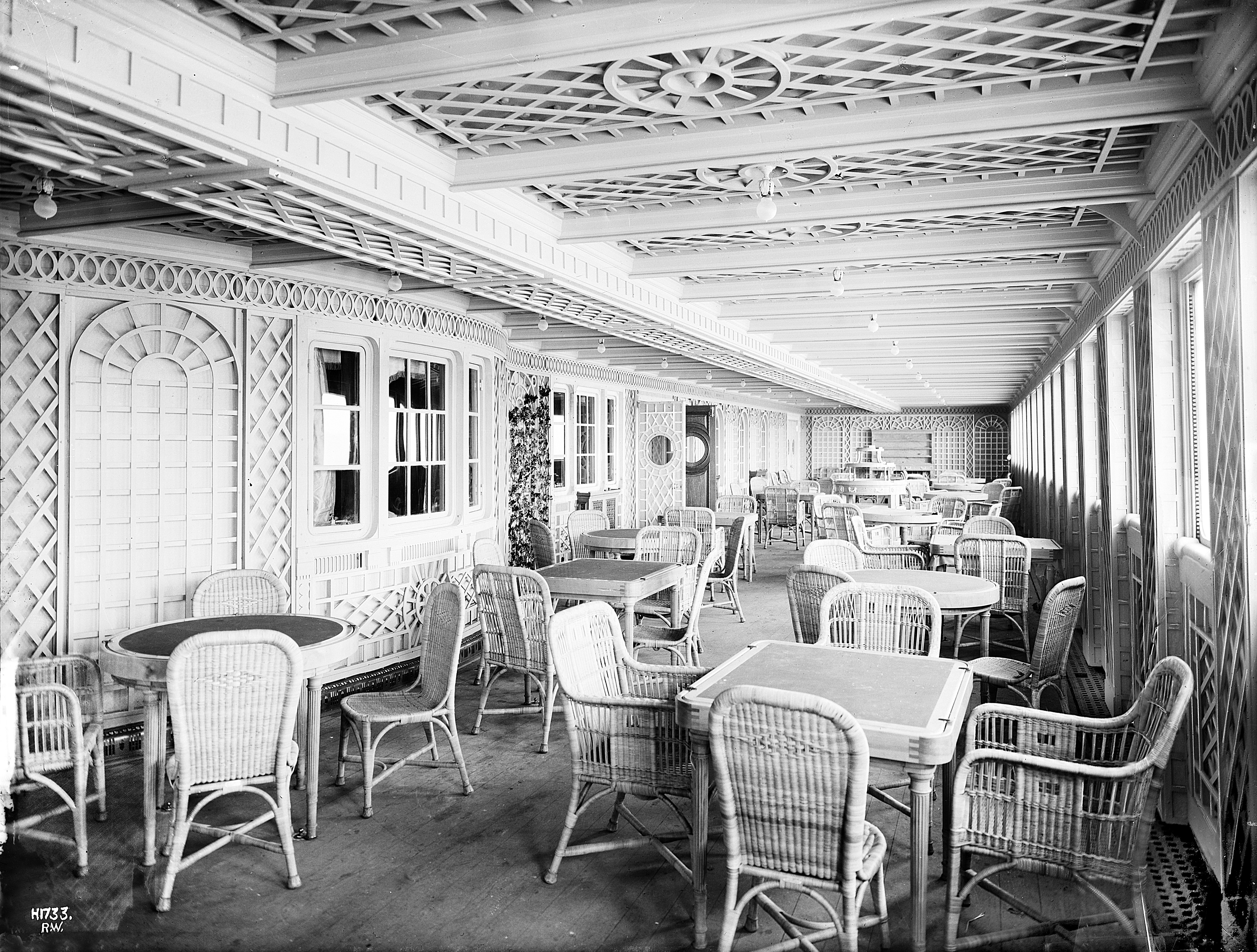
The Titanic's Café Parisien before climbing plants were later added to its trellised walls

The Café Parisien was a new feature on the Titanic, designed to occupy a part of the space which on the Olympic served as a rarely used B-Deck promenade. Located on the starboard side, the café was connected to the À la Carte Restaurant.

Like the restaurant, the Café Parisien was open from 8:00 am to 11:00 pm and shared the same menu and servers. The café was furnished with wicker tables and chairs, accommodating up to 68 passengers, and was decorated in ivy-covered trellises and other climbing plants. There was a tiered buffet stand in the centre of the room and sideboards were sited at each end of the room containing the china service. The Café Parisien was most popular among young adults.

In 1912, the British magazine The Shipbuilder gave the following description of the café:

...a Café Parisien, which is an entirely new feature on board ship, has been arranged in connection with the restaurant, and here lunches and dinners can be served under the same excellent conditions and with all the advantages of the restaurant itself...it will be seen that this café has the appearance of a charming sun-lit verandah, tastefully decorated in French trellis-work with ivy and other creeping plants, and is provided with small groups of chairs surrounding convenient tables.

At the time the Titanic struck the iceberg, passengers Paul Chevré, Pierre Maréchal, Alfred Omant and Lucian Smith were playing cards in the Café.

== Gathering places ==
There were many other venues that could be visited by first-class passengers, including:

- Reception room
- Lounge
- Smoking room (men only)
- Reading and writing room
- Promenade deck
- Grand staircase

=== Smoking room ===
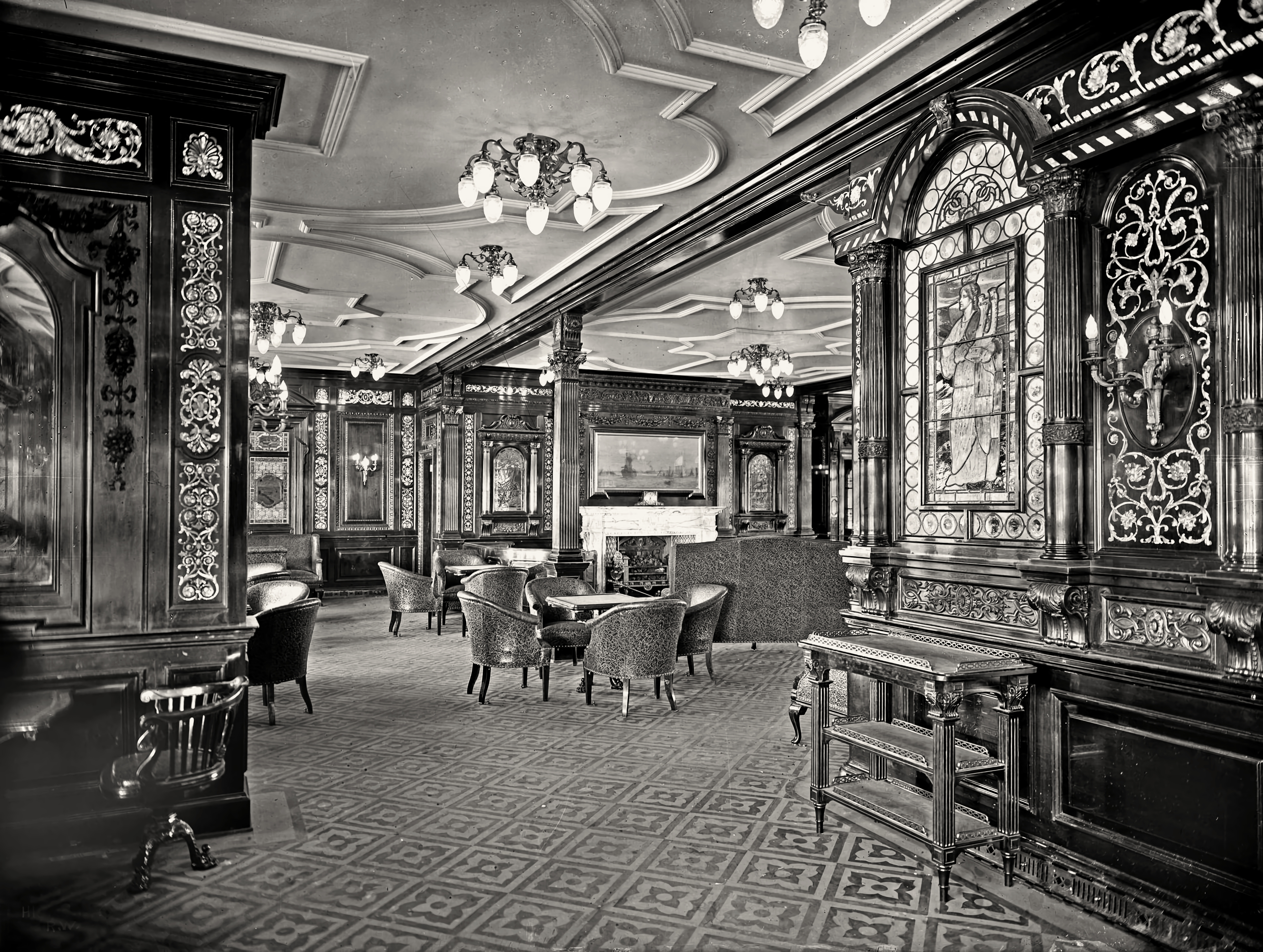
Reconstruction of Titanic's first-class smoking room, created from an original picture of the same room aboard the Olympic, which was quite similar. There are no known photos of this room on board the Titanic.

First-class male passengers could enjoy a Georgian style smoking room, found at the aft end of A Deck just off the aft grand staircase. In keeping with social conventions of the time, the room was exclusive to men. In order to recreate the same atmosphere of a gentlemen's club, the room was decorated with dark mahogany panelling inlaid with mother-of-pearl and richly carved. Numerous large stained-glass windows were installed in pedimented niches within the panelling, illuminated from behind. Like the lounge, the ceilings and windows were raised above the level of the Boat Deck for increased height and the room was flanked by alcoves with bay windows, also in stained-glass.

The floor was laid with blue and red linoleum tiles and the plaster ceiling was moulded with plaster medallions. In the centre of the far-back wall was a Norman Wilkinson painting, Plymouth Harbor, which hung over a coal-burning fireplace in white marble. This was the only real fireplace on board: the others were installed with electric heaters. Square tables with raised edges (to prevent drink spillage in rough weather) dotted the room, surrounded by round club chairs upholstered in leather, of an unknown colour (probably green or burgundy).

To the right of the fireplace was a revolving door which led to the Verandah Café. The room was U-shaped because the ventilation shaft from the Turbine Engine Room occupied the forward end. This area also included bathrooms.

The Smoking Room was the preferred spot of gamblers who crossed the Atlantic. Professional card sharks also travelled on board under aliases, and the purser could do nothing but warn passengers about these swindlers, since passengers played at their own risk. At least four professional players travelled on board the Titanic. Cigars and drinks could be made available upon request of the passengers, and were provided by the stewards of the adjacent bar. The bar stopped serving at 11:30 pm and the Smoking Room itself closed at midnight.

==== Condition in wreck, and artifacts ====
The Smoking Room was destroyed during the sinking, being located just aft of where the break-up occurred in an area that was ripped apart during the stern's plunge to the sea floor. No pictures of the Titanic's Smoking Room are known, only those of the Olympic. Certain artifacts which once decorated the room have been recovered from the debris field, including two of the gilt-bronze chandeliers, and portions of the red and blue linoleum floor tiles.

=== First-class lounge ===
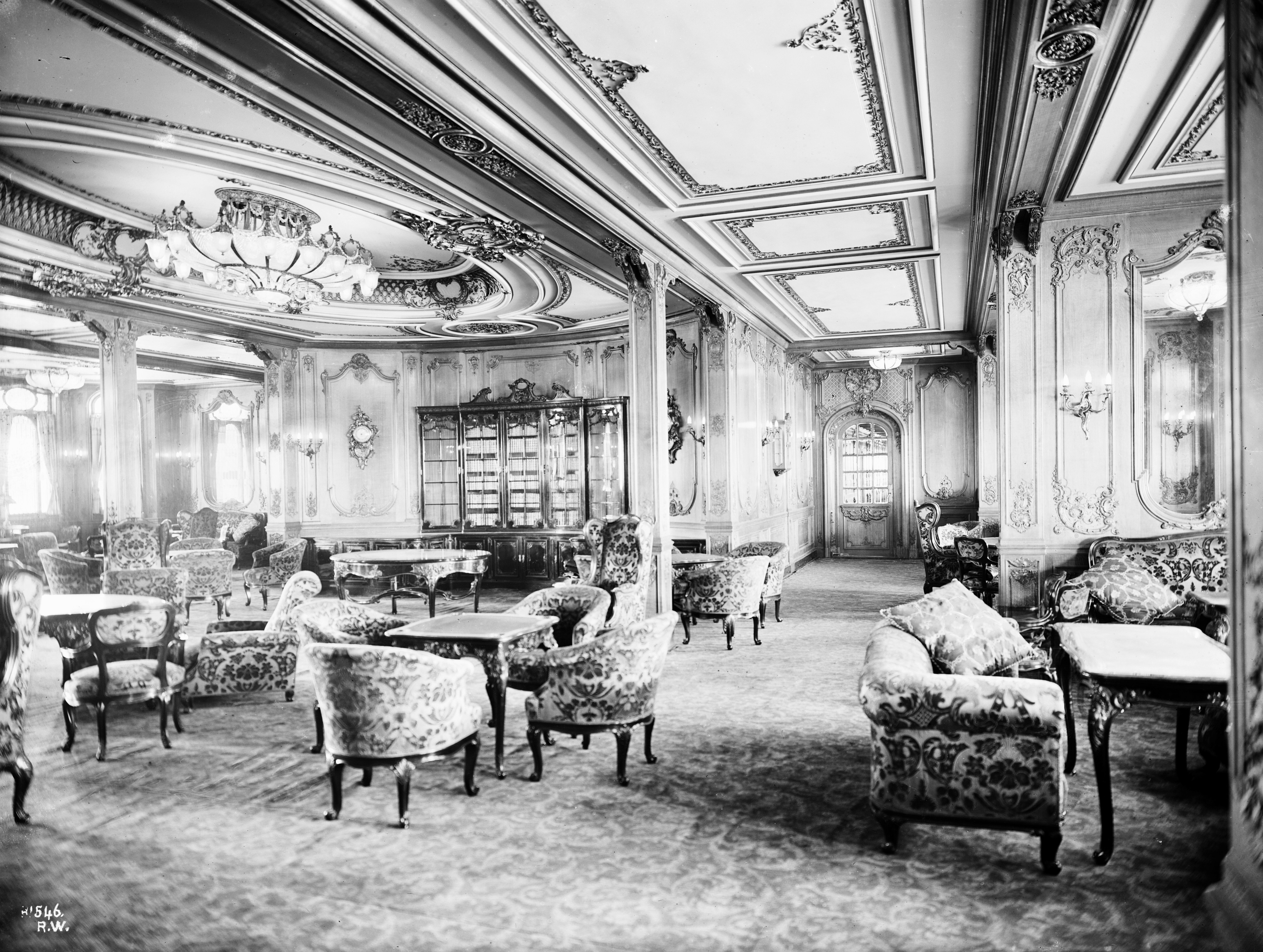
The Olympic's first-class lounge

The first-class lounge was one of the most ornate public rooms on board the Titanic, modelled in the Louis XV style after the Palace of Versailles. It occupied a large space mid-ship on A-Deck, offering views onto the Promenade Deck and the ocean beyond. Intricately carved English oak panelling with intermittent motifs of musical instruments were the dominant feature of the room. Bronze sconces and large rounded mirrors were installed throughout. A 49-light opaque glass and ormolu Electrolier with crystal embellishment occupied the central recess of the ceiling, which was itself elaborately molded with instrumental motifs. Adjoining the open seating area were cosy alcoves with inset mirrors and tall bay windows of leaded and stained glass.

The lounge had an impressive height of 12 ft. 3 in., enabled by raising the ceiling above the level of the Boat-Deck. Groups of tables and chairs, sofas, and armchairs upholstered in plush velvet with green and gold floral patterns were scattered throughout. At the centre of the forward wall was a gracefully carved grey marble decorative fireplace (it contained only an electric heater). A replica statue of Diana of Versailles stood on the mantelpiece, with a large mirror above. At the opposite end the wall curved and contained a wide mahogany bookcase which functioned as a lending library for first-class passengers. They could choose from a permanent collection of classics and the latest releases, which were freshly stocked on every voyage.

Open daily between 8 am and 11 pm, the room was used primarily for socializing and the taking of tea, coffee and light refreshment before and after dinner, serviced by a small connecting bar. It was a largely female domain but available to both sexes; because of its size it was also convenient for holding concerts and other first-class events, as is attested on the Olympic.

==== Artifacts from the lounge ====
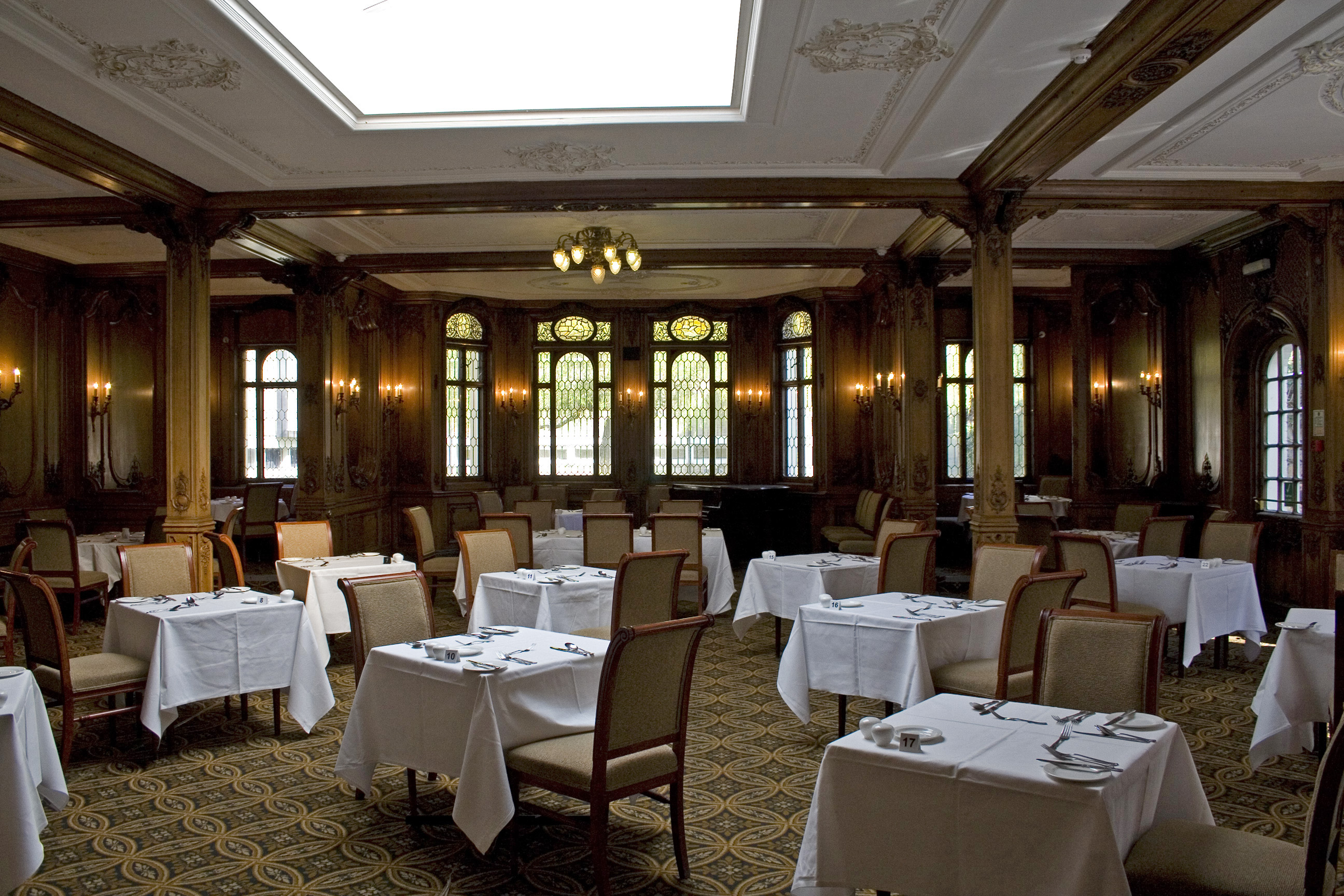
The first-class lounge of Olympic is currently installed as a dining room in the White Swan Hotel, Alnwick.

The Titanic's lounge was destroyed when the ship broke apart, being located in an area where the midsection decks collapsed upon impact with the ocean floor. Several pieces of wreckage from the lounge have been identified in the debris field surrounding the wreck, including the Artemis statue, bronze sconces, and portions of the window frames. A beautifully carved piece of oak panelling that once hung above the forward entrance to the lounge was recovered as wreckage and can be seen at the Maritime Museum of the Atlantic in Halifax, along with an oak leg from one of the lounge tables.

The panelling and fittings of the lounge on Titanic's sister ship Olympic, which were identical to those of the Titanic, have been largely preserved in the dining room of the White Swan Hotel in Alnwick, England. They were installed after being purchased at auction when the Olympic was scrapped in 1935. This room gives the best approximation of how the lounge appeared on the Olympic and thereby the Titanic. The impressive Electrolier of the Olympic is also preserved at Cutler's Hall in Sheffield, England.

=== Reading and writing room ===
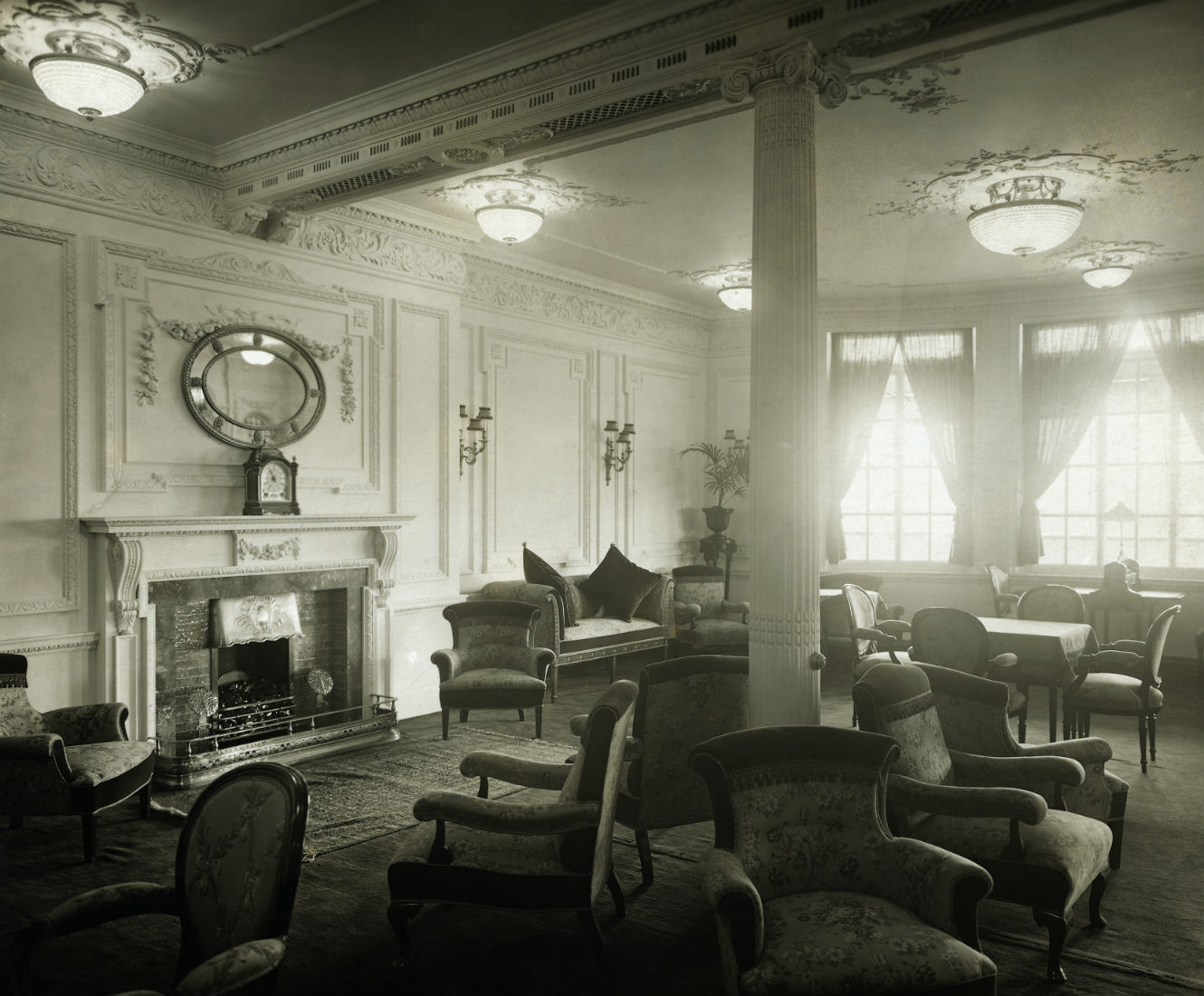
The Olympic's Reading and Writing Room

As the title indicates, the reading and writing room was a leisurely space on A-Deck for relaxation, reading, and writing home to family and friends. The room was on the port side of the long corridor which connected the grand staircase to the lounge and was generally a female domain, though men could also use the room. It was divided into two zones with a spacious main area and a smaller seating alcove off to the right separated by a porticoed doorway with oeil-de-boeuf windows. Like the lounge, the room was raised above the Boat Deck, allowing for 11 ft. high windows and an enhanced feeling of spaciousness.

Decorated in a refined Georgian decorative order and painted white with dove gray accents, the room featured delicate plaster work combined with sleek paneling, fluted columns, and a white fireplace with red/maroon marble with white ribboning. Potted palms on tall stands were placed in the corners of the room, while shaded sconces and beaded crystal chandeliers provided soft lighting. Comfortable silk-upholstered settees and chairs in shades of yellow and burgundy were grouped around tables and writing desks for convenience. The windows were lined with pink silk curtains and looked out onto the Promenade Deck, allowing ample sunlight to flood the room. The popularity of this space had proved disappointing aboard the Olympic, and Thomas Andrews had plans to convert part of the room on the Titanic into further passenger quarters.

=== Reception room ===
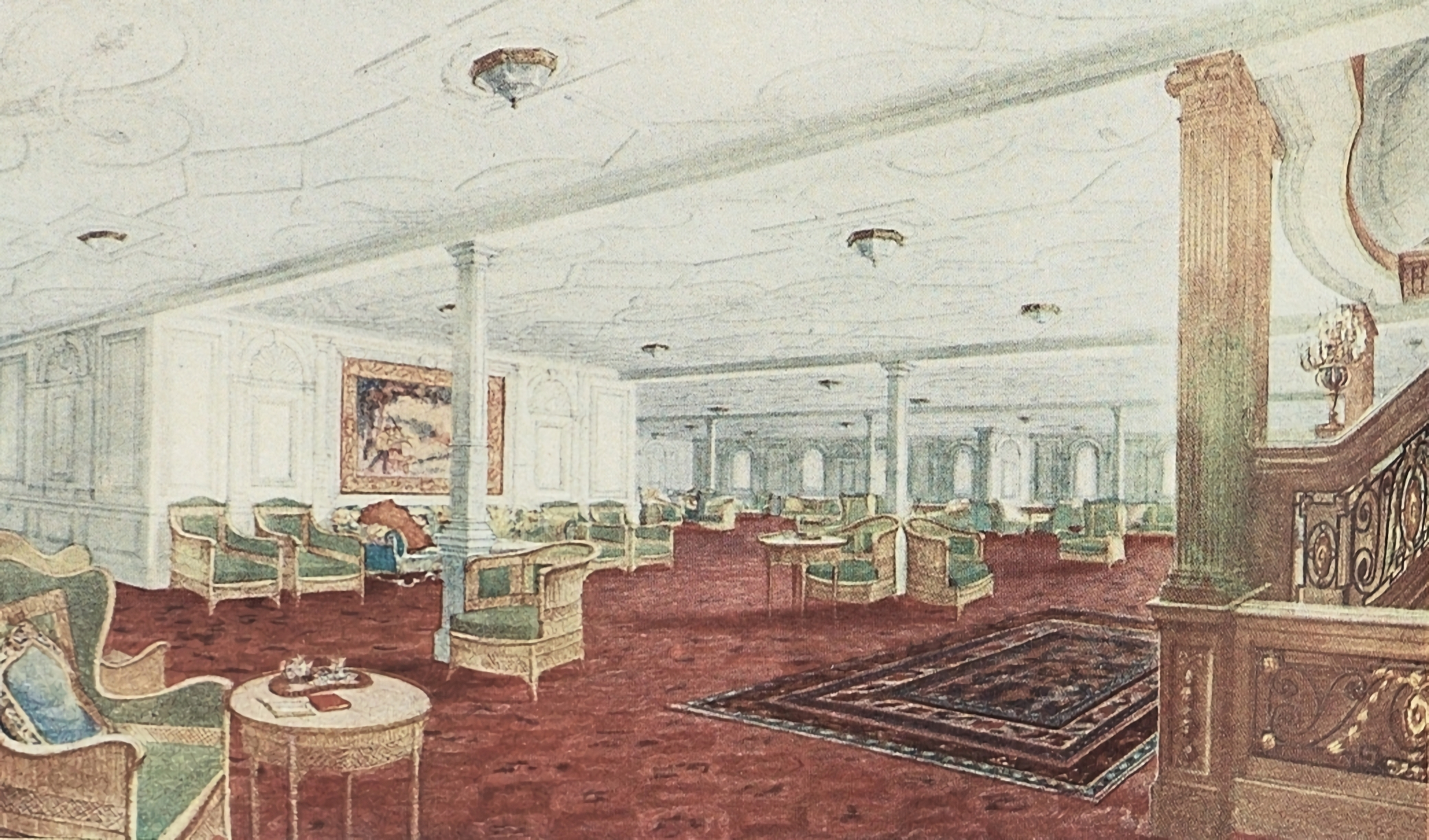
First-class reception room

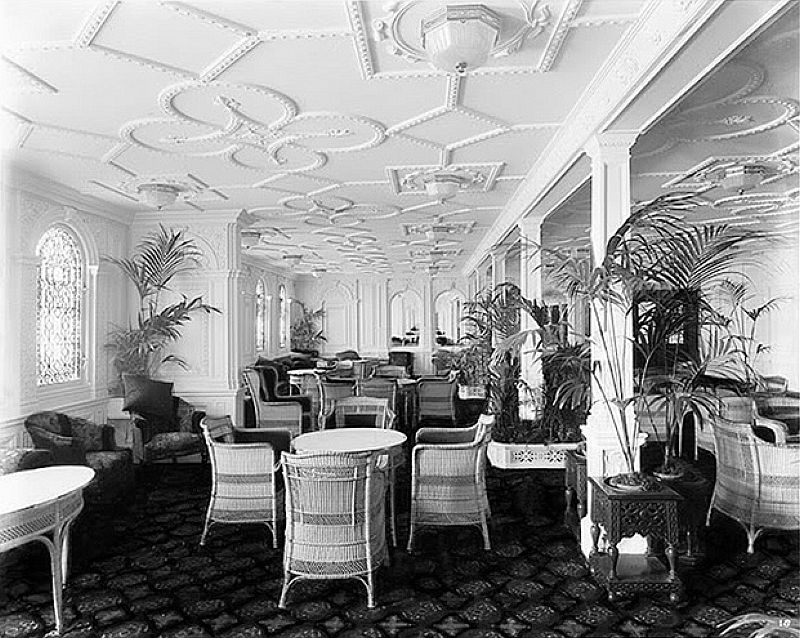
The Olympic's reception room looking towards the dining saloon

The first-class dining saloon on D-Deck was preceded by a large reception room, measuring 460 m^{2} (4,951 sq ft), located at the foot of the forward grand staircase and encompassing the entire width of the ship. An ornate candelabra rested on the middle railing at the base of the staircase, the light oak colour of which contrasted warmly with the white-painted reception room. The Reception area would have been the first impression of the Titanic for many first-class passengers entering through the two semi-enclosed entry vestibules on either side of the staircase. Around the corner from the reception room, forward of the staircase, was the set of three first-class elevators which ran the length of the stairwell.

The reception room was decorated in richly carved mahogany Jacobean-style panelling painted a glossy white. Furnished with comfortable wicker chairs and Chesterfields upholstered in green damask silk, the room would have been conspicuously light and airy because of the beautifully illuminated leaded-glass windows which ran along either side of the room. These were lit naturally during the day through portholes concealed behind the windows and electrically in the evening. In contrast to the linoleum floors on the Olympic, the Titanic's reception room was covered with plush Axminster carpeting and there were potted palms in built-in holders in the corners of the alcoves. An imposing Aubusson tapestry, La Chasse du duc de Guise, hung in front of the staircase. On the wall close to the tapestry were letters indicating the name of the deck.

It was recorded on the inaugural voyage of the Olympic, whose reception hall was slightly smaller, that the room quickly filled up after dinner. On the starboard side, there was an area reserved for a quintet and it held a Steinway grand piano. The Titanic's reception room was enlarged in contrast to her sister ship through a reconfiguration of the two entry vestibules, reducing their size and adding broad arched entrances opening onto the foyer in front of the elevators.

The reception room was open to passengers before and after meals. Here, the orchestra played from 4 to 5 pm while tea was served, then after dinner, from 8 to 9:15 pm. Stewards served liquor and cigars until 11 pm, at which time the hall closed. Generally, there were many spectators in the Room while the orchestra played.

==== Entrance vestibules ====
The Titanic and Olympic both featured duplicate entrance vestibules on their port and starboard sides within the D-Deck reception rooms. There were sets of double gangway doors within the hull, screened by wrought-iron grilles. The vestibules were partially enclosed areas in the same white Jacobean-style panelling, and each contained a large sideboard for storing china. One set of French doors led into the reception room, but there was also a broad, arched entryway leading to the elevators. Separate corridors led off of the vestibules to the first-class staterooms in the forward part of D-Deck.

The Titanic's vestibules differed from those on the Olympic – they were reduced in size to make the reception room larger and they eliminated the communicating corridor between the two sides in order to enlarge the elevator foyers. The Olympic vestibules contained Third-Class staircases that led down to E-Deck, which were eliminated on Titanic, and the elaborate wrought-iron grilles which covered the gangway doors were unique to Titanic.

It was reported that during the sinking 2nd Officer Lightoller ordered crew members to open the port side gangway doors on D-Deck for loading more passengers into the lifeboats nearer to sea level. The 1986 expedition confirmed that one of the port-side doors was wide open and the inner doors pulled back. This would have significantly increased the Titanic's flooding if the crew neglected to close doors.

==== Condition in wreck ====
Since its first exploration by James Cameron in 1995, the reception room has become one of the best-documented rooms inside the wreck of the Titanic. It is accessed fairly easily via ROV from the forward stairwell, though there is a deep layer of silt and hanging rusticles which obscure large parts of the room. The Ghosts of the Abyss exploration in 2001 discovered that the Titanic's reception room differed in several minor details from the Olympic: there were more support pillars, the decorative grilles of the elevator entrances were different, and there was a completely unknown wrought iron grill door in the front of the D-Deck gangway entrance. Most of the exquisite leaded-glass windows remain in situ, along with much of the mahogany panelling, built-in plant holders, light fixtures, and carved framework surrounding the steel support pillars of the room. Small amounts of the original white lead paint survive in the carved creases of the woodwork, and several of the swinging doors with their bronze grilles still hang in the entrance vestibule doorways.

=== Promenade and Boat Decks ===
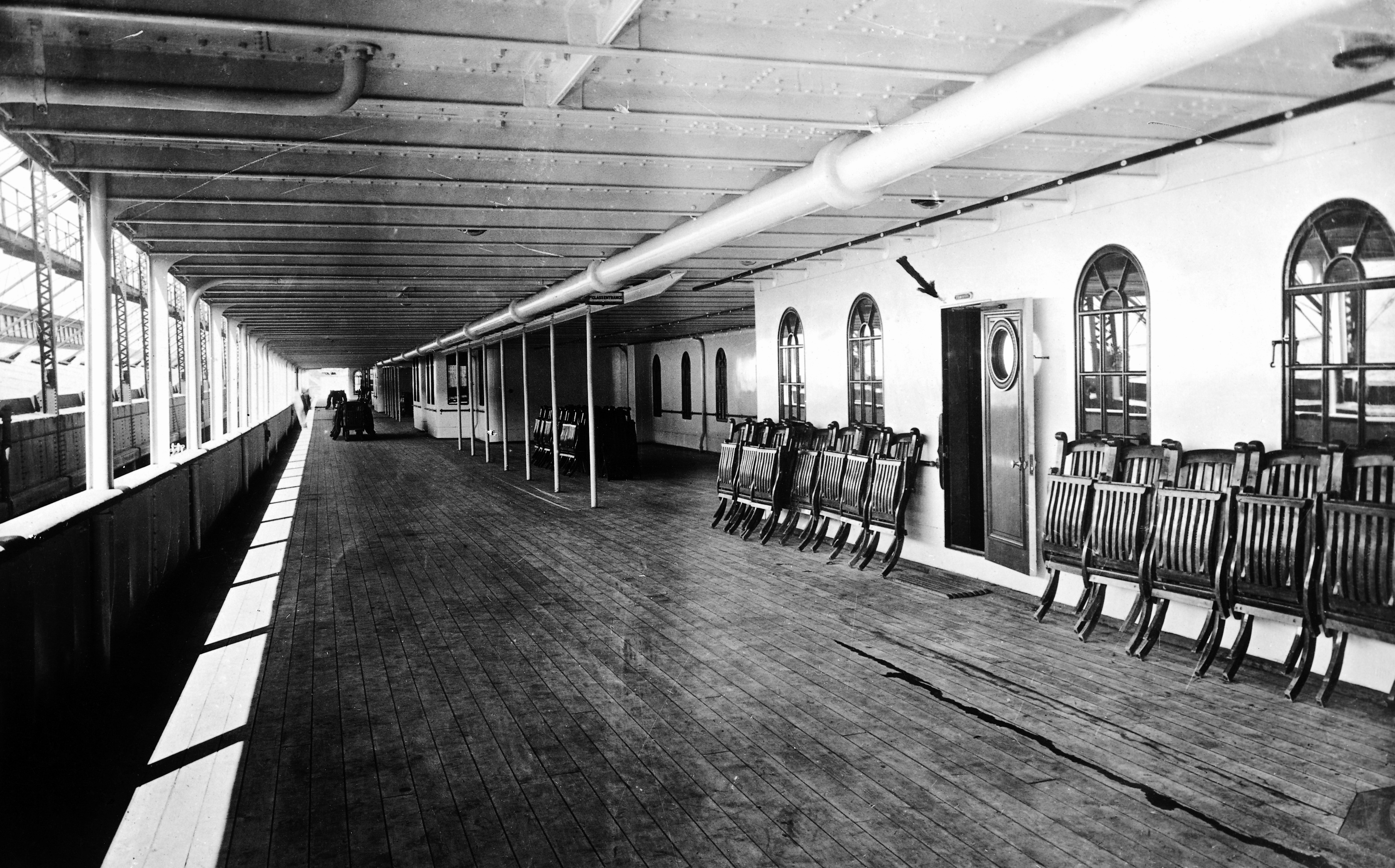
Promenade Deck on the Olympic. The entrance to the aft grand staircase is in the foreground.

The Promenade Deck encircled the whole of A-Deck and together with the middle part of the Boat Deck constituted the outdoor space for first-class passengers to enjoy the sea air and take exercise. Grand first-class public rooms with their large bay windows, like the smoking room and lounge, characterise the aft end of the Promenade. The forward end is distinguished by the stateroom windows which lined the walls along either side, with their heavy bronze frames and etched glass panes. Parts of this deck were as wide as 30 ft. and sheltered alcoves at points along the deck were used to store the dozens of folded teak deckchairs which passengers could rent during the voyage.

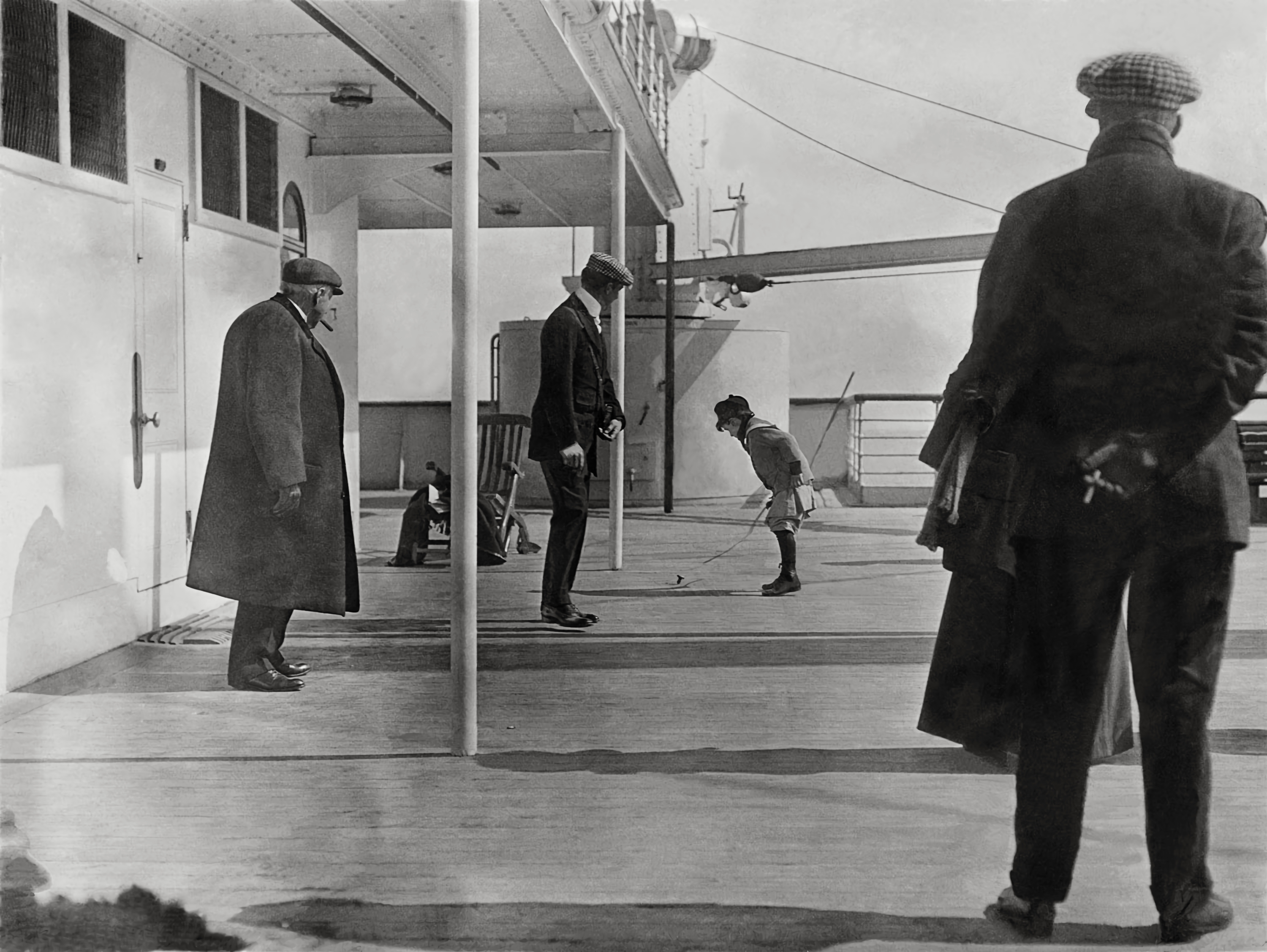
Douglas Spedden playing on the Titanic, April 1912

The aft end of the Promenade was a large open-air space flanked by two large cargo cranes. This part of the deck was installed with wooden slatted wrought iron benches from where passengers could enjoy views of the stern and the sea. Francis Browne took several photos of this area on the Titanic, including a famous one of 6-year-old Douglas Spedden spinning a top with his father. A key distinguishing feature between the Titanic and her sister ship is the Titanic's enclosed forward Promenade Deck, which was installed as protection against the elements and to reinforce a part of the ship prone to heavy vibration. Both had proven to be issues on board the Olympic.

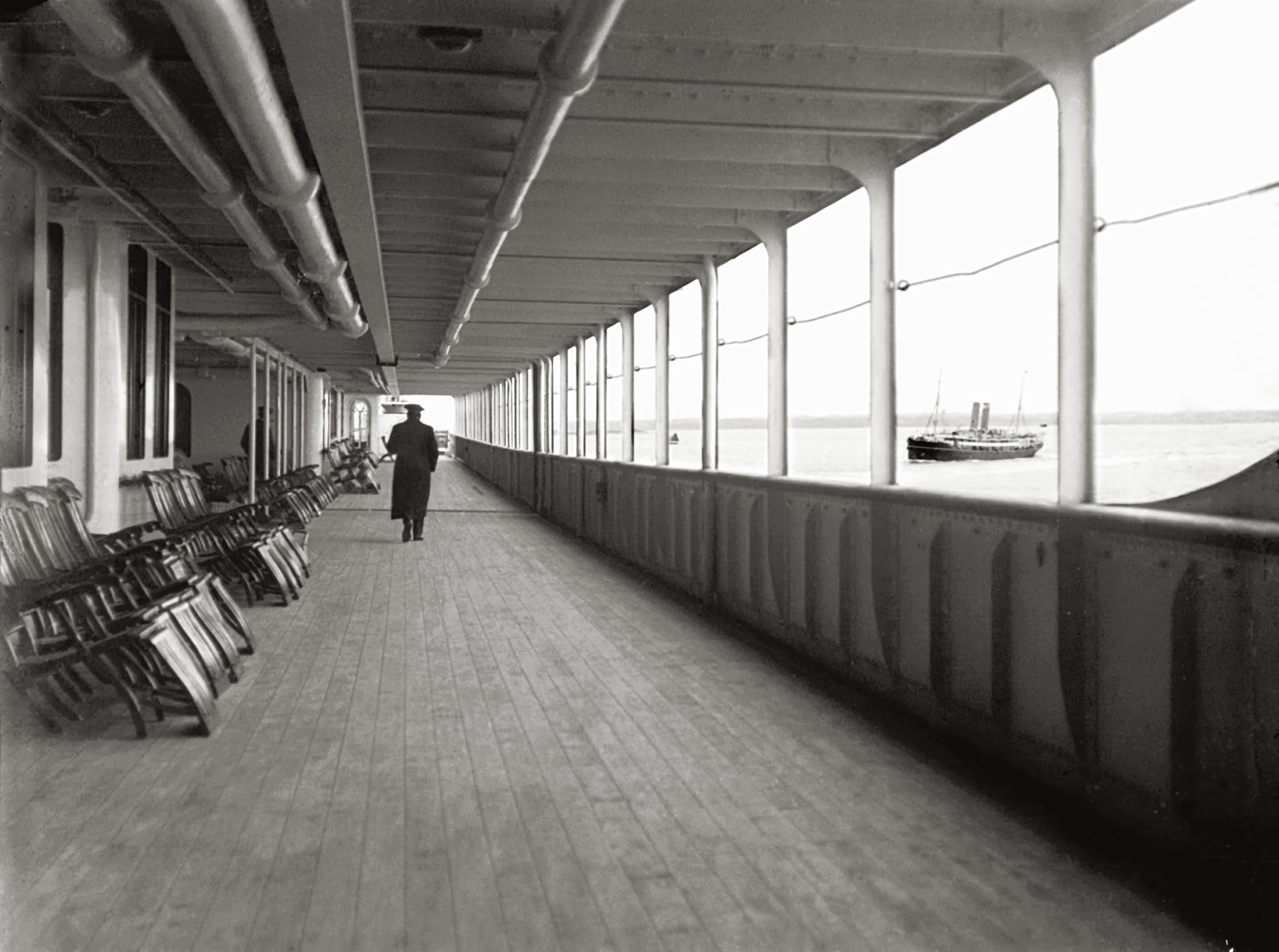
Titanic's Promenade Deck. The windows of the Verandah Café are in the foreground.

Deck chairs and steamer rugs could be rented at the Purser's Office for 4 shillings/1 dollar each, which applied for the entire voyage. Stewards would bring broth and hot drinks for passengers to enjoy if requested. Oftentimes a passenger could spend the entire day relaxing and reading in their deck chair. The Promenade Deck was popular for playing games like shuffleboard, deck quoits, dominoes, and chess, which could be obtained from the Quartermaster. The middle part of the Boat Deck also served as a 200 ft. long open-air promenade for first-class passengers between the officer's promenade at the forward end and the second-class promenade further aft. The gymnasium was located on the starboard side and the raised roof of the lounge, 82 ft. above the waterline, functioned as a large sun deck where deckchairs could be set up. This part of the deck was occupied by only four of the Titanic's 20 lifeboats, which were swung out to the side of the ship at the beginning of the voyage to leave the decks totally uncluttered for the first class.

The deck chairs from Titanic, 614 in all between the first- and second-class areas, have become some of the most recognisable artefacts from the liner. Chief Baker Charles Joughin described throwing dozens overboard from the Promenade Deck during the sinking to be used as flotation devices; passing ships in the weeks after the sinking encountered islands of floating debris including deck chairs. About 10 of Titanic's deck chairs are known today, including one in the Maritime Museum of the Atlantic in Halifax, Nova Scotia and one in the Museum of the City of New York.

=== Grand Staircase ===
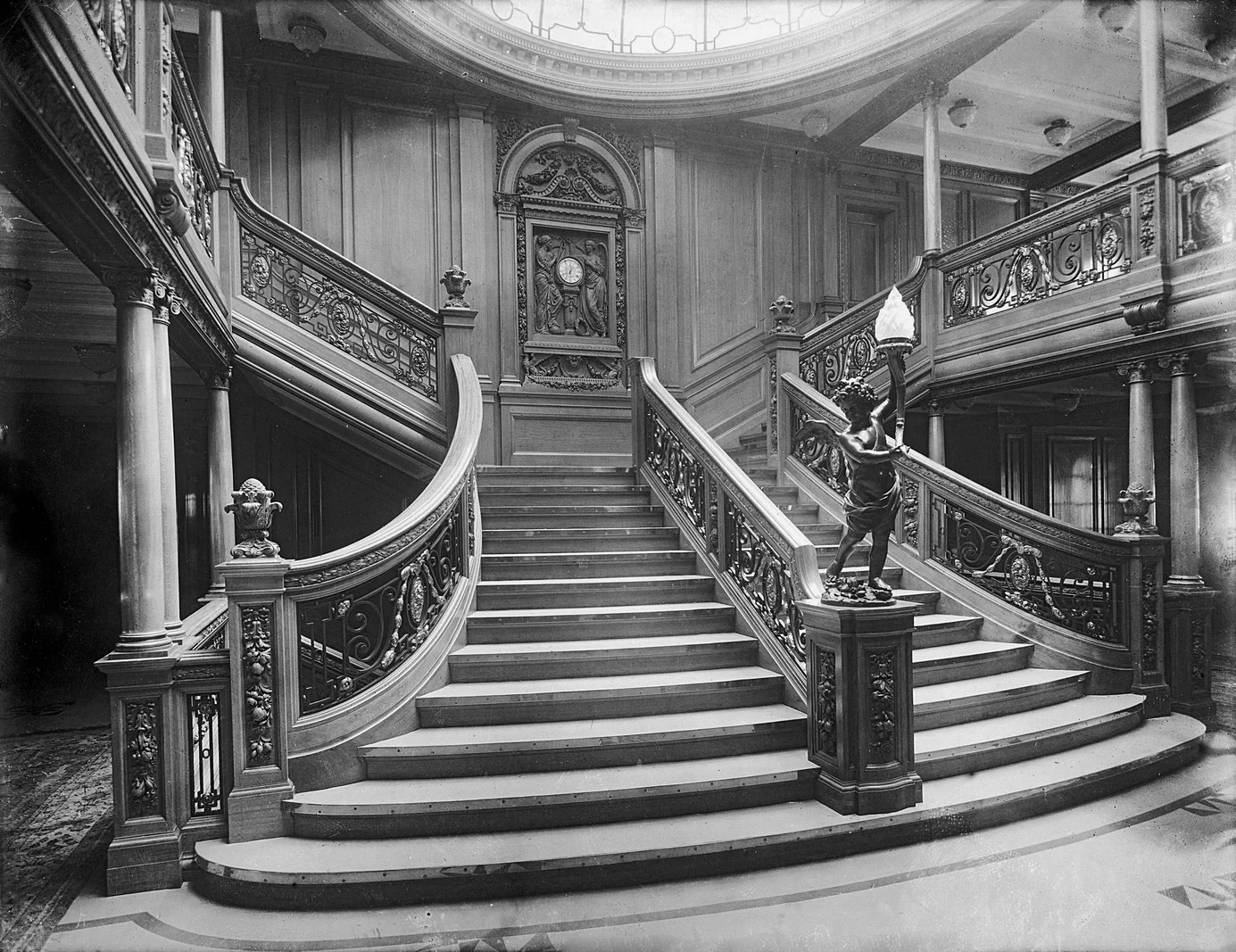
The Grand Staircase on board the Olympic

The Grand Staircase was one of the most impressive features on board the Titanic and the centre of first-class activity. The main stairwell was located in the forward part of the ship and began on the Boat Deck, extending six flights down to E-Deck. B and D Decks contained entry foyers on either side where first-class passengers would embark and disembark, the D-Deck entryway leading directly into the reception room. Each level was constructed in solid English oak with sweeping curves and the surrounding spaces panelled in the sleek neoclassical William and Mary style. The balustrades displayed distinctive wrought iron grilles with ormolu swags in the style of Louis XIV. The A-Deck level was undoubtedly the most spectacular and is the most recognisable due to its frequent depiction in film.

The staircase was crowned by an extravagant wrought iron and glass dome with a large chandelier at the centre. This dome was installed on the roof of the boat deck and provided natural light to the stairwell before being artificially lit at night from behind. On the central landing of the A-Deck staircase was an exquisitely carved clock with allegorical figures on either side, known as Honour and Glory crowning Time. At the foot of the staircase, on the newel post of the middle balustrade, was a bronze cherub holding an electric torch. B and C Decks probably had smaller replicas of these cherubs at either corner of the staircases, and contained landscape oil paintings as the focal points of their landings instead of the unique clock on A-Deck.

From the Grand Staircase a passenger could access almost all of the facilities available in first class, level by level:

- The Boat Deck level gave access to the outside promenade space, sun deck, the lifeboats, and the adjoining Gymnasium. The A-Deck level accessed first-class accommodation at the forward part of the ship and the grand public rooms located further aft via a long corridor. Entry vestibules opened onto the encircling Promenade Deck from the stairway.
- B and C Decks connected to the main corridors containing the bulk of first-class accommodation, including the extravagant 'Millionaire's Suites' located immediately off the B-Deck level staircase. On the Starboard side of the C-Deck staircase was the Purser's Office, where passengers stored their jewellery and other valuable belongings during the voyage.
- On D-Deck the staircase opened directly onto the reception room and adjoining dining saloon. Instead of a cherub, the central post of the staircase contained an impressive gilt candelabra with electric lights. Behind the staircases were installed the three first-class elevators which ran between E and A Decks.
- On E-Deck the staircase narrowed and lost the sweeping curve of the upper flights; a modest single flight terminated on F-Deck, where the Turkish baths and swimming pool could be reached.

=== Aft Grand Staircase ===
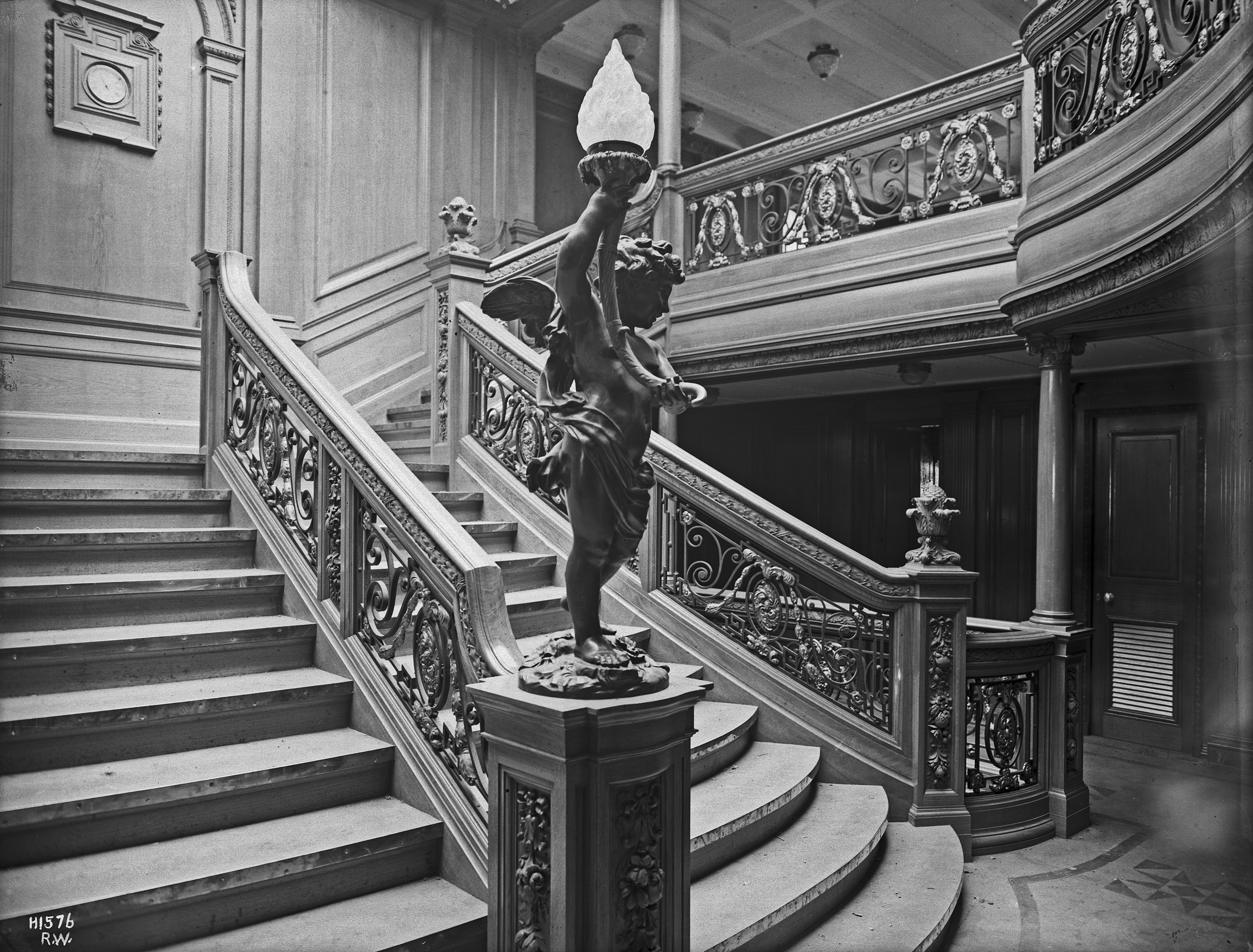
The Olympic Aft Grand Staircase

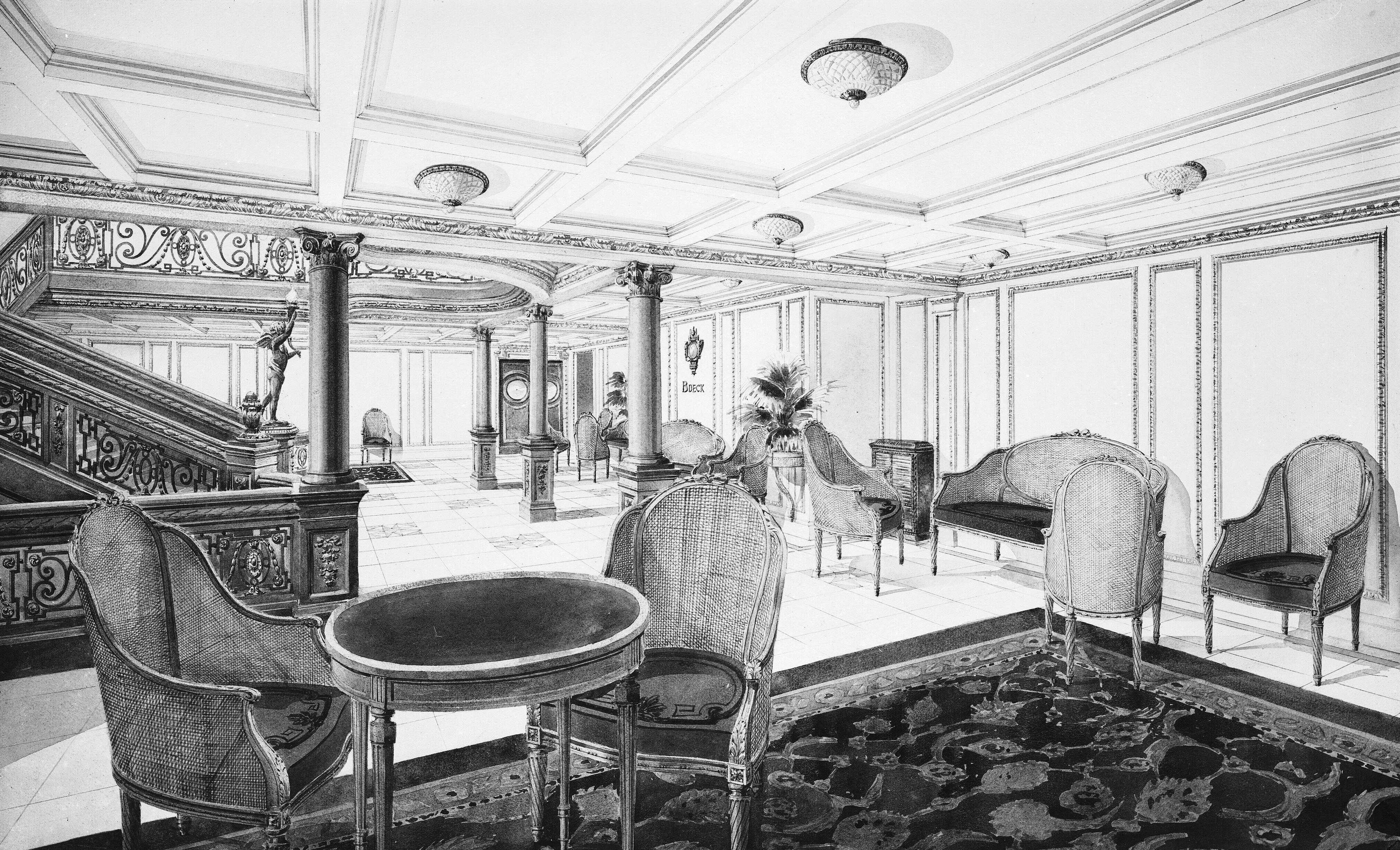
Contemporary illustration of the Titanic's first-class restaurant reception area, located at the B-Deck level of the aft stairway

There was in fact a second staircase located further aft in the ship, between the third and fourth funnels. It was in the same style as the forward stairway with an illuminated dome at the centre, but it was smaller and only installed between A, B, and C Decks. A simple clock graced the main landing in contrast to the ornate "Honour and Glory Crowning Time" clock in the forward staircase. One could access the smoking room immediately off the A-Deck level, and the lounge via a long companionway with revolving doors on the port side. On the Titanic there were two additional stateroom suites installed on either side of the A-Deck staircase, one of which was occupied by Thomas Andrews, the ship's builder.

The whole of the B-Deck foyer was used as a reception area for patrons of the Á La Carte Restaurant and Café Parisien, specially designed in the Georgian style and painted white like the main reception room on D-Deck. There was a recess for coat storage and comfortable rattan seating was arranged in groups throughout the room. This was in contrast to the B-Deck foyer of Olympic, where there was no restaurant reception room and the foyer space was much smaller because of additional cabins and storage rooms.

This staircase was located just aft of where the Titanic broke apart during the sinking and was totally destroyed. It is assumed to be the source of much of the woodwork recovered as wreckage after the sinking.

== See also ==
- Second- and third-class facilities on the Titanic

== Bibliography ==
- Archibald, Rick; Ballard, Robert (2005). The Lost Ships of Robert Ballard. Madison Press Books. ISBN 978-1-59223-424-0.
- Beveridge, Bruce (2009). The Ship Magnificent, Volume Two: Interior Design & Fitting. The History Press. ISBN 978-0-7524-4626-4.
- Chirnside, Mark (2004). The Olympic-class ships : " Olympic ", " Titanic ", " Britannic ". Tempus. ISBN 0-7524-2868-3.
- Lynch, Don; Marschall, Ken (2003). Ghosts of the Abyss. Madison Press Books. ISBN 0-306-81223-1.
- Lynch, Don; Marschall, Ken (1997). Titanic: An Illustrated History. Wellfleet press. ISBN 978-0-7858-1972-1.
- Marschall, Ken (2001). James Cameron's Titanic Expedition: What We Saw on and Inside the Wreck. marconigraph.com.
- O'Donnel, E. E. (1998). L'Album " Titanic " du Révérend Père Browne. MDV. ISBN 2-910821-19-6.
- Masson, Philippe (1998). Le Drame du " Titanic ". Tallendier. ISBN 2-235-02176-X.
- Piouffre, Gérard (2009). Le " Titanic " ne répond plus. Tallendier. ISBN 978-2-03-584196-4.
- Tibballs, Geoff (1997). The Titanic: The Extraordinary Story of the Unsinkable Ship. Carlton Books Ltd. ISBN 0-89577-990-0.
- Wels, Susan (1997). Titanic: Legacy of the World's Greatest Ocean Liner. Time Life Books. ISBN 0-7835-5261-0.
