= Electric bath =

Type of tanning bed

Artists Rendition of the Electric Bath as a tanning bed based on photos from a catalogue.

The electric bath was an early form of tanning bed in the form of a cabinet in which ultraviolet light is applied to the user via lamps. This was featured in numerous light care institutes. It was produced by the German firm Heraeus.

The electric bath consisted of a wooden stand which contained an electrical power supply. Above the wooden stand was a green sheet-metal cabinet lid which contained many ultraviolet lamps, and four additional lamps which could be set into the lid and hooked in with metallic clamps. The additional lamps were placed on either side of the bath lid, as well as at the end to provide the user with extra tanning around the arm and feet areas.

Users would open the lid, recline on a metallic surface placed upon the wooden stand, and close the lid. Often, a bath attendant would set the timer on the bath to a specific time, and the lamps would light up, sending waves of ultraviolet rays at the user's skin, creating a tan.

The early models are now considered dangerous, but conditions such as skin cancer were never known to be caused by the ultraviolet rays conducted by the lamps during the time period they were featured and used in the device. Care had to be taken that the device was used in moderation. Many users survived and enjoyed the experience, although many mention having been burnt, most probably caused by exceeding the recommended 30-minute time limit.

The bath was also featured in the game Titanic: Adventure Out of Time by Cyberflix. In the game, the bath was depicted as a Turkish steam bath for therapeutic and recreational use rather than as a tanning bed. The bath is sabotaged by another character and electrocutes the user inside.
