= Action of 22 September 1914 =

German U-boat ambush of British cruisers

- Part of the First World War
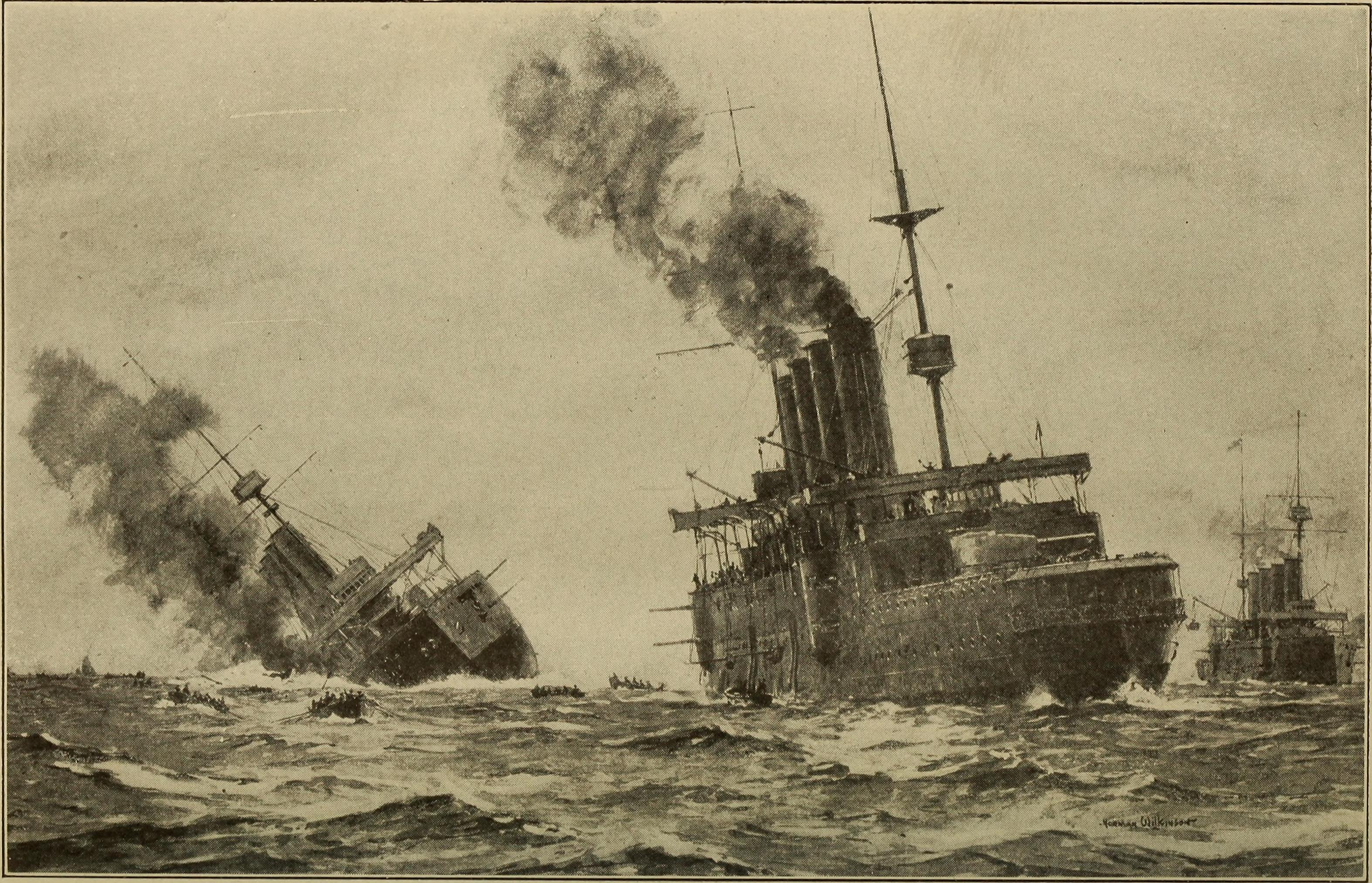
- Artist's illustration of the sinking of HMS Aboukir
Date	22 September 1914
Location	Broad Fourteens, North Sea 53°N 3.75°E
Result	German victory

Belligerents
Germany	United Kingdom

Commanders and leaders
Otto Weddigen	John Drummond; Wilmot Nicholson; Robert Johnson †

Strength
Submarine U-9	3 armoured cruisers

Casualties and losses
Nil	1,459 killed; 3 armoured cruisers sunk
- Location of the action

The Action of 22 September 1914 was an attack by the German U-boat U-9 that took place during the First World War. Three obsolete Royal Navy cruisers of the 7th Cruiser Squadron manned mainly by Royal Naval Reserve part-timers and sometimes referred to as the Live Bait Squadron, were sunk by U-9 while patrolling the southern North Sea.

Neutral ships and trawlers nearby began to rescue survivors but 1,459 British sailors were killed. There was a public outcry in Britain at the losses; the sinkings eroded confidence in the British government and damaged the reputation of the Royal Navy, when many countries were still unsure about taking sides in the war.

== Background ==
The cruisers were part of the Southern Force (Rear-Admiral Arthur Christian) composed of the flagship Euryalus, the light cruiser Amethyst and the 7th Cruiser Squadron (7th CS, also known as Cruiser Squadron C, Rear-Admiral H. H. Campbell, nicknamed the live-bait squadron) comprising the Cressy-class armoured cruisers HMS Bacchante, Aboukir, Hogue, Cressy and Euryalus, the 1st and 3rd Destroyer flotillas, ten submarines of the 8th Oversea Flotilla and the attached Active-class scout cruiser, Fearless. The force patrolled the North Sea, supporting destroyers and submarines of the Harwich Force guarding against incursions by the Kaiserliche Marine (Imperial German Navy) into the English Channel.

Though all three ships were less than 15 years old, warship design had incorporated many changes since, like oil fuel and turbine engines. Concerns had been expressed about the vulnerability of the ships against modern German cruisers but the War Orders of 28 July 1914, reflecting pre-war assumptions about attacks by destroyers rather than submarines, remained in force. The ships were to patrol the area "south of the 54th parallel clear of enemy torpedo craft and destroyers" supported by Cruiser Force C during the day. The Harwich Patrol guarded the Dogger Bank and the Broad Fourteens further south; usually cruisers were to the north, closer to the Dogger Bank and sailed south at night. The cruisers moved to the Broad Fourteens to reinforce the fourth cruiser during troop movements from Britain to France. Heading south put the ships closer to German bases and more vulnerable to submarine attack.

== Prelude ==
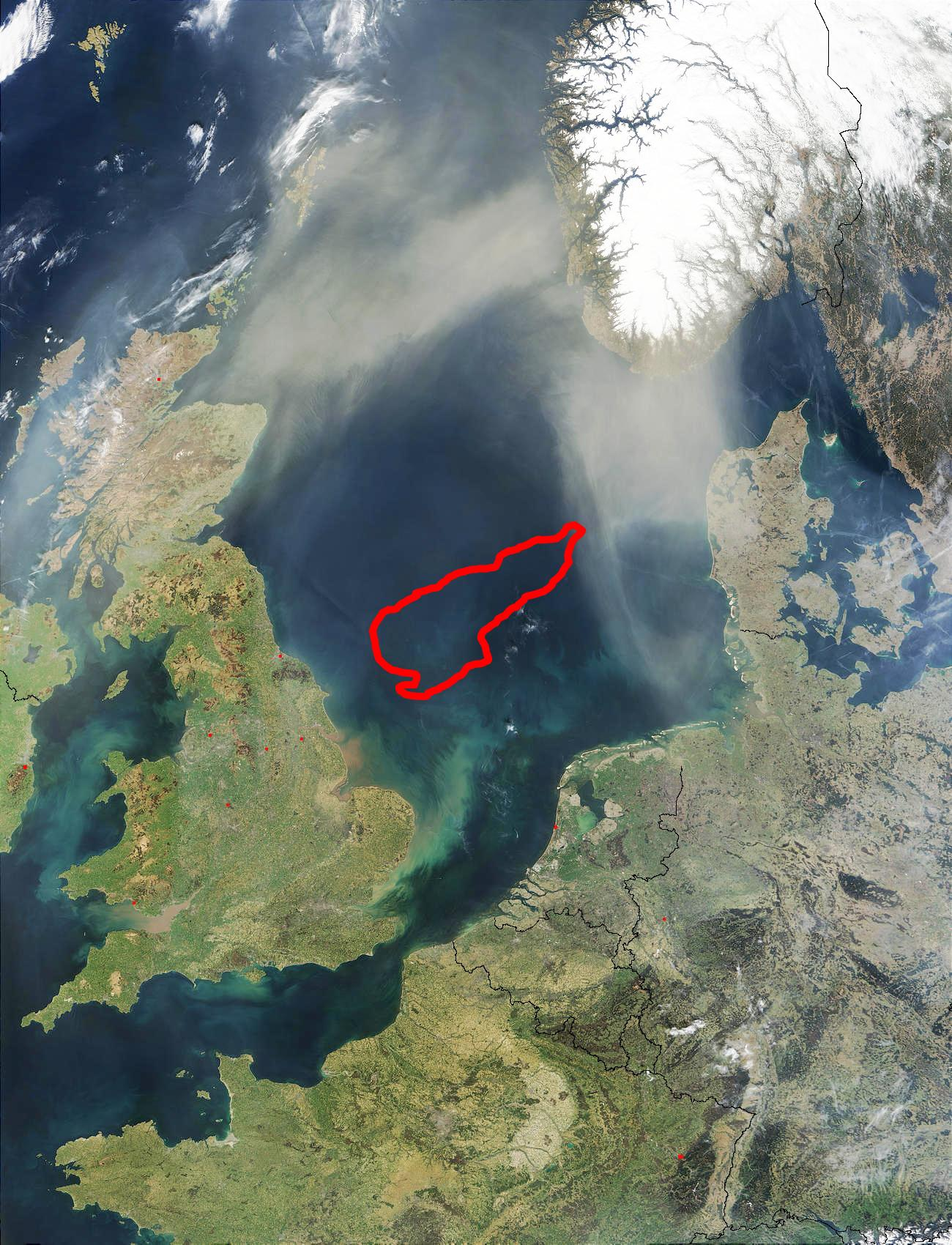
Photograph showing the Dogger Bank (in red) and the southern North Sea

On 16 September, Christian had been allowed to keep two cruisers to the north and one at the Broad Fourteens but had kept them together in a central position, able to support operations in both areas. The next day, the destroyer escorts were forced to depart by heavy weather, which remained so bad that neither patrol could be reformed. The Admiralty ordered that the ships were to cancel the Dogger Patrol and cover the Broad Fourteens until the weather abated. On 20 September, Euryalus returned to port to re-coal and by 22 September, Aboukir, Hogue and Cressy were on patrol under the command of Captain J. E. Drummond of Aboukir. The U-boat was treated lightly by the Imperial German Navy; in the first six weeks of the war, the U-boat arm had sent out ten boats, sunk no ships and lost two boats for their efforts. On the morning of 22 September, Kapitänleutnant Otto Weddigen, the commander of U-9 spotted Aboukir, Hogue and Cressy.

== Action ==
At 06:00 on 22 September, the weather had calmed and the ships were patrolling at 10 kn (12 mph; 19 km/h), in line abreast, 2 nmi (2.3 mi; 3.7 km) apart. Lookouts were posted for submarine periscopes or ships and one gun on each side of each ship was manned. U-9 had been ordered to attack British transports at Ostend but was forced to dive and shelter from the storm. On surfacing, Johannes Spieß, Weddigen's second-in-command had the watch and was the first to spot one of the ships in the far horizon. He immediately alerted Weddigen who ordered his crew to submerge. At 06:20, U-9 fired a torpedo at the middle ship from a range of 550 yd (500 m) and struck Aboukir on the starboard side, flooding the engine room and causing the ship to stop immediately. No submarines had been sighted and Drummond, assuming that the ship had hit a mine, ordered the other two cruisers to close in to help. Aboukir capsized after 25 minutes and sank five minutes later. Only one lifeboat could be launched because of damage from the explosion and the failure of steam-powered winches needed to launch the others.

Diagram of the action of 22 September 1914

U-9, which had dived after firing the torpedo, rose to periscope depth and Weddigen saw the other two cruisers rescuing men from Aboukir. Weddigen fired two torpedoes at Hogue, from 300 yd (270 m). As the torpedoes were fired, the bows of U-9 rose out of the water and she was spotted by Hogue, whose gunners opened fire before the submarine dived. The two torpedoes struck Hogue and within five minutes, Captain Wilmot Nicholson gave the order to abandon ship. Hogue capsized after ten minutes and sank at 07:15. Watchers on Cressy had seen the submarine, opened fire and made an abortive attempt to ram before turning to pick up survivors. At 07:20, U-9 fired two torpedoes at Cressy from her stern torpedo tubes at a range of 1,000 yd (910 m). One torpedo missed and the submarine turned to fire her remaining bow torpedo at 550 yd (500 m). A torpedo struck Cressy on the starboard side at around 07:25 and a second hit the port beam at 07:30. The ship capsized to starboard and floated upside down until 07:55.

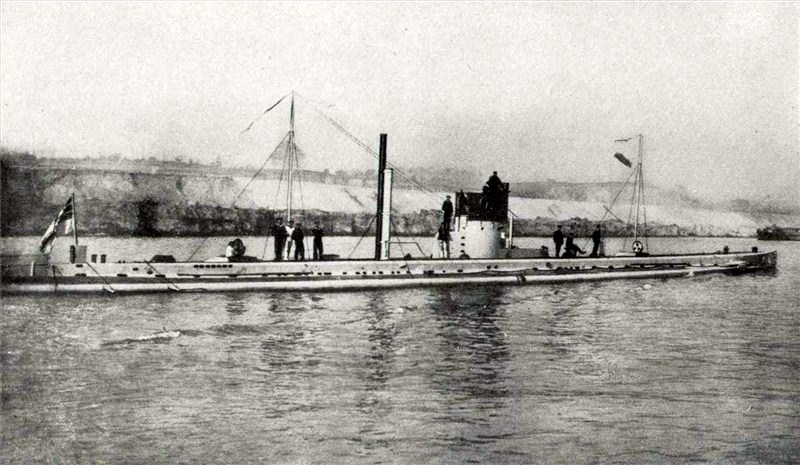
The German submarine U-9

Two Dutch sailing trawlers in the vicinity declined to close with Cressy for fear of mines. (Note: G. H. Collier, the Chaplain on Cressy wrote later that one of the trawlers was fired on by the after 9.2-inch gun, which hit it in the stern and set the trawler on fire.) Distress calls had been received by Tyrwhitt, who, with the destroyer squadron, was already at sea returning to the cruisers now that the weather had improved. At 08:30, the Dutch steamship Flora approached the scene and rescued 286 men. Another steamer, Titan, picked up 147 men. More were rescued by the Lowestoft sailing trawlers, Coriander and J.G.C., before the destroyers arrived at 10:45. A total of 837 men were rescued but 62 officers and 1,397 men, many of them reservists, were killed. The dead included Robert Johnson, the captain of Cressy. The destroyers hunted the submarine, which had little electrical power remaining to travel underwater and could only make 14 kn (16 mph; 26 km/h) on the surface. The submarine submerged for the night and returned to base the next day.

== Aftermath ==
The disaster shook public confidence in Britain and the world in the Royal Navy. Other cruisers were withdrawn from patrol duties; Christian was reprimanded and Drummond was criticized by the Court of Inquiry for failing to take the anti-submarine precautions recommended by the Admiralty but praised for his conduct during the attack. The 28 officers and 258 men rescued by Flora were landed at IJmuiden and were repatriated on 26 September.

Wenman "Kit" Wykeham-Musgrave (1899–1989) survived being torpedoed on all three ships. His daughter recalled

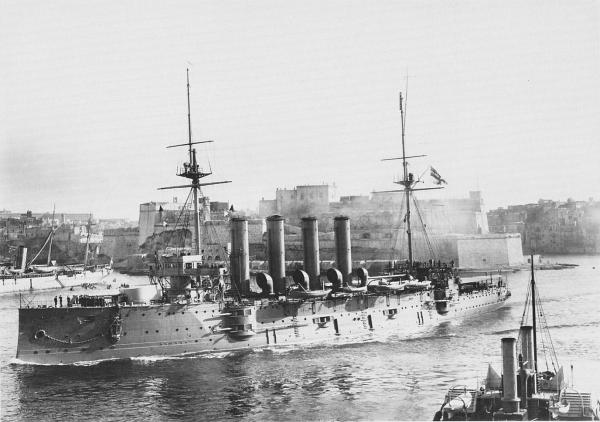
HMS Aboukir

He went overboard when the Aboukir was going down and he swam like mad to get away from the suction. He was then just getting on board the Hogue and she was torpedoed. He then went and swam to the Cressy and she was also torpedoed. He eventually found a bit of driftwood, became unconscious and was eventually picked up by a Dutch trawler.

— Pru Bailey-Hamilton

Weddigen and his crew returned to a heroes' welcome; Weddigen was awarded the Iron Cross, 1st Class and his crew each received the Iron Cross, 2nd Class. The sinking of the three ships caused the danger of U-boat attack to be taken more seriously by the Admiralty.

Commander Dudley Pound, serving in the Grand Fleet as a commander aboard the battleship St. Vincent (who became First Sea Lord) wrote in his diary on 24 September,

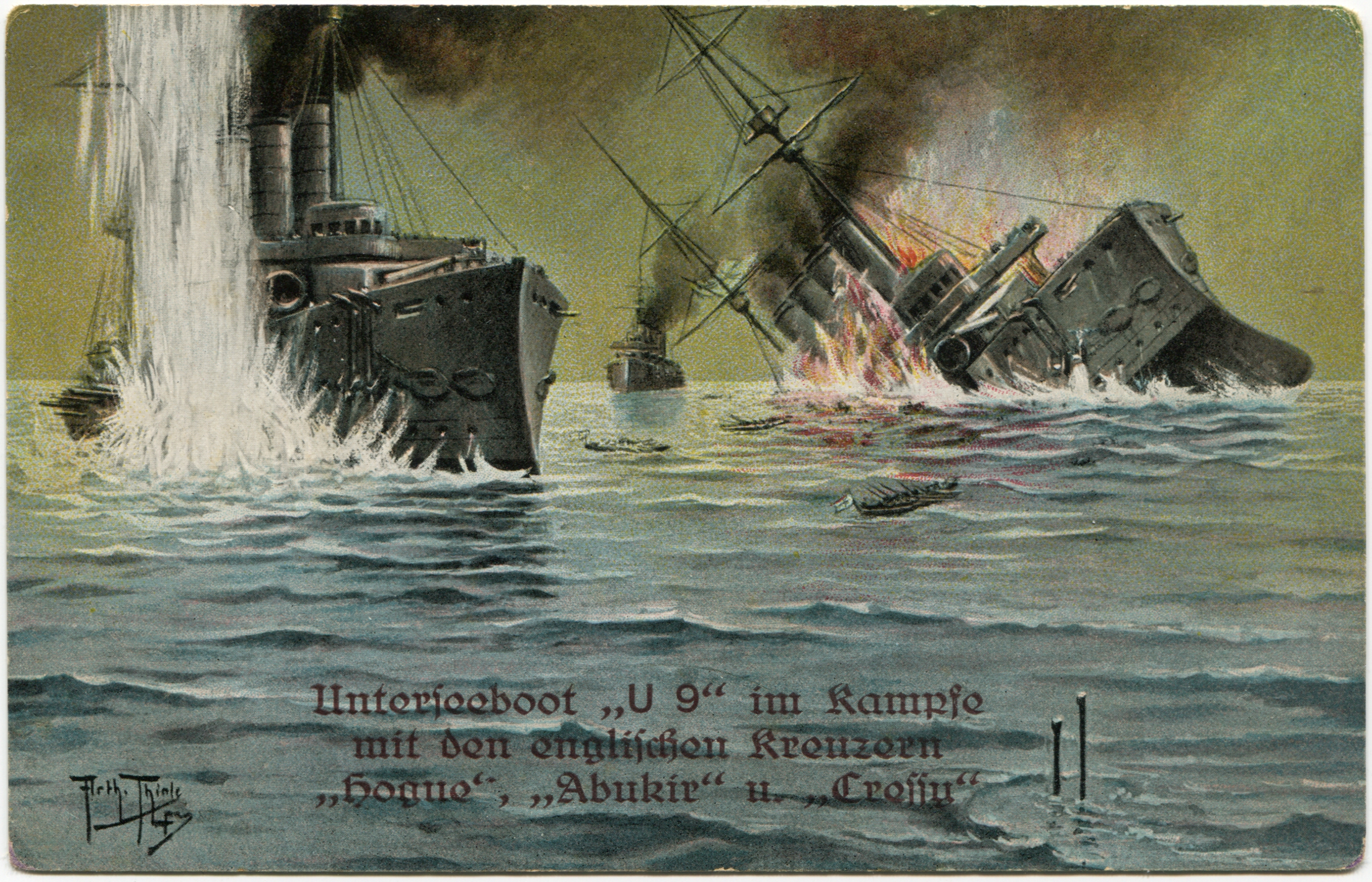
Arthur Thiele, "U-9 attacking the English cruisers HMS Hogue, Aboukir and Cressy"

Much as one regrets the loss of life one cannot help thinking that it is a useful warning to us — we had almost begun to consider the German submarines as no good and our awakening which had to come sooner or later and it might have been accompanied by the loss of some of our Battle Fleet.

— Pound

In 1954, the British government sold the salvage rights to the ships and work began in 2011.

== Order of battle ==
=== Royal Navy ===
Part of the 7th Cruiser Squadron
Name	Flag	Type	Notes
HMS Aboukir	Royal Navy	Cressy-class cruiser	Flagship, Sunk by U-9
HMS Cressy	Royal Navy	Cressy-class cruiser	Sunk by U-9
HMS Hogue	Royal Navy	Cressy-class cruiser	Sunk by U-9

=== Kaiserliche Marine ===
German submarine
Name	Flag	Type	Notes
U-9	Imperial German Navy	Type U 9	Sank HMS Aboukir, Cressy and Hogue
