= HMS Euryalus (1901) =

British Cressy-class armoured cruiser

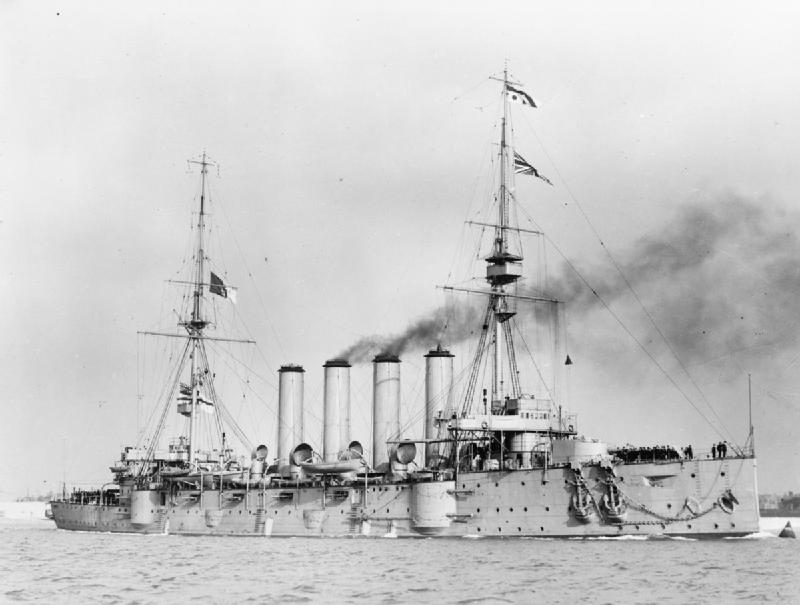
- HMS Euryalus

History

United Kingdom
- Name: HMS Euryalus
- Namesake: Euryalus
- Ordered: 1897-98 Programme
- Builder: Vickers, Sons & Maxim
- Laid down: 18 July 1899
- Launched: 20 May 1901
- Sponsored by: Mrs. Douglas Vickers
- Completed: 5 January 1904
- In service: 1904-1920
- Out of service: 1919
- Reclassified: As minelayer, 1918
- Fate: Sold for scrap, 1 July 1920

General characteristics
- Class & type: Cressy-class armoured cruiser
- Displacement: 12,000 long tons (12,000 t) (normal)
- Length: 472 ft (143.9 m) (o/a)
- Beam: 69 ft 6 in (21.2 m)
- Draught: 26 ft 9 in (8.2 m) (maximum)
- Installed power: 21,000 ihp (16,000 kW); 30 Belleville boilers
- Propulsion: 2 × shafts; 2 × 4-cylinder triple-expansion steam engines
- Speed: 21 knots (39 km/h; 24 mph)
- Complement: 725–760
- Armament: 2 × single BL 9.2-inch Mk X guns; 12 × single BL 6-inch Mk VII guns; 12 × single QF 12-pdr 12 cwt guns (Note: "Cwt" is the abbreviation for hundredweight, 12 cwt referring to the weight of the gun.); 3 × QF 3-pounder Hotchkiss guns; 2 × single submerged 18-inch torpedo tubes
- Armour: Belt: 2–6 in (51–152 mm); Decks: 1–3 in (25–76 mm); Barbettes: 6 in (152 mm); Turrets: 6 in (150 mm); Conning tower: 12 in (305 mm); Bulkheads: 5 in (127 mm)

HMS Euryalus was a Cressy-class armoured cruiser built for the Royal Navy around 1900. Badly damaged by multiple accidents while fitting out, she was not completed until 1904. She became flagship of the Australia Station that year and was reduced to reserve upon her return in 1905. Recommissioned in 1906, she became a training ship for the North America and West Indies Station before being placed in reserve with the Third Fleet in 1909.

Recommissioned at the start of World War I, Euryalus was assigned to the 7th Cruiser Squadron. She became flagship of the Southern Force defending the eastern end of the English Channel from any German attack, shortly after the war began. She was present at the Battle of Heligoland Bight a few weeks after the war began, but saw no combat. She was transferred to convoy escort duties in the Bay of Biscay in late 1914, before being sent to Egypt in early 1915. Euryalus was then assigned to support British troops during the Gallipoli Campaign by providing naval gunfire. She covered the landing at Cape Helles in April as well as providing fire support during one subsequent British offensive. She became the flagship of the East Indies Station in January 1916, until relieved in July 1917. Later that year she began a conversion into a minelayer at Hong Kong, but this was still incomplete when the war ended. Euryalus returned home in 1919 and was sold for scrap the following year.

== Design and description ==
Euryalus was designed to displace 12,000 long tons (12,193 t). The ship had an overall length of 472 feet (143.9 m), a beam of 69 feet 9 inches (21.3 m) and a deep draught of 26 feet 9 inches (8.2 m). She was powered by two 4-cylinder triple-expansion steam engines, each driving one shaft, which produced a total of 21,000 indicated horsepower (15,660 kW) and gave a maximum speed of 21 knots (39 km/h; 24 mph). The engines were powered by 30 Belleville boilers. On their sea trials all of the Cressy-class cruisers, except the lead ship, exceeded their designed speed. She carried a maximum of 1,600 long tons (1,626 t) of coal and her complement ranged from 725 to 760 officers and ratings.

Her main armament consisted of two breech-loading (BL) 9.2-inch (234 mm) Mk X guns in single gun turrets, one each fore and aft of the superstructure. They fired 380-pound (170 kg) shells to a range of 15,500 yards (14,200 m). Her secondary armament of twelve BL 6-inch Mk VII guns was arranged in casemates amidships. Eight of these were mounted on the main deck and were only usable in calm weather. They had a maximum range of approximately 12,200 yards (11,200 m) with their 100-pound (45 kg) shells. A dozen quick-firing (QF) 12-pounder 12 cwt guns were fitted for defence against torpedo boats, eight on casemates on the upper deck and four in the superstructure. Euryalus also carried three 3-pounder Hotchkiss guns and two submerged 18-inch torpedo tubes.

The ship's waterline armour belt had a maximum thickness of 6 inches (152 mm) and was closed off by 5-inch (127 mm) transverse bulkheads. The armour of the gun turrets and their barbettes was 6 inches thick while the casemate armour was 5 inches thick. The protective deck armour ranged in thickness from 1–3 inches (25–76 mm) and the conning tower was protected by 12 inches (305 mm) of armour.

== Construction and service ==
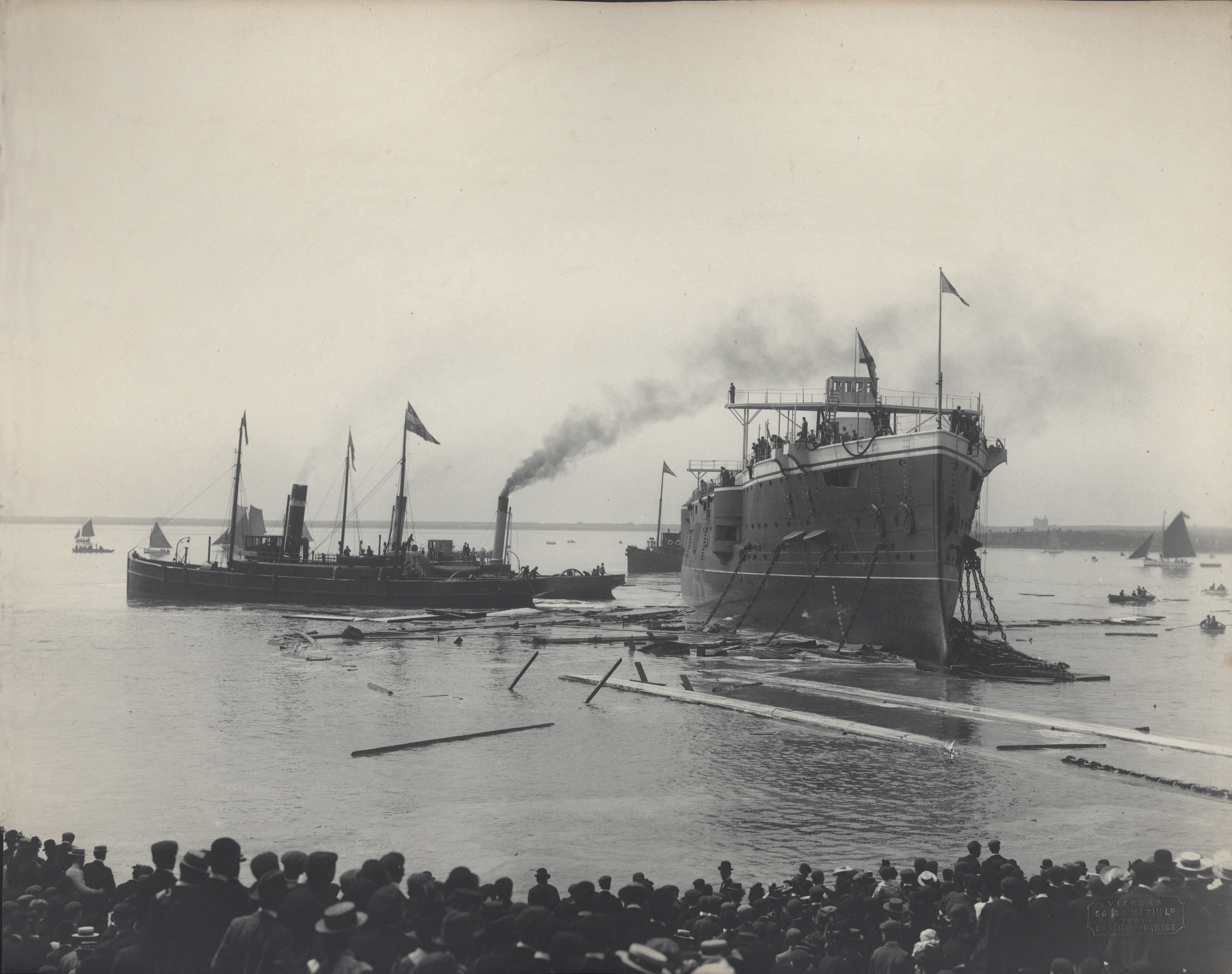
Launching of HMS Euryalus

Euryalus, named after the Greek hero Euryalus, was laid down on 18 July 1899 by Vickers, Sons & Maxim at their Barrow-in-Furness shipyard. She was launched 20 May 1901 in front of 30,000 spectators, and christened by Mrs. Douglas Vickers, wife of one of the directors of the company. On 11 June 1901, the south side of the Ramsden dock at Barrow caught fire, and was practically destroyed before the flames could be extinguished. The recently launched Euryalus was laying alongside this wharf, and the fire set ablaze the teak wood sheathing of the cruiser. Considerable damage was done to the ship before she was hauled from the pier into the middle of the dock, and her completion was severely delayed. Towed to Cammell Laird at Birkenhead for repairs, the ship slipped off the blocks supporting her in drydock and was severely damaged. While on sea trials on 27 June 1903, she collided in the Hamoaze, Devonport with the fleet tug HMS Traveller, which sank. Euryalus was finally completed on 5 January 1904, nearly two years after her sister ships.

Upon commissioning she became flagship of the Australia Station before returning home in 1905. Reduced to reserve upon her arrival, she was sent to the North America and West Indies Station in 1906, where she served as a boys' training ship attached to the 4th Cruiser Squadron for the next three years. Euryalus was assigned to the reserve Third Fleet when she returned home in 1909. At the outbreak of the war in August 1914, she was assigned to the 7th Cruiser Squadron, tasked with patrolling the Broad Fourteens of the North Sea in support of a force of destroyers and submarines based at Harwich, which protected the eastern end of the English Channel from German warships attempting to attack the supply route between England and France. On 10 August, she became the flagship of Rear-Admiral Arthur Christian, commander of the Southern Force, formed to command all of the forces defending the eastern end of the Channel. During the Battle of Heligoland Bight on 28 August, the ship was in reserve off the Dutch coast, and saw no action.

On 20 September 1914, Euryalus and her sisters Aboukir, Cressy and Hogue were on patrol in the Broad Fourteen. Euryalus had to return to port that morning to recoal. Two days later the three remaining cruisers were sunk by the SM U-9 and Christian was subsequently relieved of his command. As a result of these losses, she, and her sister Bacchante, were transferred to the 12th Cruiser Squadron to escort ships between England and Gibraltar in early October.

Euryalus and Bacchante were transferred to Egypt in late January 1915 to reinforce the defences of the Suez Canal, although the Turkish raid on the Suez Canal had already been repulsed by the time that they arrived in February. Upon arrival Rear-Admiral Richard Peirse, commander of the East Indies Station, hoisted his flag in Euryalus. By this time the preliminary bombardments of the Turkish defences of the Dardanelles had already occurred, and the sisters were transferred north in March as the Turks east of the Canal proved to be reasonably quiet.

Euryalus became the flagship of Rear Admiral Rosslyn Wemyss in April, after he was put in charge of the main landings at Gallipoli. During the landings at Cape Helles on the morning of 25 April, Euryalus transported three companies of the 1st Battalion of the Lancashire Fusiliers and a platoon of the Royal Naval Division, and then provided fire support to the landing after the soldiers were transferred to their boats for the actual landing on Beach 'W'. She also bombarded Turkish positions during the Second Battle of Krithia on 6 May. A month later, Wemyss hauled down his flag and resumed his original commanding of the Allied base at Mudros. Euryalus received a brief refit at Malta from 30 December 1915 to 20 January 1916 before proceeding to Egypt to reinforce the defences there.

On 15 January 1916 Wemyss, the new Commander-in-Chief, East Indies, hoisted his flag aboard Euryalus. From 3 January 1917 through 24 April, she was refitted at Bombay. On 29 June she bombarded the barracks in the Yemeni town of Hodeida together with the troopship RIM Northbrook of the Royal Indian Marine. Rear Admiral Ernest Gaunt relieved Wemyss as commander-in-chief on 20 July 1917 and transferred his flag to Northbrook on 29 August. In early November, the ship dismounted four 6-inch and four 12-pounder guns at Bombay before proceeding to Hong Kong. She was paid off there on 20 December to complete her conversion into a minelayer. This was not finished when the war ended, and she returned to Britain to be laid up at the Nore in April 1919. Euryalus was sold for scrap on 1 July 1920 and broken up in Germany beginning in September 1922.

== Bibliography ==
- Chesneau, Roger & Kolesnik, Eugene M., eds. (1979). Conway's All the World's Fighting Ships 1860–1905. Greenwich: Conway Maritime Press. ISBN 0-8317-0302-4.
- Corbett, Julian. Naval Operations to the Battle of the Falklands. History of the Great War: Based on Official Documents. Vol. I (2nd, reprint of the 1938 ed.). London and Nashville, Tennessee: Imperial War Museum and Battery Press. ISBN 0-89839-256-X.
- Corbett, Julian (1997). Naval Operations. History of the Great War: Based on Official Documents. Vol. II (reprint of the 1929 second ed.). London and Nashville, Tennessee: Imperial War Museum in association with the Battery Press. ISBN 1-870423-74-7.
- Corbett, Julian (1997). Naval Operations. History of the Great War: Based on Official Documents. Vol. III (reprint of the 1940 second ed.). London and Nashville, Tennessee: Imperial War Museum in association with the Battery Press. ISBN 1-870423-50-X.
- Friedman, Norman (2012). British Cruisers of the Victorian Era. Barnsley, South Yorkshire, UK: Seaforth. ISBN 978-1-59114-068-9.
- Friedman, Norman (2011). Naval Weapons of World War One. Barnsley, South Yorkshire, UK: Seaforth. ISBN 978-1-84832-100-7.
- Gardiner, Robert & Gray, Randal, eds. (1985). Conway's All the World's Fighting Ships 1906–1921. Annapolis, Maryland: Naval Institute Press. ISBN 0-85177-245-5.
- Massie, Robert K. (2004). Castles of Steel: Britain, Germany, and the Winning of the Great War at Sea. London: Jonathan Cape. ISBN 0-224-04092-8.
- Osborne, Eric W. (2006). The Battle of Heligoland Bight. Bloomington, Indiana: Indiana University Press. ISBN 0-253-34742-4.
- Silverstone, Paul H. (1984). Directory of the World's Capital Ships. New York: Hippocrene Books. ISBN 0-88254-979-0.
- "Transcript: HMS EURYALUS – November 1915 to December 1917, Aegean, Mediterranean, East Indies Station". Royal Navy Log Books of the World War 1 Era. Naval-History.net.
