= HMS Aboukir (1900) =

British Cressy-class armored cruiser

Coordinates: 53°N 3.75°E

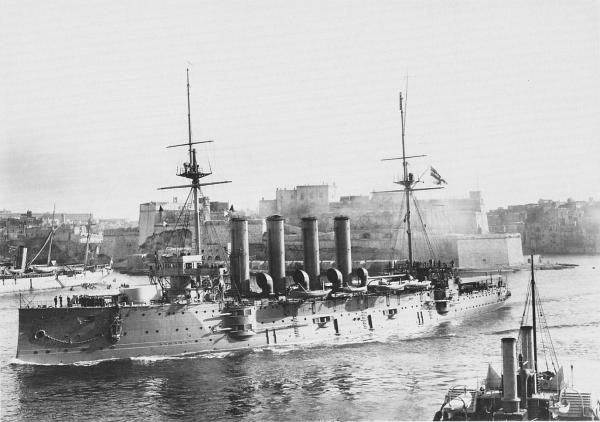
- Aboukir, port side, at Malta

History

United Kingdom
- Name: Aboukir
- Namesake: Battle of Aboukir Bay
- Builder: Fairfield Shipbuilding, Govan
- Laid down: 9 November 1898
- Launched: 16 May 1900
- Completed: early 1902
- Commissioned: 3 April 1902
- Fate: Sunk 22 September 1914

General characteristics
- Class & type: Cressy-class armoured cruiser
- Displacement: 12,000 long tons (12,000 t) (normal)
- Length: 472 ft (143.9 m) (o/a)
- Beam: 69 ft 6 in (21.2 m)
- Draught: 26 ft 9 in (8.2 m) (maximum)
- Installed power: 30 Belleville boilers; 21,000 ihp (16,000 kW)
- Propulsion: 2 × shafts; 2 × triple-expansion steam engines
- Speed: 21 knots (39 km/h; 24 mph)
- Complement: 725–760
- Armament: 2 × single 9.2 in (234 mm) guns; 12 × single 6 in (152 mm) guns; 12 × single 12 pdr (3 in (76 mm)) 12-cwt guns (Note: "Cwt" is the abbreviation for hundredweight, 12 cwt referring to the weight of the gun.); 3 × single 3 pdr (47 mm (1.9 in)) guns; 2 × single submerged 18 in (450 mm) torpedo tubes
- Armour: Belt: 2–6 in (51–152 mm); Decks: 1–3 in (25–76 mm); Barbettes: 6 in; Turrets: 6 in

HMS Aboukir was a Cressy-class armoured cruiser built for the Royal Navy around 1900. Upon completion she was assigned to the Mediterranean Fleet and spent most of her career there. Upon returning home in 1912, she was placed in reserve. Recommissioned at the start of the First World War, she played a minor role in the Battle of Heligoland Bight a few weeks after the beginning of the war. Aboukir was sunk by the German submarine U-9, together with two of her sister ships, on 22 September 1914; 527 men of her complement died.

== Design and description ==
Aboukir was designed to displace 12,000 long tons (12,000 t). The ship had an overall length of 472 feet (143.9 m), a beam of 69 feet 9 inches (21.3 m) and a deep draught of 26 feet 9 inches (8.2 m). She was powered by two 4-cylinder triple-expansion steam engines, each driving one shaft, which produced a total of 21,000 indicated horsepower (16,000 kW) and gave a maximum speed of 21 knots (39 km/h; 24 mph). The engines were powered by 30 Belleville boilers. On their sea trials all of the Cressy-class cruisers, except the lead ship, exceeded their designed speed. She carried a maximum of 1,600 long tons (1,600 t) of coal and her complement ranged from 725 to 760 officers and ratings.

Her main armament consisted of two breech-loading (BL) 9.2-inch (234 mm) Mk X guns in single gun turrets, one each fore and aft of the superstructure. They fired 380-pound (170 kg) shells to a range of 15,500 yards (14,200 m). Her secondary armament of twelve BL 6-inch Mk VII guns was arranged in casemates amidships. Eight of these were mounted on the main deck and were only usable in calm weather. They had a maximum range of approximately 12,200 yards (11,200 m) with their 100-pound (45 kg) shells. A dozen quick-firing (QF) 12-pounder 12 cwt guns were fitted for defence against torpedo boats, eight on casemates on the upper deck and four in the superstructure. The ship also carried three 3-pounder Hotchkiss guns and two submerged 18-inch torpedo tubes.

The ship's waterline armour belt ranged in thickness from 2 to 6 inches (51 to 152 mm) and was closed off by 5-inch (127 mm) transverse bulkheads. The armour of the gun turrets and their barbettes was 6 inches thick while the casemate armour was 5 inches thick. The protective deck armour ranged in thickness from 1–3 inches (25–76 mm) and the conning tower was protected by 12 inches (305 mm) of armour.

== Construction and service ==
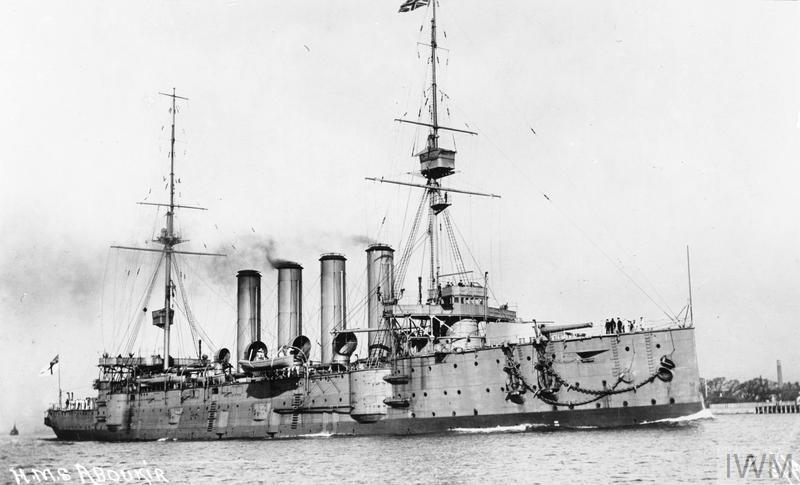
Aboukir, starboard side, at Portsmouth

Aboukir was laid down by Fairfield Shipbuilding & Engineering at their shipyard in Govan, Scotland on 9 November 1898 and launched on 16 May 1900. In March 1901 she arrived at Portsmouth Dockyard for fitting out. She was completed early the following year, and commissioned on 3 April 1902 The ship was assigned to the Mediterranean Fleet upon commissioning, and left Portsmouth in early May, arriving at Malta later that month.

She made two deployments to the Mediterranean, 1902–1905 and 1907–1912. In September 1902 she visited Greek waters for combined maneuvers with other ships of the cruiser and channel divisions, landing at Nauplia and Argostoli, before she escorted the damaged battleship HMS Hood from Malta to Gibraltar in October.

She was reduced to reserve when she returned home in 1912 and was assigned to the 7th Cruiser Squadron shortly after the outbreak of the First World War in August 1914. The squadron was tasked with patrolling the Broad Fourteens of the North Sea in support of a force of destroyers and submarines based at Harwich which protected the eastern end of the English Channel from German warships attempting to attack the supply route between England and France. During the Battle of Heligoland Bight on 28 August, the ship was part of Cruiser Force 'C', in reserve off the Dutch coast, and saw no action.

=== Fate ===
Manoeuvres

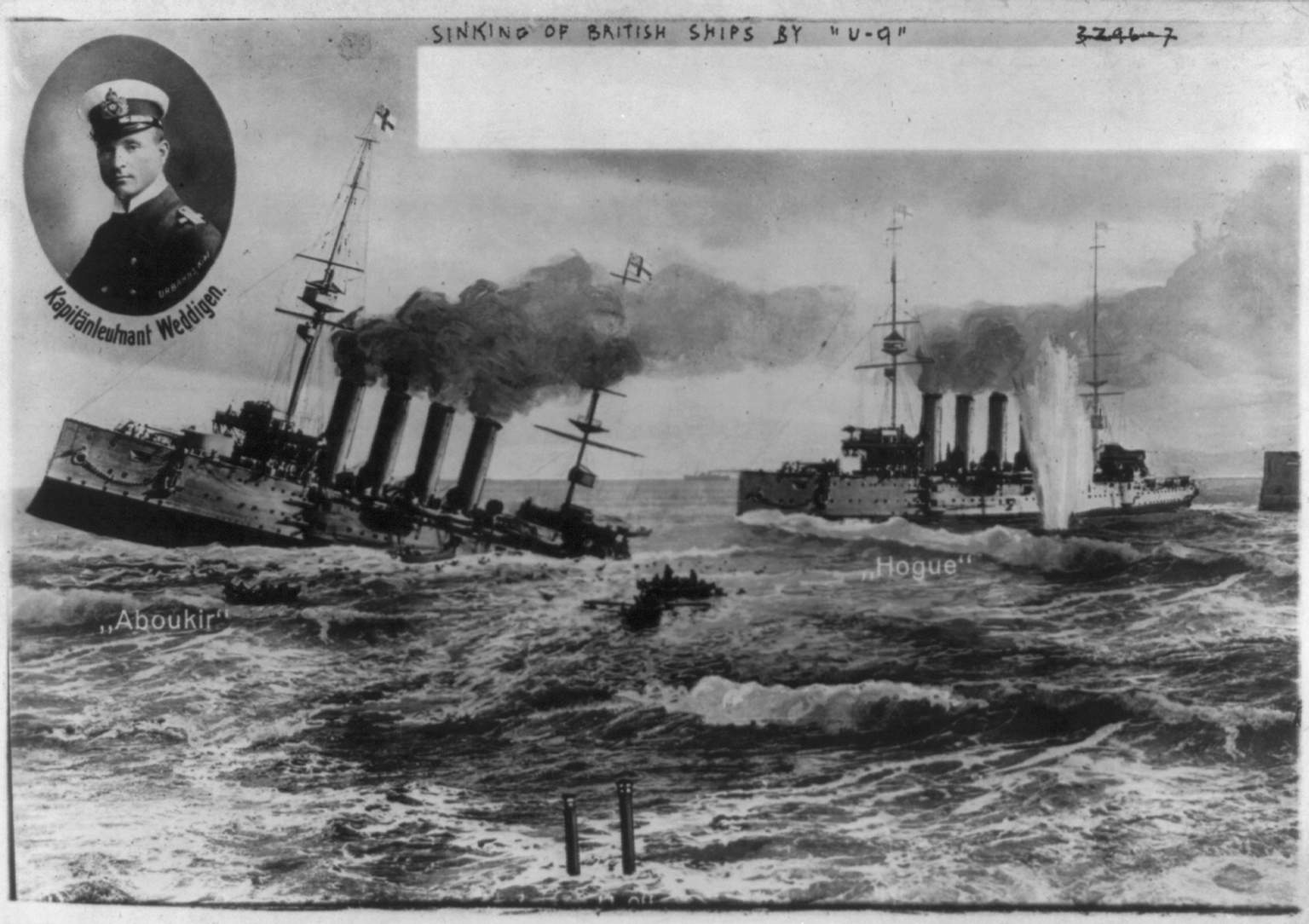
"Victories of U-9" — a contemporary German postcard showing the sinking Aboukir and Hogue with the photo of Weddigen in the corner

On the morning of 22 September, Aboukir and her sisters, Cressy and Hogue, were on patrol without any escorting destroyers as they had been forced to seek shelter from bad weather. The three sisters in line abreast, about 2,000 yards (1,800 m) apart, at a speed of 10 knots (19 km/h; 12 mph). They were not expecting submarine attack, but they had lookouts posted and had one gun manned on each side to attack any submarines sighted. The weather had moderated earlier that morning and Commodore Reginald Tyrwhitt, commander of the Harwich Force, was en route to reinforce the cruisers with eight destroyers.

SM U-9, commanded by Kapitänleutnant Otto Weddigen, had been ordered to attack British transports at Ostend, but had been forced to dive and take shelter from the storm. On surfacing, she spotted the British ships and moved to attack. She fired one torpedo at 06:20 at Aboukir that struck her on the port side; Captain John Drummond thought he had struck a mine and ordered the other two ships to close to transfer his wounded men. Aboukir quickly began listing and capsized around 06:55 despite counterflooding compartments on the opposite side to right her. By the time that Drummond ordered "abandon ship" only one boat was available because the others had either been smashed or could not be lowered as no steam was available to power the winches for the boats.

As Hogue approached her sinking sister, the ship's captain, Wilmot Nicholson, realized that it had been a submarine attack and signalled Cressy to look for a periscope, although his ship continued to close on Aboukir as her crew threw overboard anything that would float to aid the survivors in the water. Having stopped and lowered all her boats, Hogue was struck by two torpedoes around 06:55. The sudden weight loss of the two torpedoes caused U-9 to broach the surface and Hogue's gunners opened fire without effect before the submarine could submerge again. The cruiser capsized about ten minutes after being torpedoed as all of her watertight doors had been open, and she sank at 07:15.

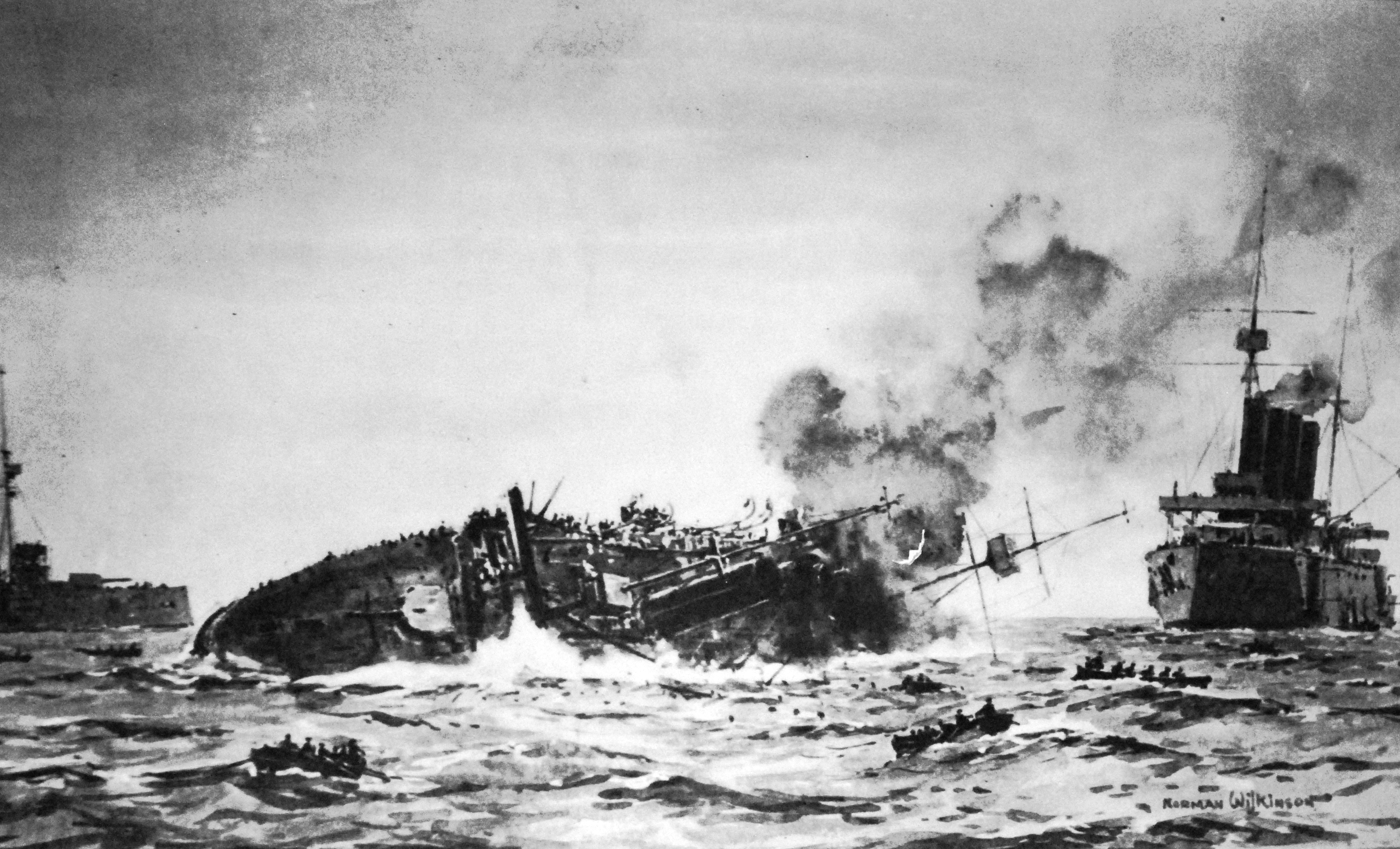
Loss of HMS Aboukir by Norman Wilkinson

Cressy attempted to ram the submarine, but did not hit anything and resumed her rescue efforts until she too was torpedoed at 07:20. She too took on a heavy list and then capsized, before sinking at 07:55. Several Dutch ships began rescuing survivors at 08:30 and were joined by British fishing trawlers before Tyrwhitt and his ships arrived at 10:45. The combined total from all three ships was 837 men rescued and 62 officers and 1,397 ratings lost. Of these, Aboukir lost a total of 527 men.

In 1954 the British government sold the salvage rights to all three ships to a German company and they were subsequently sold again to a Dutch company which began salvaging the wrecks' metal in 2011.

== Bibliography ==
- Chesneau, Roger & Kolesnik, Eugene M., eds. (1979). Conway's All the World's Fighting Ships 1860–1905. Greenwich: Conway Maritime Press. ISBN 0-8317-0302-4.
- Corbett, Julian (1997). Naval Operations: To the Battle of the Falklands. History of the Great War Based on Official Documents by Direction of the Historical Section of the Committee of Imperial Defence. Vol. I (2nd, repr. of the 1938 ed.). London and Nashville, Tennessee: Imperial War Museum Department of Printed Books and Battery Press. ISBN 0-89839-256-X.
- Firme, Tim; Johnson, Harold & MacDonald, Kevin C. (2005). "Question 27/04: British WW I Armored Cruiser Wrecks". Warship International. XLII (3): 242. ISSN 0043-0374.
- Friedman, Norman (2012). British Cruisers of the Victorian Era. Barnsley, UK: Seaforth. ISBN 978-1-59114-068-9.
- Friedman, Norman (2011). Naval Weapons of World War One: Guns, Torpedoes, Mines and ASW Weapons of All Nations; An Illustrated Directory. Barnsley, UK: Seaforth Publishing. ISBN 978-1-84832-100-7.
- Massie, Robert K. (2004). Castles of Steel: Britain, Germany, and the Winning of the Great War at Sea. London: Jonathan Cape. ISBN 0-224-04092-8.
- Silverstone, Paul H. (1984). Directory of the World's Capital Ships. New York: Hippocrene Books. ISBN 0-88254-979-0.
