= Cressy-class cruiser =

British armoured ship class (1901–1920)

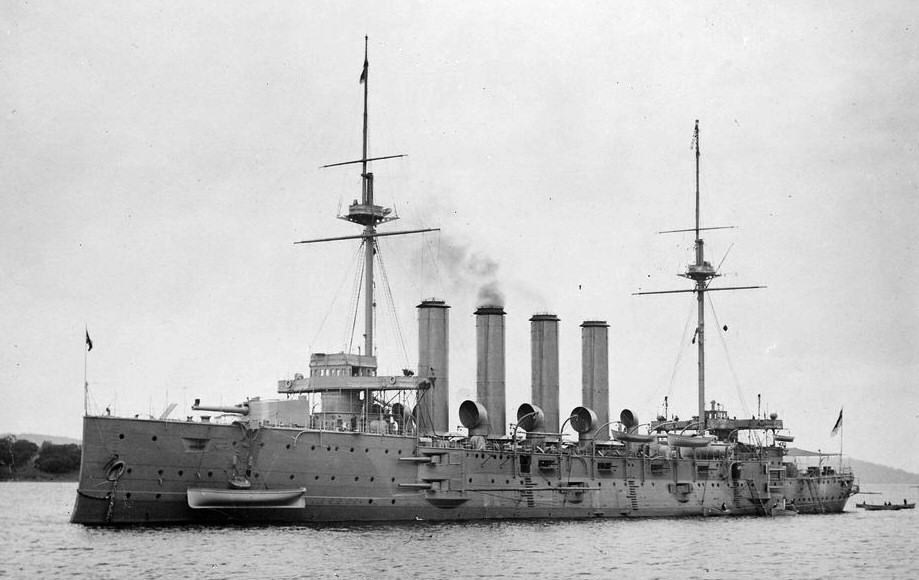
- HMS Euryalus at anchor in Australia

Class overview
- Name: Cressy class
- Builders: Fairfields (2); John Brown & Co. (2); Vickers, Sons & Maxim (2)
- Operators: Royal Navy
- Preceded by: Diadem class
- Succeeded by: Drake class
- Built: 1898–1902
- In service: 1901–1920
- Completed: 6
- Lost: 3
- Scrapped: 3

General characteristics
- Type: Armoured cruiser
- Displacement: 12,000 long tons (12,000 t) (normal)
- Length: 472 ft (143.9 m) (o/a)
- Beam: 69 ft 6 in (21.2 m)
- Draught: 26 ft 9 in (8.2 m) (maximum)
- Installed power: 30 Belleville boilers; 21,000 ihp (16,000 kW)
- Propulsion: 2 × shafts; 2 × triple-expansion steam engines
- Speed: 21 knots (39 km/h; 24 mph)
- Complement: 725–760
- Armament: 2 × single 9.2 in (234 mm) guns; 12 × single 6 in (152 mm) guns; 12 × single 12 pdr (3 in (76 mm)) guns; 3 × single 3 pdr (47-mm) guns; 2 × 18 in (450 mm) torpedo tubes
- Armour: Belt: 2–6 in (51–152 mm); Decks: 1–3 in (25–76 mm); Barbettes: 6 in (152 mm); Turrets: 6 in (150 mm); Conning tower: 12 in (305 mm); Bulkheads: 5 in (127 mm)

The Cressy-class cruiser was a class of six armoured cruisers built for the Royal Navy around 1900. Their design's incorporation of a pair of 9.2-inch guns and armoured sides served to address criticism directed against the previous Diadem class — advances made possible by their 1,000 ton increase in displacement over their predecessors. The ships were notably stable, except for a susceptibility to pitching.

== Service ==
Until 1908, the ships served in Home waters, the Mediterranean and the Far East. On the outbreak of the First World War Cressy, Aboukir, Hogue, Bacchante and Euryalus formed the Seventh Cruiser Squadron. Due to the obsolescence of the ships and because they were crewed by inexperienced reservists the squadron was known as the "Live Bait Squadron". This epithet proved prophetic when Cressy, Hogue and Aboukir were sunk in a single action on 22 September 1914 by the German submarine U-9 near the Dutch coast. After the first cruiser had been hit, the following cruisers both came to a dead halt to pick up survivors, making themselves easy targets for torpedoes.

== Ships ==
- HMS Cressy: launched 4 December 1899, torpedoed and sunk 22 September 1914
- HMS Sutlej: launched 18 November 1899, scrapped 9 May 1921
- HMS Aboukir: launched 16 May 1900, torpedoed and sunk 22 September 1914
- HMS Hogue: launched 13 August 1900, torpedoed and sunk 22 September 1914
- HMS Bacchante: launched 21 February 1901, scrapped 1 July 1920
- HMS Euryalus: launched 20 May 1901, scrapped 1 July 1920

== Building Programme ==
The following table gives the build details and purchase cost of the members of the Cressy class. Standard British practice at that time was for these costs to exclude armament and stores. The compilers of The Naval Annual revised costs quoted for British ships between the 1905 and 1906 editions.

Ship	Builder	Engine Maker	Date of			Cost according to		Fate
Ship	Builder	Engine Maker	Laid down	Launch	Completion	(BNA 1904)	(BNA 1906)	
Cressy	Fairfield Shipbuilding and Engineering Company, Govan	Fairfield	12 October 1898	14 December 1899	28 May 1901	£780,110	£749,324	torpedoed 22 Sept 1914
Sutlej	John Brown & Company Clydebank	Clydebank; Company	15 August 1898	18 November 1899	6 May 1902	£790,706	£755,690	scrapped 9 May 1921
Aboukir	Fairfield Shipbuilding and Engineering Company, Govan	Fairfield	9 November 1898	16 May 1900	3 April 1902	£783,883	£751,118	torpedoed 22 Sept 1914
Hogue	Vickers, Sons & Maxim, Barrow	Vickers	14 July 1898	13 August 1900	19 November 1902	£787,507	£749,809	torpedoed 22 Sept 1914
Bacchante	John Brown and Company, Clydebank	John Brown	15 February 1899	21 February 1901	25 November 1902	£787,230	£787,230	scrapped 1 July 1920
Euryalus	Vickers Sons & Maxim, Barrow	Vickers	18 July 1899	20 May 1901	5 January 1904	£817,880	£782,901	scrapped 1 July 1920

== Image gallery ==
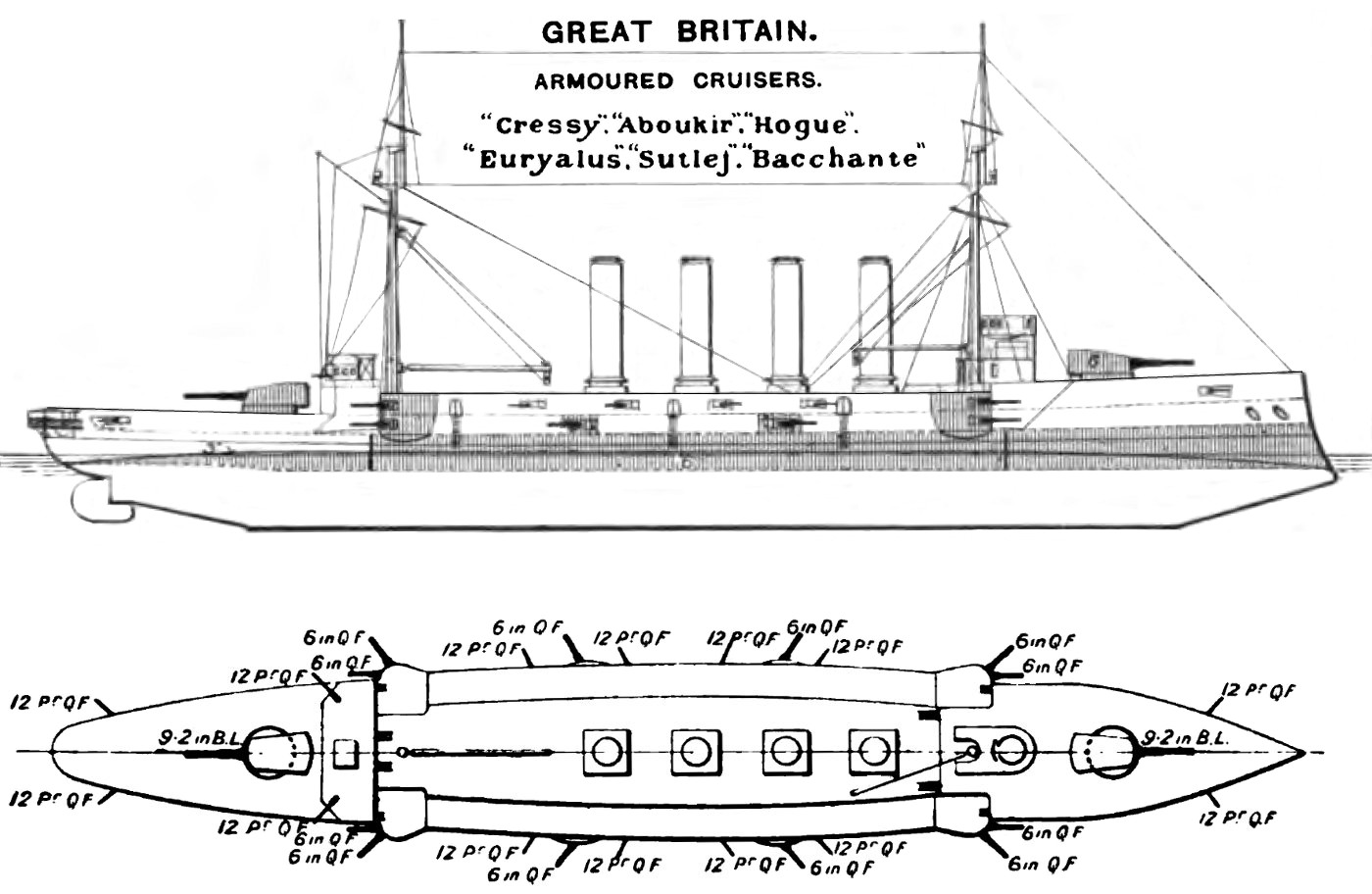
Right elevation and deck plan, from Brassey's Naval Annual 1906

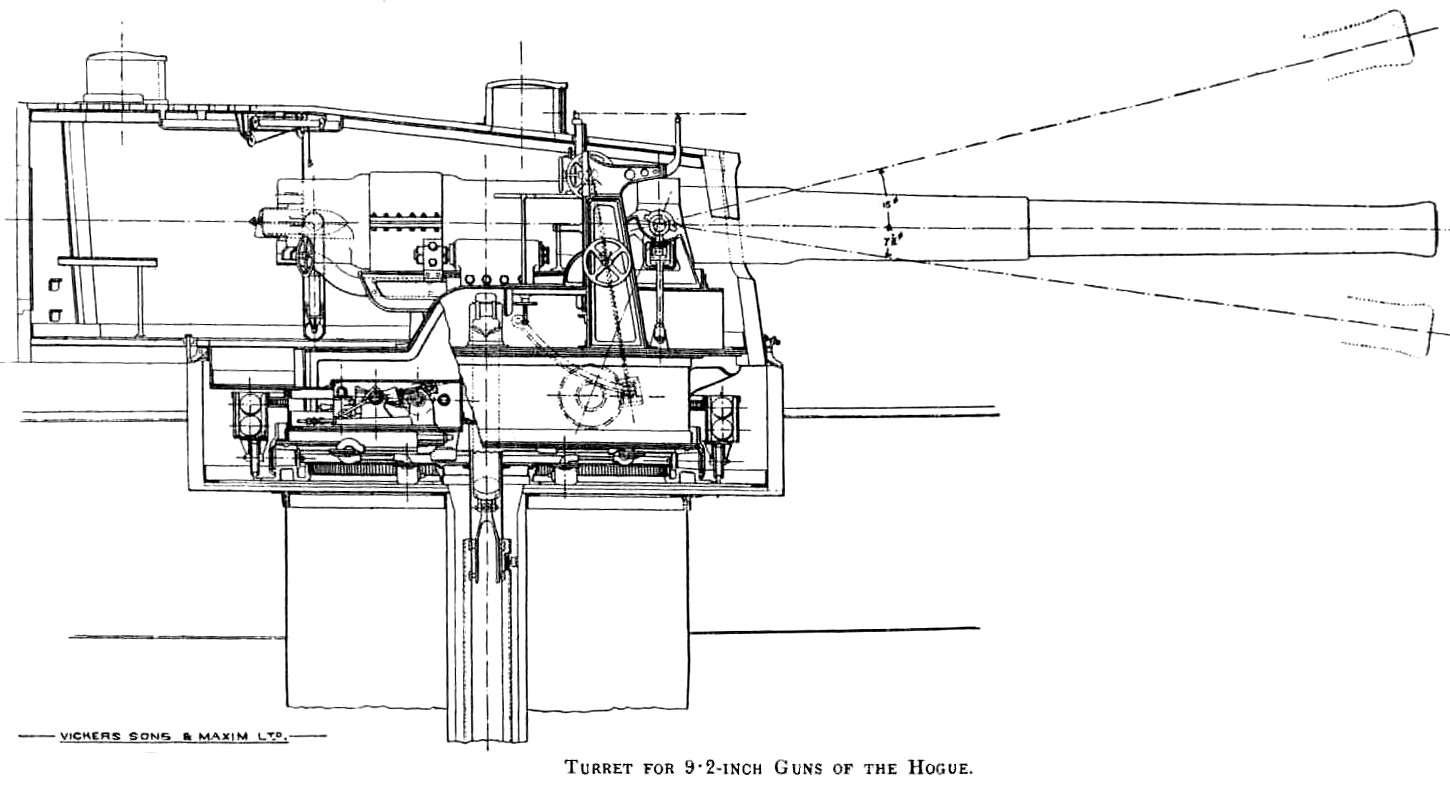
Right elevation of 9.2 inch gun turret

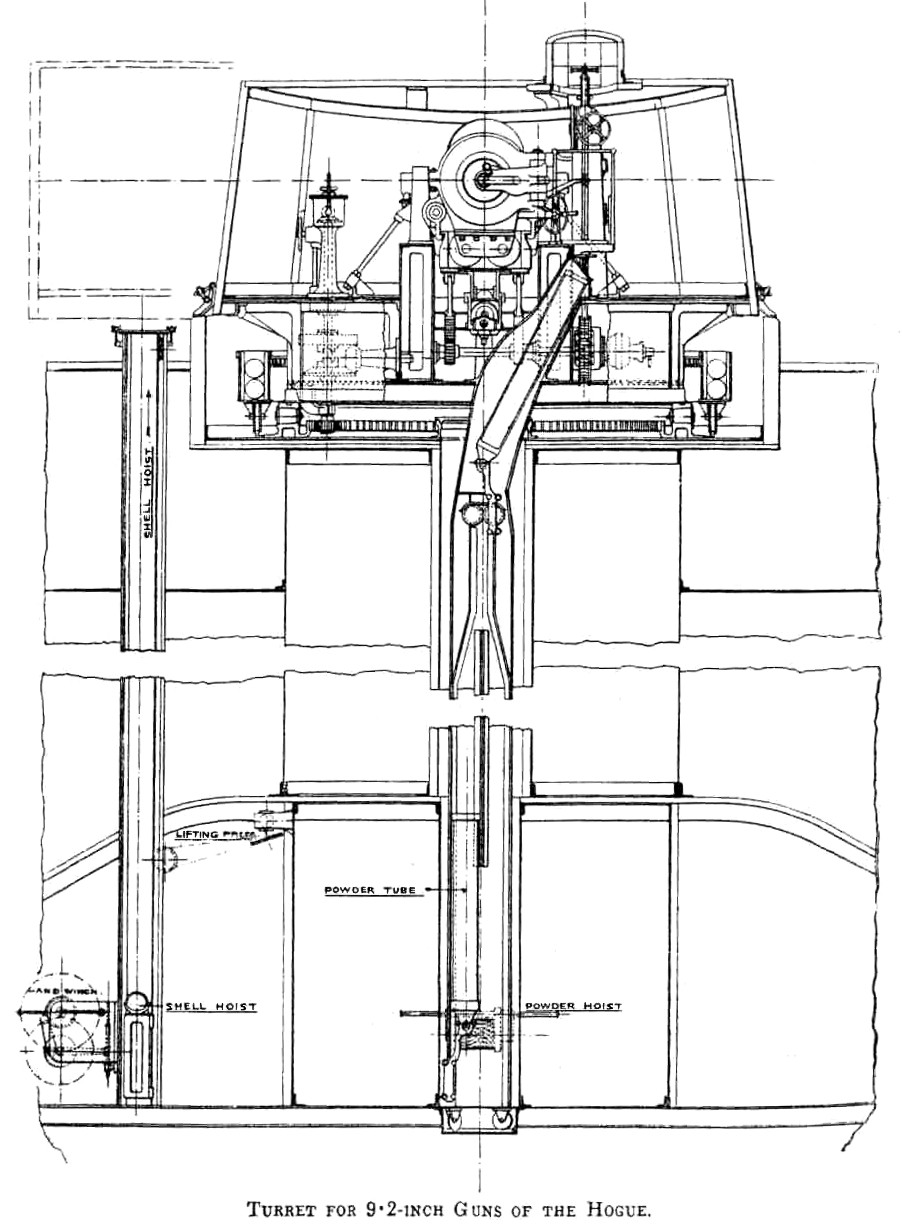
Rear elevation of 9.2 inch gun turret

== Notes ==
1. The Cressy, Hogue and Aboukir were all sunk in under an hour by the German submarine SM U-9.

== Bibliography ==
- Brassey, T.A. (ed) The Naval Annual 1904
- Chesneau, Roger & Kolesnik, Eugene M., eds. (1979). Conway's All the World's Fighting Ships 1860–1905. Greenwich: Conway Maritime Press. ISBN 0-8317-0302-4.
- Corbett, Julian. Naval Operations to the Battle of the Falklands. History of the Great War: Based on Official Documents. Vol. I (2nd, reprint of the 1938 ed.). London and Nashville, Tennessee: Imperial War Museum and Battery Press. ISBN 0-89839-256-X.
- Friedman, Norman (2012). British Cruisers of the Victorian Era. Barnsley, South Yorkshire, UK: Seaforth. ISBN 978-1-59114-068-9.
- Friedman, Norman (2011). Naval Weapons of World War One. Barnsley, South Yorkshire, UK: Seaforth. ISBN 978-1-84832-100-7.
- Leyland, J. and Brassey, T.A. (ed)The Naval Annual 1906
- Massie, Robert K. (2004). Castles of Steel: Britain, Germany, and the Winning of the Great War at Sea. London: Jonathan Cape. ISBN 0-224-04092-8.
- Silverstone, Paul H. (1984). Directory of the World's Capital Ships. New York: Hippocrene Books. ISBN 0-88254-979-0.
