= 7th Cruiser Squadron =

Cruiser formation of the Royal Navy

Coordinates: 51.638961°N 0.67489°E

- Active: 1912–1914
- Country: United Kingdom
- Allegiance: British Empire
- Branch: Royal Navy
- Size: 5 ships
- Engagements: Action of 22 September 1914; Battle of Cape Passero (1940)

Commanders
- Notable commanders: Rear-Admiral Arthur Christian

The 7th Cruiser Squadron (also known as Cruiser Force C) was a blockading force of the Royal Navy during the First World War used to close the English Channel to German traffic. It was employed patrolling an area of the North Sea known as the Broad Fourteens in support of vessels guarding the northern entrance to the Channel. The Squadron had been part of the Third Fleet of the Home Fleets.

The squadron came to public attention when on 22 September 1914, three of the cruisers were sunk by one German submarine while on patrol. Approximately 1,460 sailors were killed and there was a public outcry at the losses. The incident eroded confidence in the government and damaged the reputation of the Royal Navy, at a time when many countries were still considering which side they might support in the war.

== Creation ==
The 7th Cruiser Squadron (also Cruiser Force C in 1914) was created at the Nore as part of the reorganisation of the Royal Navy's home fleets which took effect on 1 May 1912. It formed part of the Third Fleet of the Home Fleets and effectively served as a reserve force stationed on the south coast of England. The squadron was composed mainly of five of the six Cressy-class armoured cruisers, which had been transferred from the 6th Cruiser Squadron of the former divisional structure of the Home Fleets, and already considered obsolescent despite being fewer than 12 years old. Their status meant that most of the time they were manned by "nucleus crews" an innovation introduced by Admiral John "Jackie" Fisher a few years earlier. Their ships' complements of 700 men plus officers were only brought up to full strength for manœuvres or mobilisation. The nucleus crews were expected to keep the ships in a seaworthy condition the rest of the time.

The 1913 manœuvres illustrate the system. In June, the command of squadrons was announced by the Admiralty. As a reserve formation, the 7th Cruiser Squadron had no flag officer until 10 June, when Rear-Admiral Gordon Moore—Third Sea Lord—was given the command upon taking leave from the Admiralty. He hoisted his flag in Bacchante on 15 July. All ships of the squadron would have been brought up to strength with men from other parts of the navy and from the Royal Naval Reserve. The manœuvres took place and on 9 August Rear-Admiral Moore struck his flag and on the 16th the squadron was reduced back to reserve commission.

== First World War ==
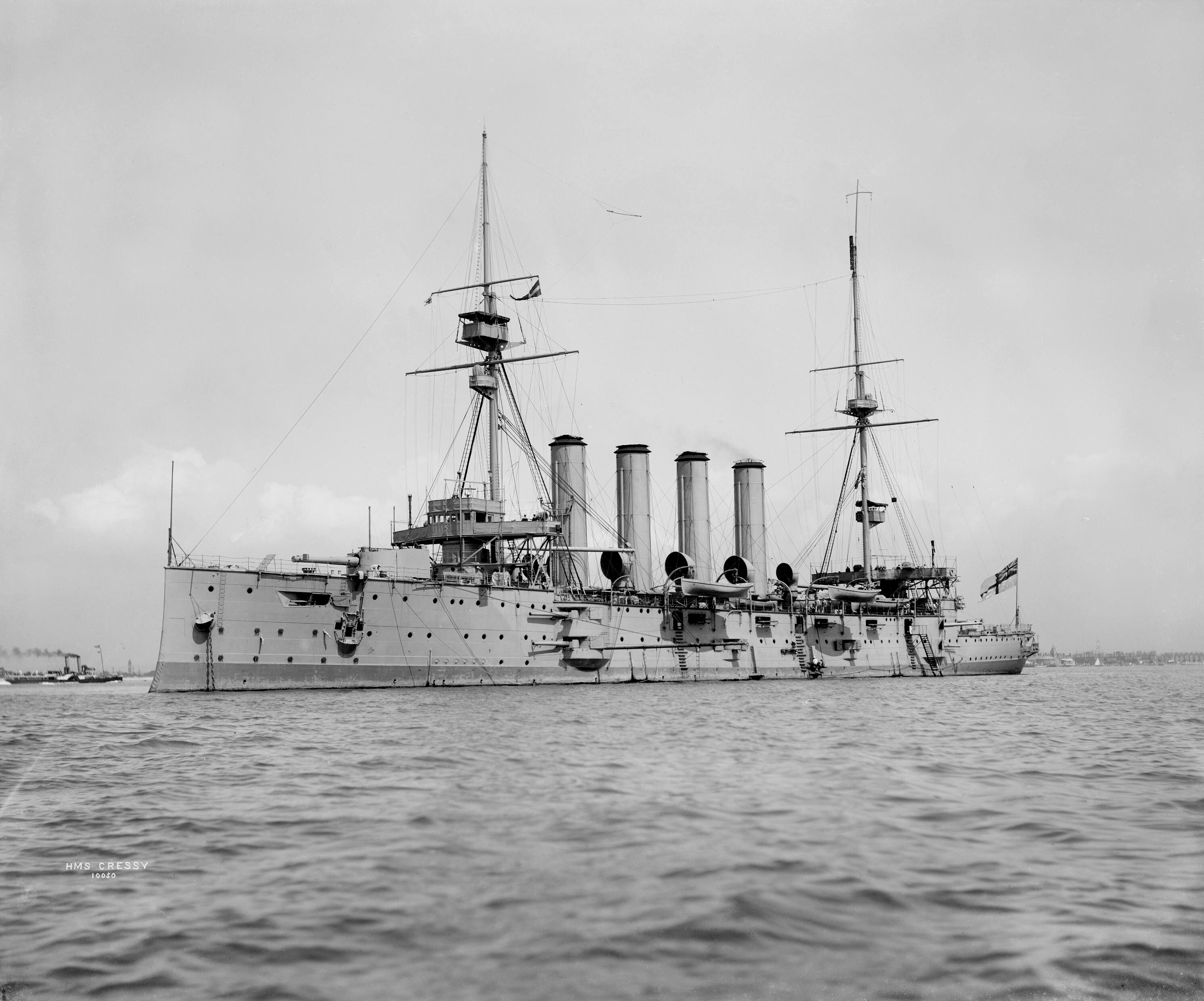
HMS Cressy, lead ship of the squadron

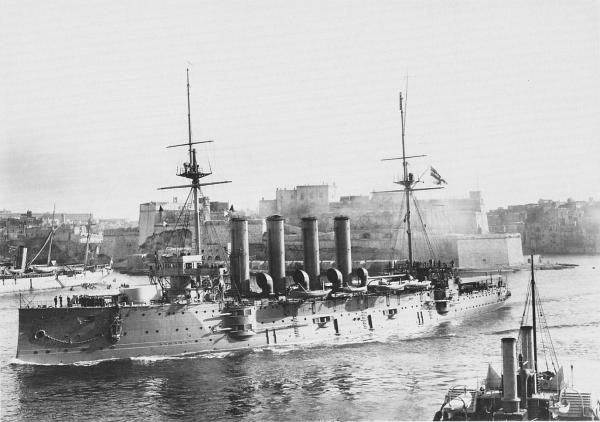
HMS Aboukir

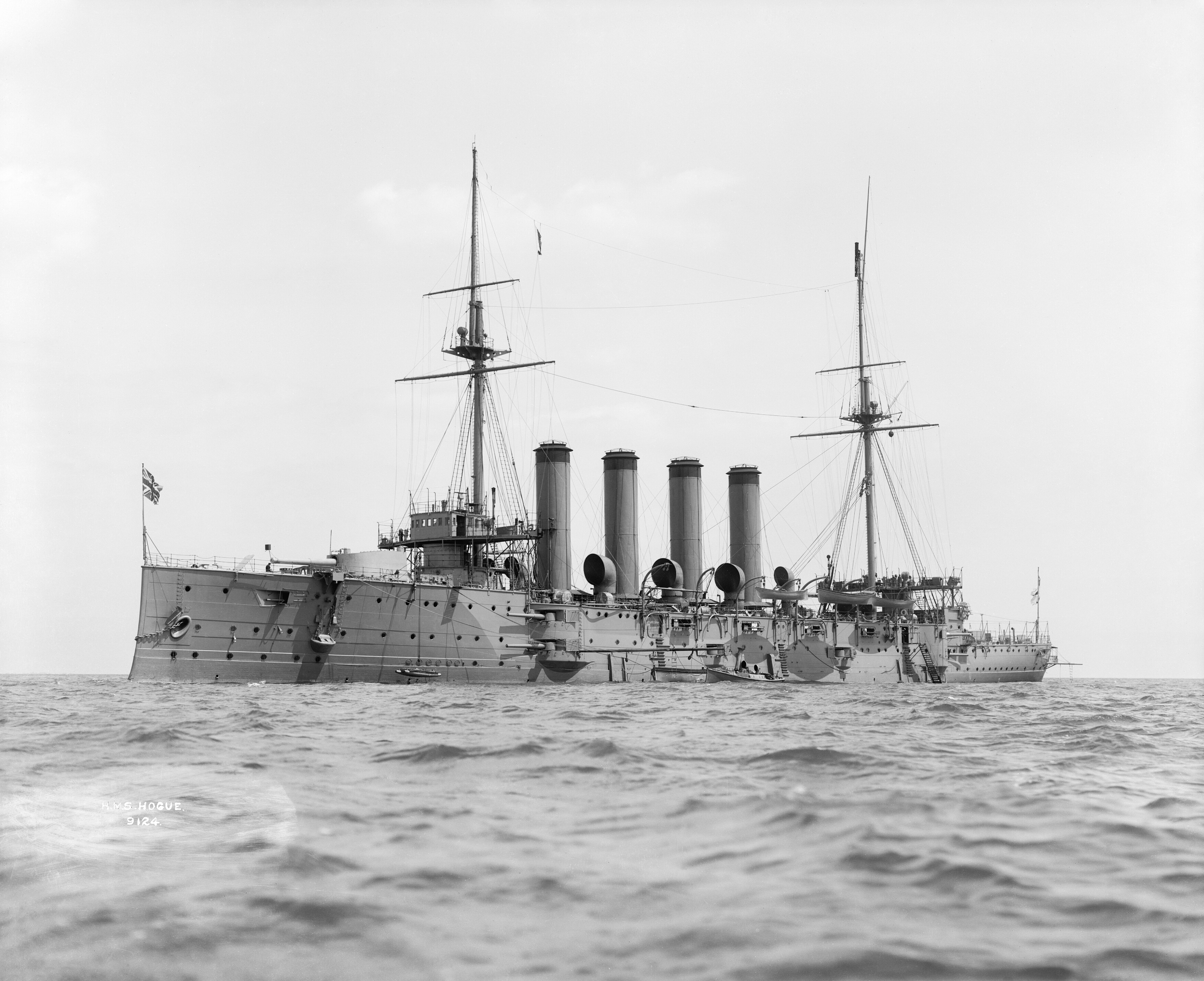
HMS Hogue

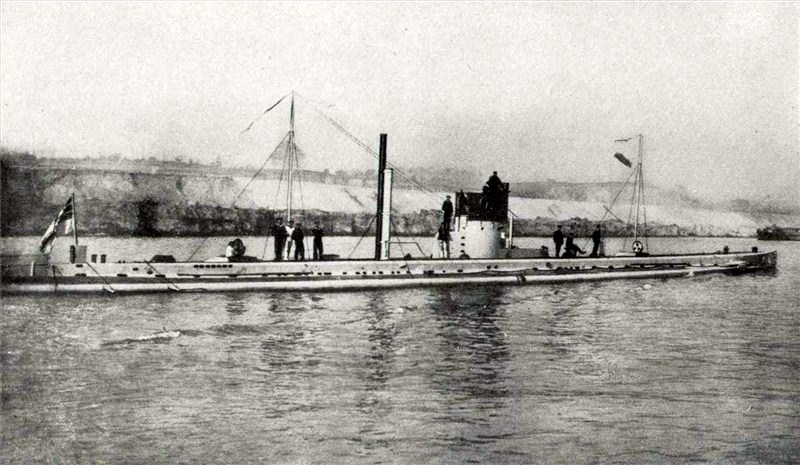
U-9

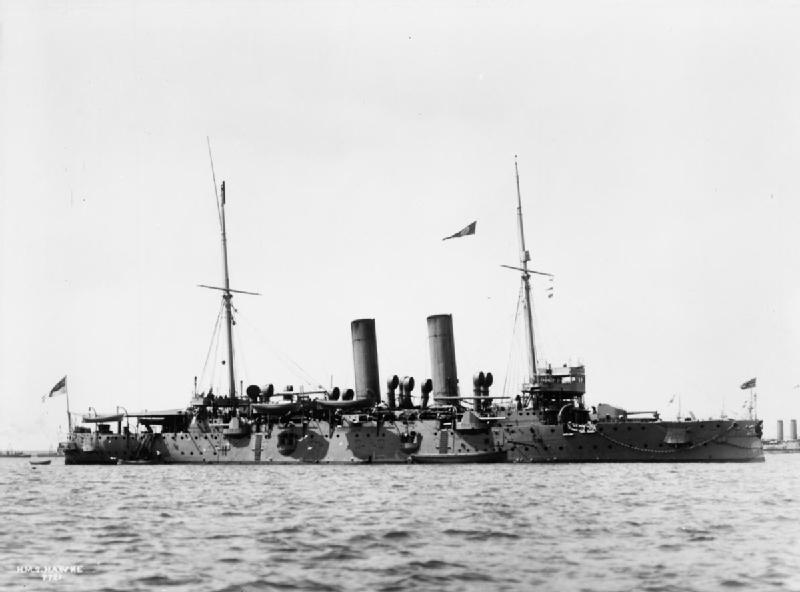
HMS Hawke

Upon the outbreak of war with Germany in 1914, the Second and Third Fleets of the Royal Navy were combined to form a Channel Fleet. The 7th Cruiser Squadron consisted of Cressy, Aboukir, Bacchante, Euryalus and Hogue. Their task was to patrol the relatively shallow waters of the Dogger Bank and the Broad Fourteens in the North Sea, supported by destroyers of the Harwich Force. The aim was to protect ships carrying supplies between Britain and France against German ships operating from the northern German naval ports.

Although the cruisers had been designed for a speed of 21 knots (39 km/h; 24 mph), wear and tear meant they could now only manage 15 knots (28 km/h; 17 mph) at most and more typically only 12 knots (22 km/h; 14 mph). Bad weather sometimes meant that the smaller destroyers could not sail and at such times the cruisers would patrol alone. A continuous patrol was maintained with some ships on station, while others returned to harbour for coal and supplies.

From 26 to 28 August 1914, the squadron was held in reserve during the operations which led to the Battle of Heligoland Bight.

=== The Live Bait Squadron ===
On 21 August, Commodore Roger Keyes—commanding a submarine squadron also stationed at Harwich—wrote to his superior Admiral Sir Arthur Leveson warning that in his opinion the ships were at extreme risk of attack and sinking by German ships because of their age and inexperienced crews. The risk to the ships was so severe that they had earned the nickname "the live bait squadron" within the fleet. By 17 September, the note reached the attention of First Lord of the Admiralty Winston Churchill who met with Keyes and Commodore Reginald Tyrwhitt—commander of a destroyer squadron operating from Harwich—while travelling to Scapa Flow to visit the Grand Fleet on 18 September. Churchill—in consultation with the First Sea Lord Prince Louis of Battenberg—agreed that the cruisers should be withdrawn and wrote a memo stating:

The Bacchantes ought not to continue on this beat. The risks to such ships is not justified by any services they can render.

Vice Admiral Frederick Sturdee—chief of the Admiralty war staff—objected that, while the cruisers should be replaced, no modern ships were available and the older vessels were the only ships that could be used during bad weather. It was therefore agreed between Battenberg and Sturdee to leave them on station until the arrival of new Arethusa-class cruisers then being built.

=== Sinking of three cruisers ===
At around 06:00 on 22 September, the three cruisers Aboukir, Cressy and Hogue were steaming, alone, at 10 knots (19 km/h; 12 mph) in line ahead under the command of Captain J. E. Drummond of Aboukir. The 7th Cruiser Squadron flagship, their sister ship Euryalus, as well as their light cruiser and destroyer screen, had been forced temporarily to return to base, leaving the three obsolete cruisers on their own. They were spotted by the German submarine U-9, commanded by Lt. Otto Weddigen. They were not zigzagging but all of the ships had lookouts posted to search for periscopes and one gun on each side of each ship was manned.

Weddigen ordered his submarine to submerge and closed the range with the unsuspecting British ships. At close range, he fired a torpedo at Aboukir. The torpedo broke the back of Aboukir and she sank within 20 minutes with the loss of 527 men. The captains of Cressy and Hogue thought Aboukir had struck a floating mine and came forward to assist her. Hogue hove to and began to pick up survivors. Weddigen fired two torpedoes into Hogue, mortally wounding her but the submarine surfaced and was fired upon. As Hogue sank, the captain of Cressy knew that the squadron was being attacked by a submarine and should have tried to flee; this was not yet considered the proper action to take. Cressy came to a stop amongst the survivors; Weddigen fired two more torpedoes into Cressy and sank her as well.

Dutch ships were nearby and destroyers from Harwich were brought to the scene by distress signals; the brave intervention of two Dutch coasters and an English trawler prevented the loss from being even greater than it was. The rescue vessels saved 837 men but of the crews, 1,397 men and 62 officers, were lost. A term (class) of Dartmouth naval cadets was aboard these ships, and many of the cadets were lost in the disaster.

=== Aftermath ===
Otto Weddigen returned to Germany as the first naval hero of the war and was awarded the Iron Cross, Second and First Class. Each member of his crew received the Iron Cross, Second Class. The German achievement shook the reputation of the British Navy throughout the world. Despite the age of Cressy-class vessels, many Britons did not believe the sinking of three large armoured ships could have been the work of one submarine but that other submarines and perhaps other non-British craft must have been involved. Admirals Beatty and Fisher spoke out against the folly of placing such ships where they had been. Churchill was widely blamed by the public for the disaster despite his memo of 18 September that the older ships should not be used in the venture.

Rear-Admiral Arthur Christian was suspended on half pay and later reinstated by Battenberg. Drummond was criticised for not zig-zagging to shake off submarines and for not requesting destroyer support as soon as the weather improved. Zig-zagging had not been taken seriously by ships' captains who had not experienced submarine attacks; the tactic thereafter was made compulsory in dangerous waters. All big warships were instructed never to approach a ship severely disabled by mine or torpedo but to steam away and leave the rescue to smaller vessels.

Three weeks later, the German war hero Weddigen—now operating U-9 off Aberdeen—torpedoed and sank Hawke, another British cruiser that was not zig-zagging in hostile waters. Weddigen was killed in March 1915 during a German raid in the Pentland Firth when his submarine—U-29—was intentionally rammed by the battleship Dreadnought. The remaining Cressy class ships were dispersed from the British Isles. The remnants of the 7th Cruiser Squadron was reconstituted the following year as part of the Grand Fleet, which contained many better armoured and more modern ships than Bacchantes but in 1916 the 7th was disbanded again. It did not see service at the Battle of Jutland.

== Second World War ==
The squadron was reformed for the third time on 18 July 1940 and was placed under the command of Rear-Admiral, Edward de Faye Renouf. It was a unit within the Northern Patrol then under the command of Vice Admiral Sir Max Horton. In March 1941 the squadron was disbanded.

== Rear-Admirals commanding ==
Included:

	Rank	Flag	Name	Term
Rear-Admiral Commanding, 7th Cruiser Squadron
1	Rear-Admiral	Rear-Admiral - Royal Navy	Gordon Moore	10 June – 9 August 1913
squadron disbanded September 1913 – July 1914 (placed back in reserve)
2	Rear-Admiral	Rear-Admiral - Royal Navy	Arthur Christian	13–26 July 1914
3	Rear-Admiral	Rear-Admiral - Royal Navy	Henry Campbell	1 August – 6 October 1914
squadron disbanded October–December 1915
4	Rear-Admiral	Rear-Admiral - Royal Navy	Arthur Waymouth	14 January – 6 April 1915
5	Rear-Admiral	Rear-Admiral - Royal Navy	Henry Tottenham	7 April – 25 October 1915
6	Rear-Admiral	Rear-Admiral - Royal Navy	Herbert L. Heath	24 October 1915 – 5 June 1916
squadron disbanded August 1916 – June 1940
7	Rear-Admiral	Rear-Admiral - Royal Navy	Edward de F. Renouf	18 July 1940 – 6 March 1941
