= HMS Hogue (1900) =

1900 Cressy-class armoured cruiser

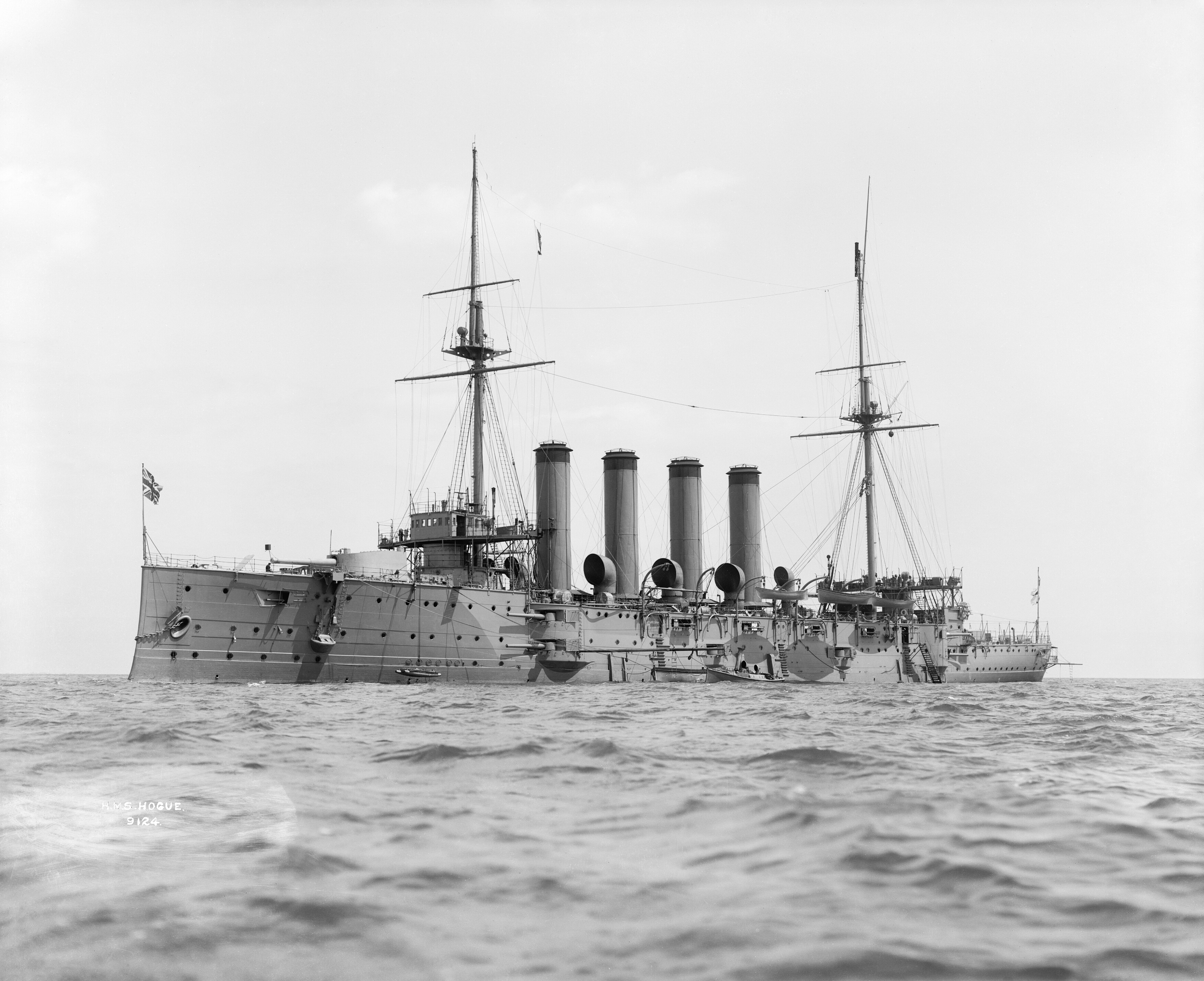
- Hogue at anchor

History

United Kingdom
- Name: HMS Hogue
- Namesake: Battle of La Hogue
- Builder: Vickers, Sons & Maxim, Barrow-in-Furness
- Laid down: 14 July 1898
- Launched: 13 August 1900
- Completed: October 1902
- Commissioned: 19 November 1902
- Fate: Sunk, 22 September 1914

General characteristics
- Class & type: Cressy-class armoured cruiser
- Displacement: 12,000 long tons (12,000 t) (normal)
- Length: 472 ft (143.9 m) (o/a)
- Beam: 69 ft 6 in (21.2 m)
- Draught: 26 ft 9 in (8.2 m) (maximum)
- Installed power: 21,000 ihp (16,000 kW); 30 Belleville boilers
- Propulsion: 2 × Shafts; 2 × Triple-expansion steam engines
- Speed: 21 knots (39 km/h; 24 mph)
- Complement: 725–760
- Armament: 2 × single BL 9.2-inch Mk X guns; 12 × single BL 6-inch Mk VII guns; 12 × single QF 12-pdr 12 cwt guns (Note: "Cwt" is the abbreviation for hundredweight, 12 cwt referring to the weight of the gun.); 3 × QF 3-pounder Hotchkiss guns; 2 × single submerged 18-inch torpedo tubes
- Armour: Belt: 2–6 in (51–152 mm); Decks: 1–3 in (25–76 mm); Barbettes: 6 in (152 mm); Turrets: 6 in (150 mm); Conning tower: 12 in (305 mm); Bulkheads: 5 in (127 mm)

HMS Hogue was a Cressy-class armoured cruiser built for the Royal Navy around 1900. Upon completion she was assigned to the Channel Fleet and the China Station. In 1906 she became a training ship for the North America and West Indies Station before being placed in reserve in 1908. Recommissioned at the start of World War I, she played a minor role in the Battle of Heligoland Bight a few weeks after the beginning of the war. Hogue was sunk by the German submarine U-9, together with two of her sister ships, on 22 September 1914.

== Design and description ==
Hogue was designed to displace 12,000 long tons (12,000 t). The ship had an overall length of 472 feet (143.9 m), a beam of 69 feet 6 inches (21.2 m) and a deep draught of 26 feet 9 inches (8.2 m). She was powered by two 4-cylinder triple-expansion steam engines, each driving one shaft, which produced a total of 21,000 indicated horsepower (15,660 kW) using steam provided by 30 Belleville boilers. The engines were designed to give a maximum speed of 21 knots (39 km/h; 24 mph), although Hogue reached 22.06 knots (40.86 km/h; 25.39 mph) with 21,432 indicated horsepower (15,982 kW) on her sea trials. She carried a maximum of 1,600 long tons (1,600 t) of coal and her complement ranged from 725 to 760 officers and ratings.

Her main armament consisted of two breech-loading (BL) 9.2-inch (234 mm) Mk X guns in single gun turrets, one each fore and aft of the superstructure. They fired 380-pound (170 kg) shells to a range of 15,500 yards (14,200 m). Her secondary armament of twelve BL 6-inch Mk VII guns was arranged in casemates amidships. Eight of these were mounted on the main deck and were only usable in calm weather. They had a maximum range of approximately 12,200 yards (11,200 m) with their 100-pound (45 kg) shells. A dozen quick-firing (QF) 12-pounder 12 cwt guns were fitted for defence against torpedo boats, eight on casemates on the upper deck and four in the superstructure. The ship also carried three 3-pounder Hotchkiss guns and two submerged 18-inch torpedo tubes.

The ship's waterline armour belt had a maximum thickness of 6 inches (152 mm) and was closed off by 5-inch (127 mm) transverse bulkheads. The armour of the gun turrets and their barbettes was 6 inches thick while the casemate armour was 5 inches thick. The protective deck armour ranged in thickness from 1–3 inches (25–76 mm) and the conning tower was protected by 12 inches (305 mm) of armour.

== Construction and service ==
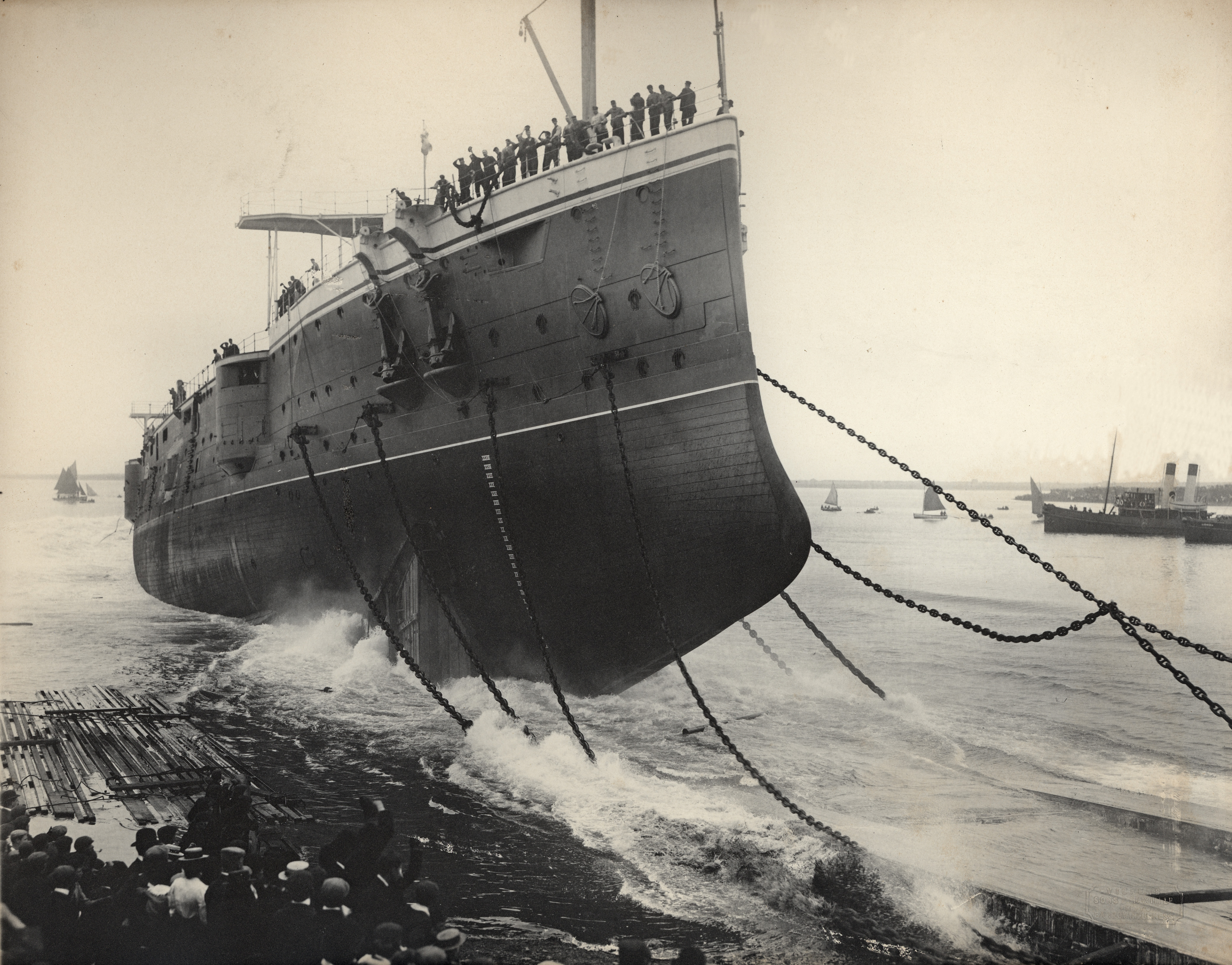
Launching of Hogue, 1900

Hogue, named after the 1692 Battle of La Hogue, was laid down on 14 July 1898 by Vickers, Sons & Maxim at their Barrow-in-Furness shipyard and launched on 13 August 1900. She arrived at Plymouth to begin fitting out in September 1901, and commenced her sea trials in early December. Hogue was completed in late Autumn the following year, and commissioned at Devonport on 19 November 1902. She was assigned to the Channel Squadron and joined the other vessels of the squadron off Portland in early February 1903, then taking part in a cruise visiting Berehaven, Madeira, Porto Santo Island and Vigo before returning to Berehaven in mid-March. On 11 March 1904 she collided with the merchant ship SS Meurthe off Europa Point. Later that year she was transferred to the China Station after a refit.

Two years later Hogue became the boys' training ship for the 4th Cruiser Squadron on the North America and West Indies Station. She was reduced to reserve at Devonport in 1908 and then assigned to the reserve Third Fleet at the Nore the next year. On 26 November 1909 a coal bunker explosion killed two crewmen. The ship received a lengthy refit at Chatham Dockyard in 1912–13 and was assigned to the 7th Cruiser Squadron shortly after the outbreak of World War I in August 1914.

The squadron was tasked with patrolling the Broad Fourteens of the North Sea in support of a force of destroyers and submarines based at Harwich which protected the eastern end of the English Channel from German warships attempting to attack the supply route between England and France. During the Battle of Heligoland Bight on 28 August, the ship was part of Cruiser Force 'C', in reserve off the Dutch coast, and saw no action. Hogue did, however, tow the heavily damaged light cruiser Arethusa, flagship of the commander of the Harwich Force, Commodore Reginald Tyrwhitt, back to port after the battle was over.

=== Fate ===
Manoeuvres

On the morning of 22 September, Hogue and her sisters, Aboukir and Cressy, were on patrol without any escorting destroyers as they had been forced to seek shelter from bad weather. The three sisters were in line abreast, about 2,000 yards (1,800 m) apart, at a speed of 10 knots (19 km/h; 12 mph). They were not expecting submarine attack, but they had lookouts posted and had one gun manned on each side to attack any submarines sighted. The weather had moderated earlier that morning and Tyrwhitt was en route to reinforce the cruisers with eight destroyers.

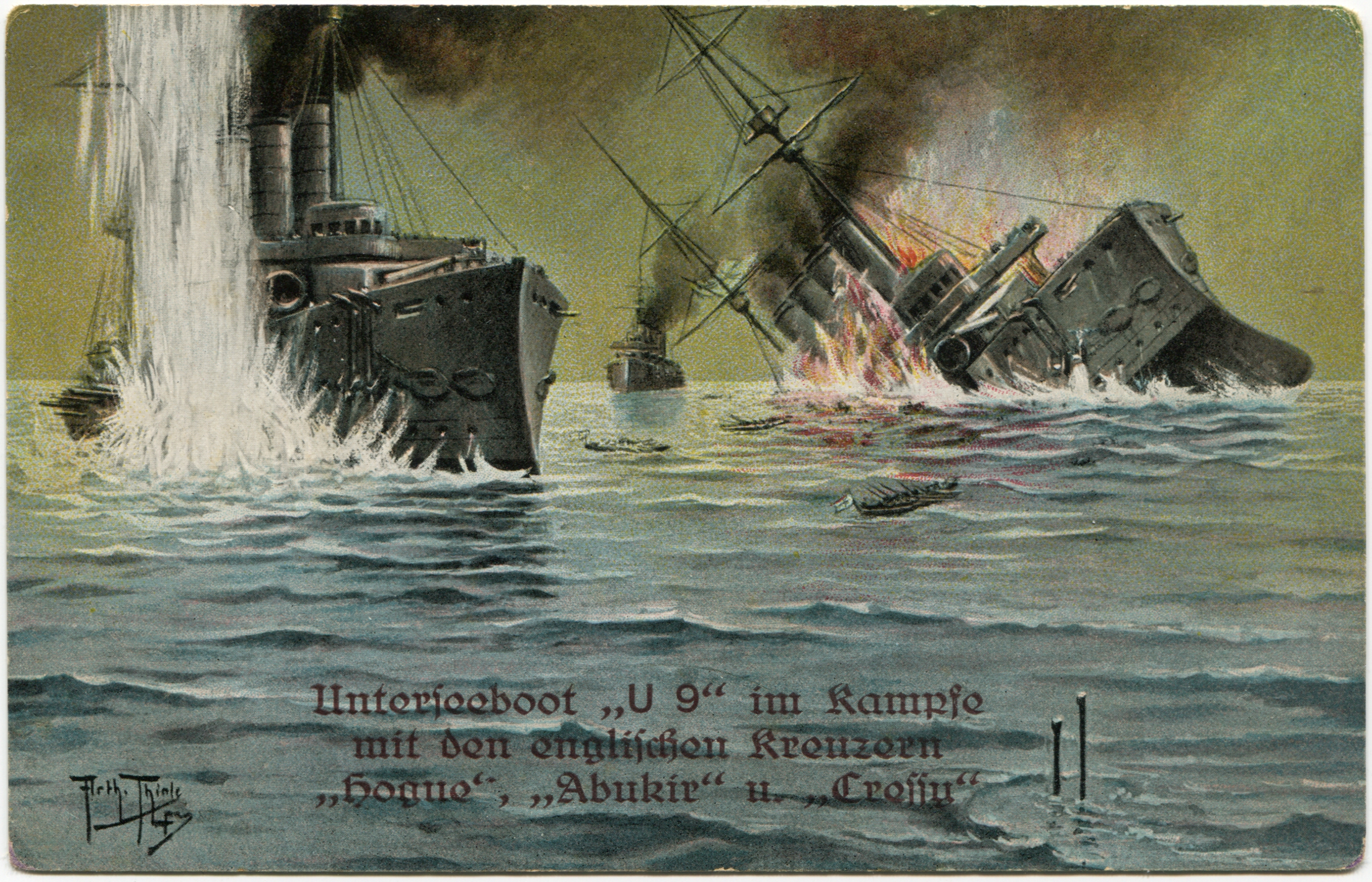
Arthur Thiele, "Submarine U-9 attacking the English cruisers Hogue, Aboukir, and Cressy

U-9, commanded by Kapitänleutnant Otto Weddigen, had been ordered to attack British transports at Ostend, but had been forced to dive and take shelter from the storm. On surfacing, she spotted the British ships and moved to attack. She fired one torpedo at 06:20 at Aboukir that struck her on the starboard side; the ship's captain thought he had struck a mine and ordered the other two ships to close to transfer his wounded men. Aboukir quickly began listing and capsized around 06:55. As Hogue approached her sinking sister, Captain Wilmot Nicholson realised that it had been a submarine attack and signalled Cressy to look for a periscope although his ship continued to close on Aboukir as her crew threw overboard anything that would float to aid the survivors in the water. Having stopped and lowered all her boats, Hogue was struck by two torpedoes around 06:55. The sudden weight loss of the two torpedoes caused U-9 to broach the surface and Hogue's gunners opened fire without effect before the submarine could submerge again. The cruiser capsized about ten minutes after being torpedoed as all of her watertight doors had been open and sank at 07:15.

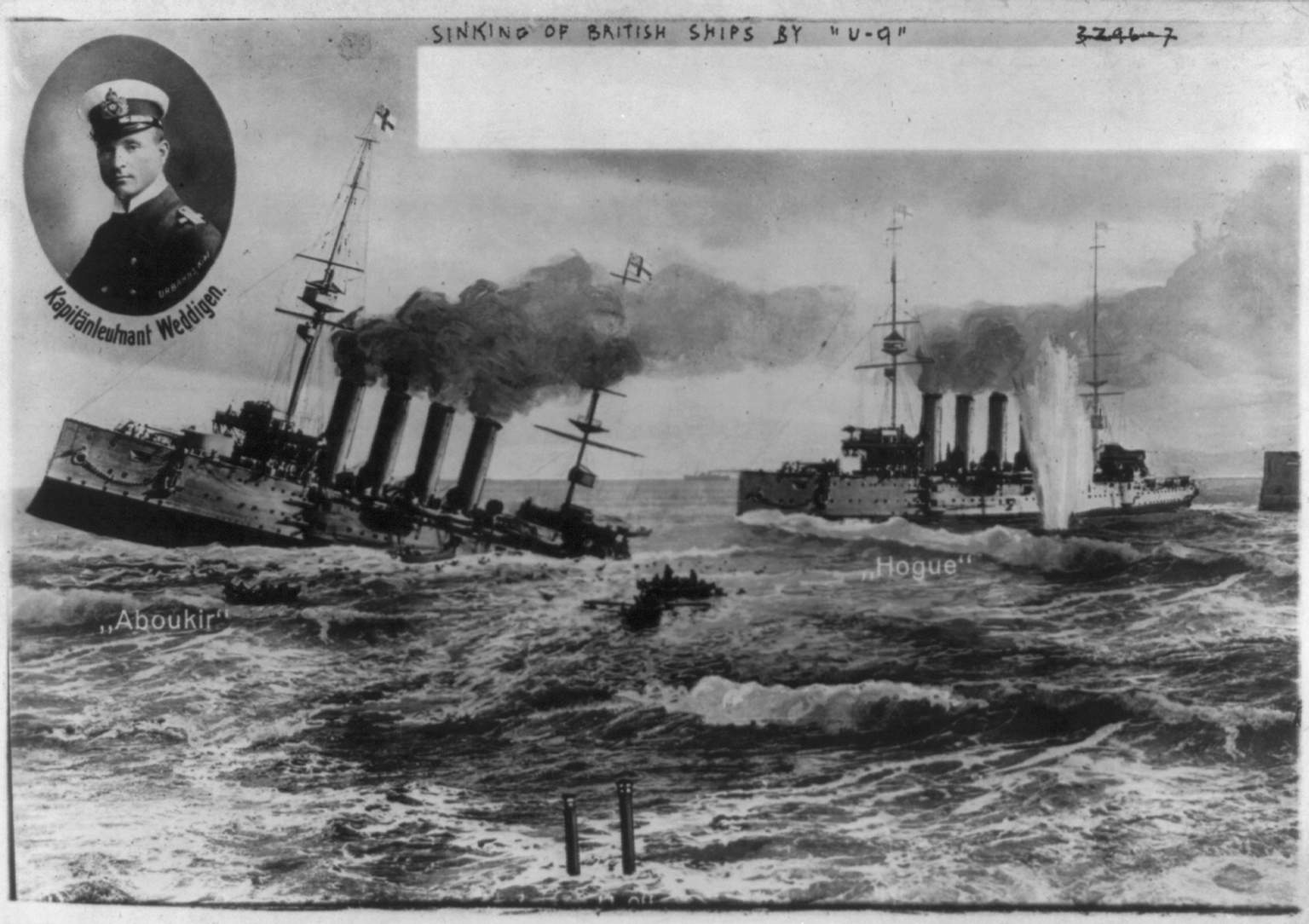
Victories of U-9 on a postcard

Cressy attempted to ram the submarine, but did not hit anything and resumed her rescue efforts until she too was torpedoed at 07:20. She too took on a heavy list and then capsized before sinking at 07:55. Several Dutch ships began rescuing survivors at 08:30 and were joined by British fishing trawlers before Tyrwhitt and his ships arrived at 10:45. The combined total from all three ships was 837 men rescued and 62 officers and 1,397 ratings lost. Hogue lost 377 men.

In 1954 the British government sold the salvage rights to all three ships to a German company and they were subsequently sold again to a Dutch salvage company which began salvaging the wrecks' metal in 2011.

== Bibliography ==
- Chesneau, Roger & Kolesnik, Eugene M., eds. (1979). Conway's All the World's Fighting Ships 1860–1905. Greenwich, UK: Conway Maritime Press. ISBN 0-8317-0302-4.
- Corbett, Julian (1997). Naval Operations to the Battle of the Falklands. History of the Great War: Based on Official Documents. Vol. I (2nd, reprint of the 1938 ed.). London and Nashville, Tennessee: Imperial War Museum and Battery Press. ISBN 0-89839-256-X.
- Firme, Tim; Johnson, Harold & MacDonald, Kevin C. (2005). "Question 27/04: British WW I Armored Cruiser Wrecks". Warship International. XLII (3): 242. ISSN 0043-0374.
- Friedman, Norman (2012). British Cruisers of the Victorian Era. Barnsley, South Yorkshire, UK: Seaforth. ISBN 978-1-59114-068-9.
- Friedman, Norman (2011). Naval Weapons of World War One. Barnsley, South Yorkshire, UK: Seaforth. ISBN 978-1-84832-100-7.
- Massie, Robert K. (2004). Castles of Steel: Britain, Germany, and the Winning of the Great War at Sea. London: Jonathan Cape. ISBN 0-224-04092-8.
- Osborne, Eric W. (2006). The Battle of Heligoland Bight. Bloomington, Indiana: Indiana University Press. ISBN 0-253-34742-4.
- Silverstone, Paul H. (1984). Directory of the World's Capital Ships. New York: Hippocrene Books. ISBN 0-88254-979-0.
