= Wilmot Nicholson =

Royal Navy Admiral (1872-1947)

Admiral Wilmot Nicholson CB
- Born: 18 May 1872
- Died: 9 June 1947 (aged 75)
- Military career
- Allegiance: United Kingdom
- Branch: Royal Navy
- Service years: 1891–1927
- Rank: Admiral
- Commands: HMS Exmouth; HMS Dreadnought; HMS Hogue; Harwich Force; HMS Collingwood; HMS Furious; HMS Eagle; 2nd Cruiser Squadron
- Conflicts: Samoan crisis World War I
- Awards: Companion of the Order of the Bath

Admiral Wilmot Stuart Nicholson CB (18 May 1872 – 9 June 1947) was a Royal Navy officer who became Chief of the Submarine Service.

== Naval career ==
Nicholson joined the Royal Navy in 1891. He was serving as a midshipman in the corvette HMS Calliope when, in "one of the most famous episodes of seamanship in the 19th century", the vessel was the only ship present to avoid being sunk or stranded in the tropical cyclone that struck Apia, Samoa in 1889 during the Samoan crisis. In July 1902 he was posted as first lieutenant and gunnery officer on the pre-dreadnought battleship HMS Prince George, serving in the Channel Squadron. Promoted to captain on 30 June 1909, he became commanding officer of the battleship HMS Exmouth in July 1912 and of the battleship HMS Dreadnought in December 1912.

Nicholson served in the First World War becoming commanding officer of the cruiser HMS Hogue in August 1914: in the action of 22 September 1914 two torpedoes struck Hogue while sailing in the Broad Fourteens; within five minutes, Nicholson gave the order to abandon ship, and after 10 minutes she capsized before sinking at 07:15, result in significant loss of life. After commanding the Harwich Force from 1915 to 1916, he became commanding officer of the battleship HMS Collingwood in December 1916 and of the battlecruiser HMS Furious in March 1917.

After the war Nicholson commanded the aircraft carrier HMS Eagle during her trials. He went on to be commander of the 2nd Cruiser Squadron in May 1921 and Chief of the Submarine Service in September 1923.

== Family ==
Nicholson's wife, Christabel Sybil Caroline Nicholson, was arrested for possession of a paper obtained illegally from the American Embassy in 1940 during the Second World War but was found not guilty of offences under the Official Secrets Act in May 1941.

== Sources ==
- Friedman, Norman (1988). British Carrier Aviation: The Evolution of the Ships and Their Aircraft. Annapolis, Maryland: Naval Institute Press. ISBN 0-87021-054-8.
- Lyon, David (1980). Steam, Steel and Torpedoes. Ipswich: W.S. Cowell, Ltd. for HM Stationery Office. ISBN 0-11-290318-5.
- Massie, Robert K. (2004). Castles of Steel: Britain, Germany, and the Winning of the Great War at Sea. London: Johnathan Cape. ISBN 0-224-04092-8.

Military offices
| Preceded by Hugh Sinclair | Chief of the Submarine Service; 1923–1925 | Succeeded by Vernon Haggard |
