= HMS Bacchante (1901) =

Cruiser of the Royal Navy

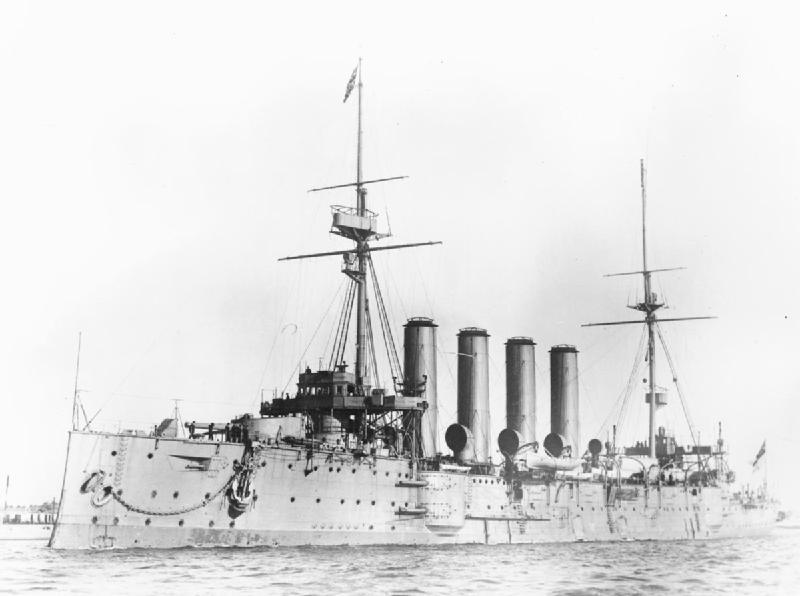
- HMS Bacchante at anchor

History

United Kingdom
- Name: HMS Bacchante
- Namesake: Bacchante
- Ordered: 1897-98 Programme
- Builder: John Brown & Company, Clydebank
- Yard number: 338
- Laid down: 15 February 1899
- Launched: 21 February 1901
- Completed: November 1902
- Commissioned: 25 November 1902
- Fate: Sold for scrap, 1 July 1920

General characteristics
- Class & type: Cressy-class armoured cruiser
- Displacement: 12,000 long tons (12,000 t) (normal)
- Length: 472 ft (143.9 m) (o/a)
- Beam: 69 ft 6 in (21.2 m)
- Draught: 26 ft 9 in (8.2 m) (maximum)
- Installed power: 21,000 ihp (16,000 kW); 30 Belleville boilers
- Propulsion: 2 × shafts; 2 × 4-cylinder triple-expansion steam engines
- Speed: 21 knots (39 km/h; 24 mph)
- Complement: 725–760
- Armament: 2 × single BL 9.2-inch Mk X guns; 12 × single BL 6-inch Mk VII guns; 12 × single QF 12-pounder 12 cwt guns (Note: "Cwt" is the abbreviation for hundredweight, 12 cwt referring to the weight of the gun.); 3 × QF 3-pounder Hotchkiss guns; 2 × single submerged 18-inch torpedo tubes
- Armour: Belt: 2–6 in (51–152 mm); Decks: 1–3 in (25–76 mm); Barbettes: 6 in (152 mm); Turrets: 6 in (150 mm); Conning tower: 12 in (305 mm); Bulkheads: 5 in (127 mm)

HMS Bacchante was a Cressy-class armoured cruiser built for the Royal Navy around 1900. Upon completion she was assigned to the Mediterranean Fleet as flagship of the fleet's cruiser squadron. She was reduced to reserve upon her return home in 1905 before returning to the Mediterranean in 1906. Six years later she returned home and was again placed in reserve. Recommissioned at the start of World War I, Bacchante became flagship of the 7th Cruiser Squadron. She was present at the Battle of Heligoland Bight a few weeks after the war began, but saw no combat.

She was transferred to convoy escort duties in the Bay of Biscay in late 1914 before being sent to Egypt in early 1915. Bacchante was then assigned to support Anzac troops during the Gallipoli Campaign by providing naval gunfire. She covered the landing at Anzac Cove in April as well as several subsequent operations. Returning home in late 1916, she became the flagship of the 9th Cruiser Squadron on convoy escort duties off the African coast in mid-1917. Bacchante remained there for the rest of the war and was reduced to reserve in 1919 before being sold for scrap in 1920.

== Design and description ==
Bacchante was designed to displace 12,000 long tons (12,000 t). The ship had an overall length of 472 feet (143.9 m), a beam of 69 feet 9 inches (21.3 m) and a deep draught of 26 feet 9 inches (8.2 m). She was powered by two 4-cylinder triple-expansion steam engines, each driving one shaft, which produced a total of 21,000 indicated horsepower (15,660 kW) and gave a maximum speed of 21 knots (39 km/h; 24 mph). The engines were powered by 30 Belleville boilers. On their sea trials all of the Cressy-class cruisers, except the lead ship, exceeded their designed speed. She carried a maximum of 1,600 long tons (1,600 t) of coal and her complement ranged from 725 to 760 officers and ratings.

Her main armament consisted of two breech-loading (BL) 9.2-inch (234 mm) Mk X guns in single gun turrets, one each fore and aft of the superstructure. They fired 380-pound (170 kg) shells to a range of 15,500 yards (14,200 m). Her secondary armament of twelve BL 6-inch Mk VII guns was arranged in casemates amidships. Eight of these were mounted on the main deck and were only usable in calm weather. They had a maximum range of approximately 12,200 yards (11,200 m) with their 100-pound (45 kg) shells. A dozen quick-firing (QF) 12-pounder 12-cwt guns were fitted for defence against torpedo boats, eight on casemates on the upper deck and four in the superstructure. The ship also carried three 3-pounder Hotchkiss guns and two submerged 18-inch torpedo tubes.

The ship's waterline armour belt had a maximum thickness of 6 inches (152 mm) and was closed off by 5-inch (127 mm) transverse bulkheads. The armour of the gun turrets and their barbettes was 6 inches thick while the casemate armour was 5 inches thick. The protective deck armour ranged in thickness from 1–3 inches (25–76 mm) and the conning tower was protected by 12 inches (305 mm) of armour.

== Construction and service ==
Bacchante, named after the female devotees of the Greek god Bacchus, was laid down by John Brown & Company at their shipyard in Clydebank on 15 February 1899 and launched on 21 February 1901. She arrived at Chatham Dockyard the following October, to be equipped and prepared for her steam and gunnery trials and was completed in November 1902. Upon completion, she was commissioned by Captain Frederic Brock on 25 November 1902 and assigned to the Mediterranean Fleet as flagship of its cruiser squadron, replacing HMS Andromeda. On arrival in the Mediterranean, Brock changed places on 20 December with Captain Christopher Cradock, who had until then been in command of Andromeda. Bacchante remained in the Mediterranean under Cradock's command until 1905 when she returned home and was placed in reserve. She returned there in 1906 for service with the 3rd and later the 6th Cruiser Squadrons, and in January 1907 her command was given to William Ruck-Keene, who held it until October 1910.

The Census 1911 reveals her in the Mediterranean under the Flag of Rear Admiral Douglas Gamble and captained (Flag Captain) by Reginald Tyrwhitt. Gamble's Flag Lieutenant was Bertram Ramsay.

Upon returning home in 1912, the ship was assigned to the reserve Third Fleet.

At the outbreak of the war in August 1914, Bacchante became the flagship of the 7th Cruiser Squadron, tasked with patrolling the Broad Fourteens of the North Sea in support of a force of destroyers and submarines based at Harwich which protected the eastern end of the English Channel from German warships attempting to attack the supply route between England and France. During the Battle of Heligoland Bight on 28 August, the ship was flagship of Rear Admiral Henry Campbell commanding Cruiser Force 'C', in reserve off the Dutch coast, and saw no action. After the sinking of Bacchante's three sister ships while patrolling the Broad Fourteens on 22 September, she, and her sister Euryalus, were transferred to the 12th Cruiser Squadron to escort ships between England and Gibraltar in early October.

Bacchante and Euryalus were transferred to Egypt in late January 1915 to reinforce the defences of the Suez Canal although the Turkish raid on the Suez Canal had already been repulsed by the time that they arrived in February. By this time the preliminary bombardments of the Turkish defences of the Dardanelles had already occurred and the sisters were transferred north in March as the Turks east of the Canal proved to be reasonably quiet.

During the landing at Anzac Cove during the Battle of Gallipoli on 25 April, Bacchante suppressed Turkish artillery positions at Gaba Tepe after touching her bow the beach for a better position from which to engage the guns. She provided fire support for forces near Anzac Cove for the next several months, particularly during the Third attack on Anzac Cove on 19 May when she, together with three pre-dreadnought battleships, effectively suppressed the Turkish artillery assigned to support the attack. On 28 May Bacchante and the destroyer Kennet destroyed enemy shipping in Bodrum harbour. Three months later the cruiser bombarded Turkish troops during the Battle of Lone Pine on 6 August and Battle of Chunuk Bair 7–9 August. She was not present when the Allies began to evacuate Gallipoli in December, but her captain, Algernon Boyle, commanded the evacuation at Anzac Cove.

She remained in the Mediterranean until late 1916 when she returned home. She was damaged in a collision with the armoured cruiser Achilles in the Irish Sea in February 1917. After repairs she became flagship of the 9th Cruiser Squadron at Sierra Leone from April 1917 to November 1918. Bacchante was paid off at Chatham in April 1919 and sold for scrap on 1 July 1920.

== Bibliography ==
- Chesneau, Roger & Kolesnik, Eugene M., eds. (1979). Conway's All the World's Fighting Ships 1860–1905. Greenwich: Conway Maritime Press. ISBN 0-8317-0302-4.
- Corbett, Julian. Naval Operations to the Battle of the Falklands. History of the Great War: Based on Official Documents. Vol. I (2nd, reprint of the 1938 ed.). London and Nashville, Tennessee: Imperial War Museum and Battery Press. ISBN 0-89839-256-X.
- Corbett, Julian (1997). Naval Operations. History of the Great War: Based on Official Documents. Vol. II (reprint of the 1929 second ed.). London and Nashville, Tennessee: Imperial War Museum in association with the Battery Press. ISBN 1-870423-74-7.
- Corbett, Julian (1997). Naval Operations. History of the Great War: Based on Official Documents. Vol. III (reprint of the 1940 second ed.). London and Nashville, Tennessee: Imperial War Museum in association with the Battery Press. ISBN 1-870423-50-X.
- Friedman, Norman (2012). British Cruisers of the Victorian Era. Barnsley, South Yorkshire, UK: Seaforth. ISBN 978-1-59114-068-9.
- Friedman, Norman (2011). Naval Weapons of World War One. Barnsley, South Yorkshire, UK: Seaforth. ISBN 978-1-84832-100-7.
- Massie, Robert K. (2004). Castles of Steel: Britain, Germany, and the Winning of the Great War at Sea. London: Jonathan Cape. ISBN 0-224-04092-8.
- Silverstone, Paul H. (1984). Directory of the World's Capital Ships. New York: Hippocrene Books. ISBN 0-88254-979-0.
- Transcription of ship's logbooks June 1917 to April 1919
