= Geography of the North Sea =

The geography of the North Sea studies coastal and submarine features as well as the people who live on its coasts. It is bounded by the east coasts of England and Scotland to the west and the northern and central European mainland to the east and south, including Norway, Denmark, Germany, the Netherlands, Belgium, and France. In the south-west, beyond the Straits of Dover, the North Sea becomes the English Channel. In the east, it connects to the Baltic Sea via the Skagerrak and Kattegat, narrow straits that separate Denmark from Norway and Sweden respectively. In the north, it opens in a widening funnel shape to the Norwegian Sea, which lies in the very north-eastern part of the Atlantic.

== Extent ==
The International Hydrographic Organization defines the limits of the North Sea as follows:

On the Southwest. A line joining the Walde Lighthouse (France, 1°55'E) and Leathercoat Point (England, 51°10'N).

On the Northwest. From Dunnet Head (3°22'W) in Scotland to Tor Ness (58°47'N) in the Island of Hoy, thence through this island to the Kame of Hoy (58°55'N) on to Breck Ness on Mainland (58°58'N) through this island to Costa Head (3°14'W) and to Inga Ness (59'17'N) in Westray through Westray, to Bow Head, across to Mull Head (North point of Papa Westray) and on to Seal Skerry (North point of North Ronaldsay) and thence to Horse Island (South point of the Shetland Islands).

On the North. From the North point (Fethaland Point) of the Mainland of the Shetland Islands, across to Graveland Ness (60°39'N) in the Island of Yell, through Yell to Gloup Ness (1°04'W) and across to Spoo Ness (60°45'N) in Unst island, through Unst to Herma Ness (60°51'N), on to the SW point of the Rumblings and to Muckle Flugga (60°51′N 0°53′W) all these being included in the North Sea area; thence up the meridian of 0°53' West to the parallel of 61°00' North and eastward along this parallel to the coast of Norway, the whole of Viking Bank being thus included in the North Sea.

On the East. The Western limit of the Skagerrak [A line joining Hanstholm (57°07′N 8°36′E) and the Naze (Lindesnes, 58°N 7°E)].

== Submarine topography ==
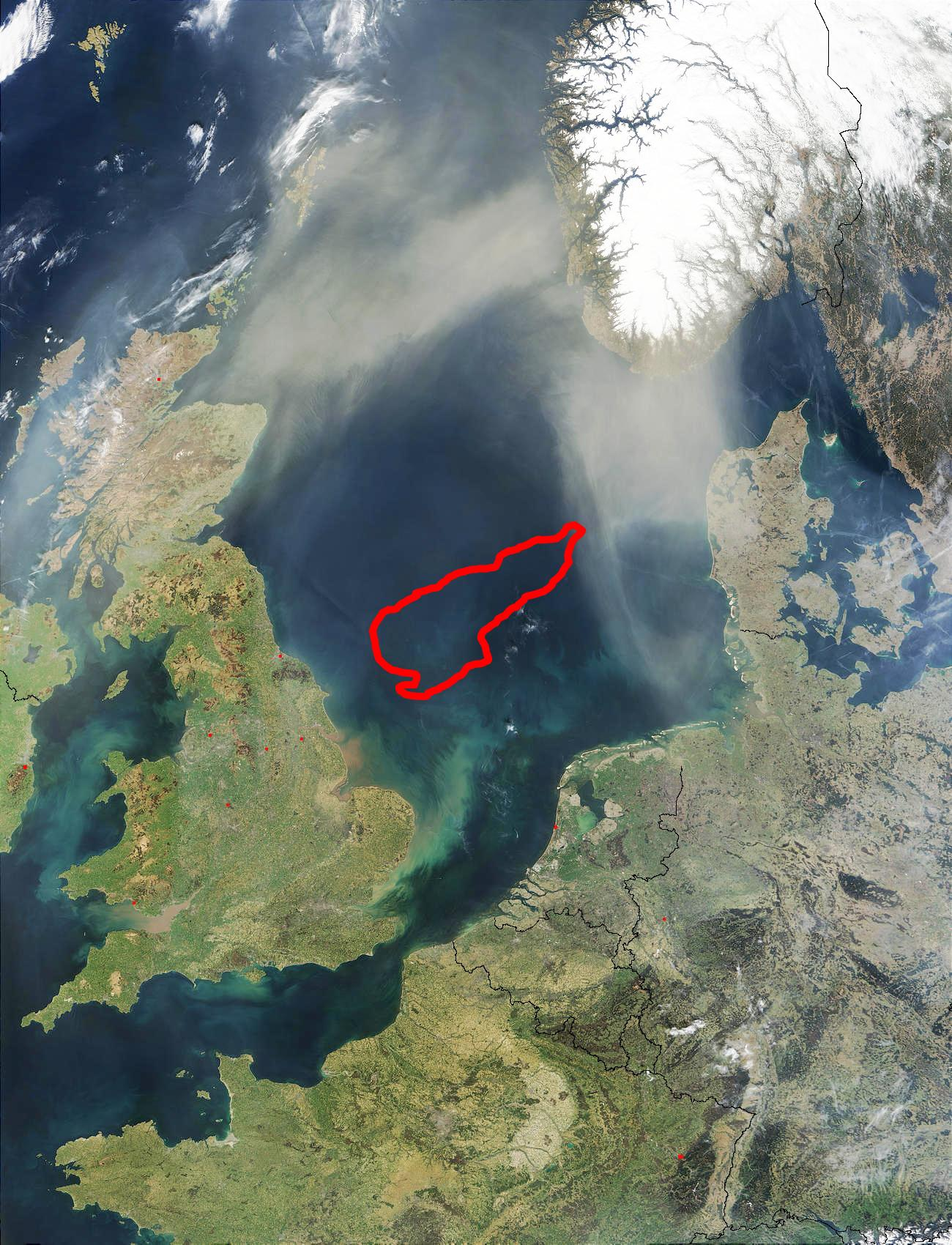
The Dogger Bank

The seabed is separated into three bathymetric areas, the Norwegian Trench and the north and south North Sea separated by the Dogger Bank. For the most part, the sea lies on the European continental shelf. The only exception is the Norwegian trench, which reaches from the Stad peninsula in Sogn og Fjordane to the Oslofjord. The trench is between 1 and 2 nautical miles (1.9 and 3.7 km; 1.2 and 2.3 mi) wide and hundreds of metres deep. Off the Rogaland coast, it is 250–300 m (820–980 ft) deep, and at its deepest point, off Arendal, it reaches 700 m (2,300 ft) deep as compared to the average depth of the North Sea, about 100 m (330 ft). The trench is not a subduction-related oceanic trench, where one tectonic plate is being forced under another. It is mainly a deep erosional scour, while the western part follows the north–south line of an old rift valley formed during the Jurassic and Cretaceous periods.

To the east of Great Britain, lies the Dogger Bank, a vast moraine, or accumulation of unconsolidated glacial debris, which rises up to 15 to 30 m (49 to 98 ft) deep.

The Silver Pit is a hollow or valley-like depression that has been recognised since about 1843 by fishermen. Nearby is the Silverpit crater, a controversial structure initially proposed to be an impact crater, though another interpretation is that it may result from the dissolution of a thick bed of salt which permitted the upper strata to collapse. The Devil's Hole is a group of trenches 200 kilometres (120 mi) east of Dundee, Scotland which are up to 230 metres (750 ft) deep. "The Long Forties" denotes a principal raised bank about 110 miles (180 km) in length that is between 35 and 40 fathoms (64 and 73 m) deep. It is located parallel to the shore of Scotland between Kinnaird's Head and Aberdeen. The Broad Fourteens are a sand bar ridge between eleven and fourteen fathoms (20 m and 26 m) deep located off the Flemish and Danish coasts.

== Coordinates ==
Geographical Features of the North Sea
Feature	Coordinates	Sources
Black Rock Ledge	50°49′0″N 0°6′0″W	
Brig Head	55°14′0″N 1°31′0″W	
Broad Fourteens (northeast)	53°30′N 0°3′E	
Broad Fourteens (southwest)	52°30′N 4°30′E.	
The Bush	55°37′0″N 1°38′0″W	
Coal Pit	53°29′0″N 1°46′0″E	
Cornelian Bay	54°9′0″N 0°13′0″W	
Cullercoats Bay	55°1′52.3″N 1°25′21.4″W	
Devil's Hole	57°0′0″N 1°0′0″E	
Dogger Bank	54°50′0″N 2°20′0″E	
Elm Bush	55°19′0″N 1°33′0″W	
Farne Islands	55°37′47.6″N 1°38′7.8″W	
Filey Bay	54°13′0″N 0°16′0″W	
Filey Brigg	54°12′34″N 0°15′20″W	
Firth of Forth	56°5′42″N 2°55′56″W	
Flamborough Head	54°06′41″N 00°04′37″W	
Flemish Banks - Blaamse Banken	51°17′16″N 2°38′28″E	
Frisian Front	53°42′0″N 4°30′0″E	
German Bight	54°12′56″N 8°4′5″E	
Gravelines	51°1′0″N 2°5′0″E	
Hadstone Carrs	55°18′0″N 1°33′0″W	
Hardangerfjords	59°57′0″N 5°49′48″E	
Helgoland Bight	54°10′46″N 8°22′20″E	
Inner Silver Pit	53°32′0″N 0°47′0″E	
Kelder Steel	54°31′0″N 0°40′0″W	
Long Forties	57°00′N 0°30′E	
Markham's Hole	54°50′0″N 2°35′0″E	
Moray Firth	58°0′0″N 3°0′0″W	
The Ness (Deer Sound)	58°53′02″N 2°52′08″W	
North Fourteens	53°30′00″N 0°3′0″E and 52°30′00″N 4°30′0″E	
Oosterschelde	51°33′38.9″N 3°57′10.3″E	
Orkney Isles	59°02′04″N 3°23′57″W	
Outer Silver Pit	54°0′0″N 2°0′0″E	
Robin Hood's Bay	54°25′0″N 0°31′0″W	
St. Andrews Bay	56°21′46.1″N 2°46′30.4″W	
Scheldt Estuary Netherlands	51°23′50″N 3°39′47″E	
Schouwen Bank crest Zeeland Banks	51°48′00″N 3°25′19″E	
Seal Skears	55°14′0″N 1°31′0″W	
The Scars	55°14′0″N 1°32′0″W	
Skate Hole	54°5′0″N 1°35′0″E	
Silver Pit Crater	54°14′0″N 1°51′0″E	
Sole Pit	53°39′0″N 1°32′0″E	
Southern Bight	51°33′40″N 3°1′15″E	
Thornton Ridge (northeast)	51°34′30″N 3°0′30″E	
Viking Bank	60°20′0″N 2°30′0″E	
Wadden Sea	54°26′32″N 8°38′3″E	
The Wash and North Norfolk Coast	52°56′13″N 00°19′05″E	
The Well	53°2′0″N 00°26′05″E	
Zeeland Banks De Kom swale	51°50′43″N 3°41′55″E	

== See also ==
- List of rivers discharging into the North Sea
- List of shoals and sandbanks in the southern North Sea
- Bell Rock Lighthouse
