= Geology of the North Sea =

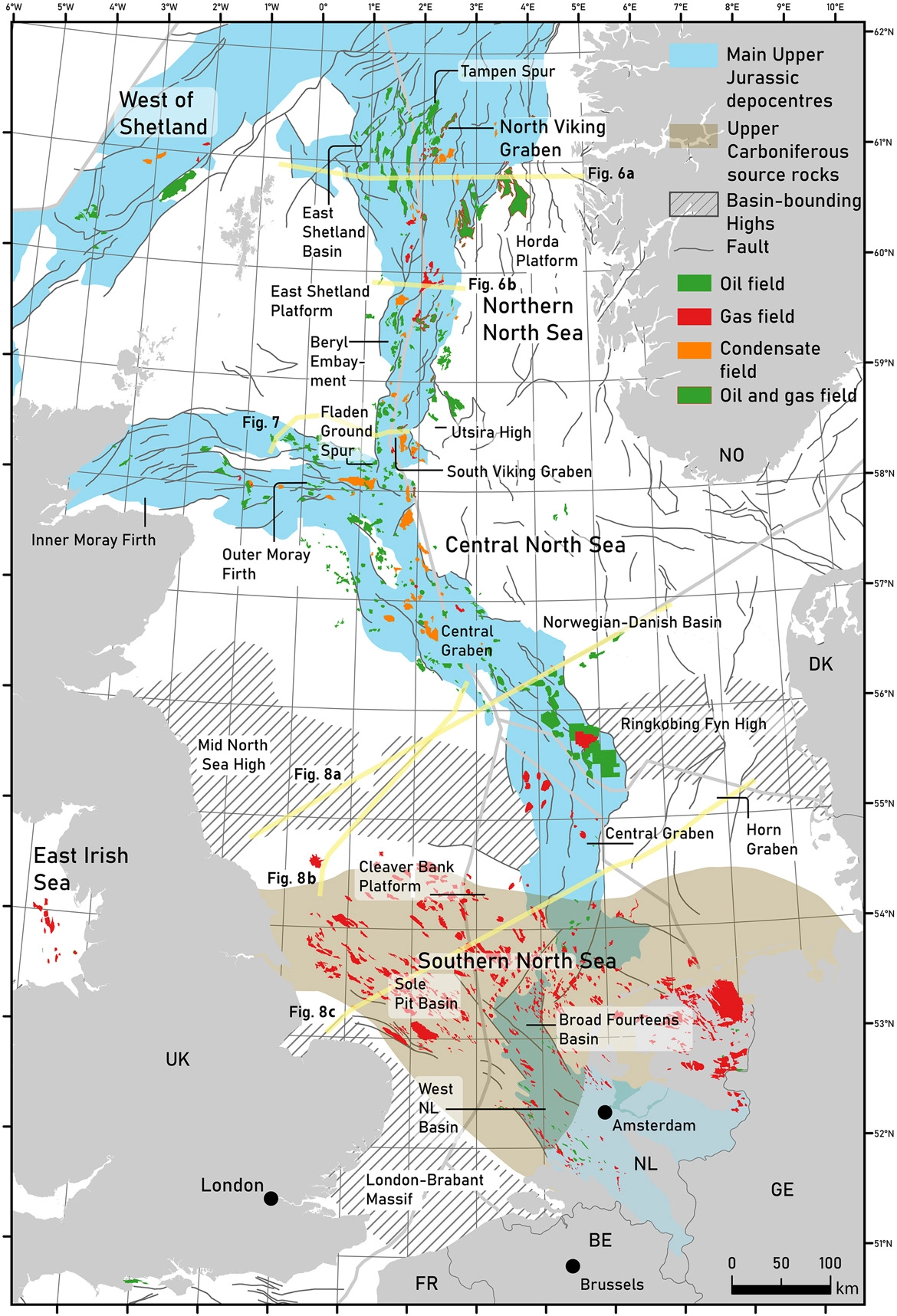

The geology of the North Sea describes the geological features such as channels, trenches, and ridges today and the geological history, plate tectonics, and geological events that created them.

The basement of the North Sea was formed in an intraplate setting during the Precambrian. Rigid blocks were overlaid with various depositions, sands and salts. These rigid blocks were transformed to a metamorphic base due to tectonic processes such as continental collisions which cause horizontal pressure, friction and distortion in the Caledonian plate cycle as well as the Variscan plate cycle. The blocks were also subjected to metamorphic evolution during the Triassic and Jurassic periods when the rock was heated up by the intrusion of hot molten rock called magma from the Earth's interior.

The Caledonian (Iapetus) plate cycle saw the formation of the Iapetus suture during the Caledonian orogeny. The Iapetus suture was a major weakness creating a volcanic fault in the central North Sea during the later Jurassic period. The Iapetus ocean was replaced with a suture line and mountain range when Laurentia, Baltica and Avalonia continents collided. This collision formed Laurussia.

The Variscan (Rheic) plate cycle resulted in the formation of Pangaea when Gondwana and Laurussia collided. The elimination of the Rheic Ocean caused the formation of a massive mountain range through the border countries of the present day North Sea.

Triassic and Jurassic volcanic rifting and graben fault systems created highs and lows in the North Sea area. This was followed by late Mesozoic and Cenozoic subsidence creating the intracratonic sedimentary basin of the North Sea. This era experienced higher sea levels because of sea floor spreading, cooler lithosphere temperatures. Plate tectonics and continental orogenies combined to create the continents and the North Sea as we know them today. The final events affecting the North Sea coastline features and submarine topography occurred in the Cenozoic era.

== Tectonic structure ==
The Mesozoic structures underneath the North Sea can be seen as a failed rift system. After initial crustal extension and the formation of rift basins during the Triassic and Jurassic periods, the extension concentrated on the other side of the British Isles, which would create the northern Atlantic Ocean. The rift basins even saw some inversion during the late Cretaceous and Eocene epochs. From the Oligocene onward, tensions in the European crust caused by the Alpine orogeny to the south cause a new, more modest phase of extension. Some grabens in the area are still active.

The subsurface of the North Sea area is dominated by grabens: the north-west south-east oriented Lower Rhine Graben under the southern North Sea and the Netherlands, the north–south-oriented North Sea Central Graben that begins north of the Dutch coast and ends in the region east of Scotland, and the Viking Graben along the south-east Norwegian coast. The Horn Graben is a smaller graben east of the Central Graben and in front of the Danish coast. Another smaller structure is known as the Terschelling Graben, which borders the Central Graben in the west, just north of the Netherlands. A larger graben is found in the subsurface below the Skagerrak, this north–south structure is called the Bamble-Oslo Graben. The Viking Graben is separated from the Faeroe Shetland Basin below the Atlantic by the Shetland Platform, the two structures join in the area north-east of the Shetland Islands.

== Geologic history ==
=== Precambrian ===
The area we now call the North Sea was interspersed amid several separate continental areas (Siberia, Baltica, Gondwana, and Laurentia) as well as the Iapetus Ocean and Tornquist Sea. Plate tectonics and continental collisions (orogenies) brought the features together of the North Sea that we recognise presently.

=== Paleozoic orogenies ===
==== Finnmarkian, Athollian, Caledonian orogenies ====
Euramerica showing the Caledonian orogeny

The branches of the Caledonian/Acadian belts at the end of the Caledonian orogeny (Early Devonian). Present-day coastlines are in gray. (Note: Later in geological history, the Atlantic Ocean opened and the parts of the orogenic belt moved apart. Reconstruction based on Matte (2001); Stampfli et al. (2002); Torsvik et al. (1996) and Ziegler (1990))

The Finnmarkian orogeny affected northern Norway in the early Palaeozoic era. In the late Ordovician period, Avalonia collided with Baltica creating the Tornquist Margin. This corresponds to the suture of the north German-Polish Caledonides. By the end of the Ordovician the Tornquist Sea had been eliminated. The Tornquist-Tesseyre fault system also had its beginnings in the orogeny closing the Tornquist Sea. Baltica subducted below Avalonia.

The Atthollian Orogeny was a collision between the Scottish Highlands and a Midland Valley area which very likely created the Highland Boundary Fault.

During the late Silurian period Baltica then collided with Laurentia which is named the Scandian phase of the Caledonian Orogeny. Baltica was subducted below Laurentia forming the Caledonian Belt. The Caledonian Orogeny caused the closure of the Iapetus Ocean when the continents and terranes of Laurentia, Baltica and Avalonia collided. The combined mass of the three continents formed a "new" continent: Laurussia or Euramerica. The Caledonian orogeny encompasses events that occurred from the Ordovician to Early Devonian, roughly 490–390 Ma. The basement formations of the North Sea were roughly formed during this Caledonian geosynclinal stage of the Cambrian – Devonian periods. The Caledonian mountains range helped create the 'Old Red Sandstone' continent at the joining of the tectonic plates. The Rheic Ocean began to open to the south.

==== Acadian Orogeny ====
The Acadian orogeny occurred in the Lower Devonian period (Paleozoic era), about 500 Ma. The continents of Laurentia and Baltica collided. The Iapetus Ocean disappeared under this continental collision. These plate tectonic forces built up a mountain range extending from what is now termed the Adirondacks north through Nova Scotia, the British Isles, Norway and the eastern margin of Greenland. Greenland and Scandinavia were situated at the amid the equator and mid tropics (20 to 20 degrees north). The area now comprising Greenland-Scandinavia-British Isles began drifting northward in the Late Carboniferous-Early Permian period. A high amount of volatile magmatism caused dikes parallel to the Tornquist Margin which were formative areas of the North Sea – British Isles -Germany – southwest Sweden area.

The continents after the Caledonian orogeny (Devonian to Permian times). (Note: Differences in fossil faunas astride the red line (the Iapetus suture) show that an ocean was between the two sides before the continents were joined in the supercontinent Pangaea. Figure based on Windley (1996) and Ziegler (1990))

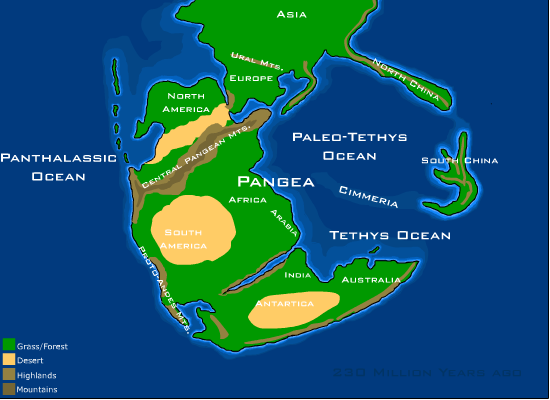
Pangaea 230 ma

==== Variscan Orogeny ====
The Rheic Ocean or Proto-Tethys Ocean was eliminated during the Hercynian/Variscan orogeny, and the Pangaea supercontinent formed. The continents of Gondwana and Laurussia collided, both were drifting north, however Gondwana was drifting at a faster rate. The mountain range which was created extended along Spain, Brittany, central Germany and into Poland. The closure of the Rheic Ocean in the late Carboniferous formed thrusts in southern England.

The Pangaea supercontinent was added to in the late Permian period when Siberia collided with Baltica and Kazakhstan. Pangaea was surrounded by massive subduction plate tectonics. The North Sea area was central to the continental Pangaea supercontinent. In this period the area now named the North Sea was in the subtropics and was a non-marine arid environment.

=== Permo–Triassic rifting and thermal subsidence ===
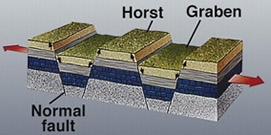
A graben fault system typical of the Viking graben and Central graben

During the Triassic period, the Viking and Central Graben volcanic systems were formed. Upward thrusting rifts were formed during the Triassic comprising the taphrogenic stage. The Atlantic rift zone is associated with the North Sea rifts zone.

"Rift basins share similar characteristics and histories, one that is conducive to evaporite deposition. They typically form during extension of the earth's crust with a distinct basement architecture made up of grabens and half-grabens segmented by transverse structures. Salt deposition can be restricted to individual half-grabens or deposited regionally depending upon the rift geometry, sedimentation rates, and time of evaporite formation."

— Dr. Rowan

The Triassic saw active crustal stretching via the rifting process, lower sea levels and volcanic activity.

=== Jurassic ===
As the Jurassic (200–145 Ma) started, Pangaea began to break up into two continents, Gondwana and Laurasia. At this time sea levels rose. The burial of algae and bacteria below the mud of the sea floor during this time resulted in the formation of North Sea oil and natural gas, much of it trapped in overlying sandstone by deposits formed as the seas fell to form the swamps and salty lakes and lagoons that were home to dinosaurs.

==== Middle Jurassic domal uplift ====
Volcanism and a rift system developed in the central North Sea area where basaltic lavas were extruded. The mantle warped upwards creating a dome in the middle of the North Sea where the Iapetus Suture intersected the Tornquist-Teisseyre fault system. The dome area was amidst the Viking Graben, Central Graben and Moray Firth Basin. The Scotland rifting and the extrusive centre of the Forties were associated with the uplifted area. The Long Forties and Horda Basin were also volcanic centres. During this time the sea level fell. Major reservoirs were created in the North Sea during this time as clastics and sands were deposited in paralic environments.

=== Cretaceous period sea floor spreading ===
During the cretaceous the main rift expansion was in an east and west direction. There are two basins the large South Permian Basin, and the smaller Northern Permian basin, which are east–west trending. The basins are separated by the Ringkøbing-Fyn system of highs. The Viking Graben lies between the Shetland Platform and the Fenno-Scandian high. The Central Graben lies amid the Permian basins and their high. The formation of these has been influenced by the zig zag suture line of the Caledonian orogeny with its areas of crustal tension weakness. Sea floor expansion continues, and sea levels rise. The sea level is 100 meters (330 ft) to 200 meters (660 ft) higher than present day levels.

In northwestern Europe, chalk deposits from the Upper Cretaceous are characteristic for the Chalk Group, which forms the white cliffs of Dover on the south coast of England and similar cliffs on the French Normandian coast. The group is found in England, northern France, the Low Countries, northern Germany, Denmark and in the subsurface of the southern part of the North Sea. Stagnation of deep sea currents in middle Cretaceous times caused anoxic circumstances in the sea water. In many places around the world, dark anoxic shales were formed during this interval. These shales are an important source rock for oil and gas, for example in the subsurface of the North Sea. Across the north central and northern North Sea, the Chalk Group is a major seal unit, overlying a number of blocks of reservoir rocks and preventing their fluid contents from migrating upwards.

The Silverpit crater, a 20 kilometers (12 mi) diameter suspected impact crater in the North Sea (60–65 Ma). The age of the feature is constrained between 74 – 45 million years (Late Cretaceous – Eocene). The Sole Pit Basin was created by deep burial of depocentres.

=== Cenozoic era intracratonic basin formation ===
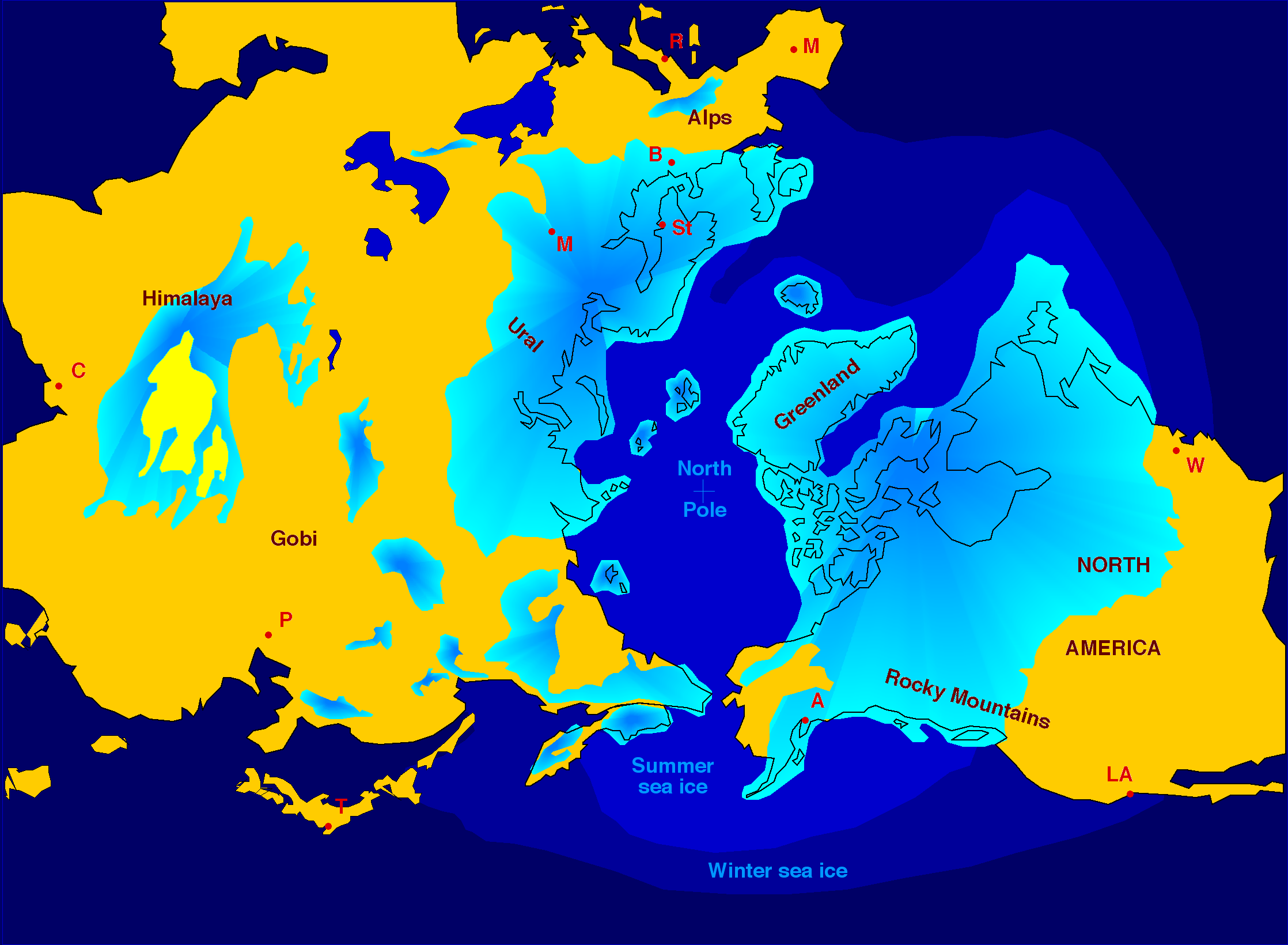
Northern hemisphere glaciation during the last ice ages. (Note: Northern hemisphere glaciation during the last ice ages. The accumulation of 3 kilometers (1.9 mi) to 4 kilometers (2.5 mi) thick ice sheets caused a sea level lowering of about 120 meters (390 ft). Also, the Alps and the Himalayas were covered by glaciers. Winter sea ice coverage was much more limited in the south.)

Geologically, the Cenozoic is the era when the continents moved into their current positions. The Alpine Orogeny, the spreading of the Mid Atlantic ridge, and the creation of the Atlantic Ocean basin occurred in the Cenozoic era. The Iceland hot spot and North Atlantic rifting helped to exhume the British Isles. In the early Palaeogene period (Caenozoic Era) between 63 and 52 Ma, the North Sea formed, and Britain was uplifted. Some of this uplift was along old lines of weakness from the Caledonian and Variscan Orogenies long before.

The post rift phase followed late Jurassic rift events during the late Mesozoic and Cenozoic thermal subsidence. As the rifting stopped, then regional subsidence occurred creating an intracratonic sedimentary basin. Subsidence occurred due to lithosphere cooling. Some of this uplift was along old lines of weakness from the Caledonian and Variscan Orogenies long before. Intraplate compression was caused when the Atlantic Ocean basin formed. the Mid-Atlantic spreading ridge has been busy separating east from west. Greenland separated from North America and the rifting altered direction during the Paleogene, which caused Northern Europe to separate from Greenland. During the Eocene period, the last land bridge across the Atlantic sank.

The Alpine Orogeny that occurred about 50 Ma was responsible for the shaping of the London Basin syncline and the Weald anticline to the south. The eastern end of the London Basin merges with the basin of the North Sea, extending on land along the north Kent coast to Reculver and up the east coast of Essex and into Suffolk, where it is overlain by Pleistocene 'Crag' deposits which cover much of eastern Suffolk and Norfolk and are better considered as part of the North Sea basin.

In the Miocene and Pliocene epochs of the Neogene period, further uplift and erosion occurred, particularly in the Pennines. Plant and animal types developed into their modern forms, and by about 2 Ma the landscape would have been broadly recognisable today.

==== Quaternary glaciations ====
The Pleistocene saw the sea retreat from the basin as global sea-level fell due to accumulation of ice sheets. The major changes during the Pleistocene epoch have been brought about by several recent ice ages. (Note: Pleistocene: Ice age 72k-12k BP; Ice age glaciation locally called: Wisconsin (in North America) Devensian (in the British Isles) Midlandian (in Ireland) Würm (in the Alps) Weichsel (in northern central Europe); Interglacial 131k-115k BP Sangamonian Stage in North America Ipswichian interglacial in the UK Riss-Würm interglacial in the Alps; It began about 131,000 years ago. The warmest peak of the Eemian was around 125,000 years ago, when forests reached as far north as North Cape (which is now tundra) in northern Norway. Sea levels at that time were 5–8 meters higher than they are now, possibly indicating greater deglaciation than today (mostly from partial melting of the ice sheet of Greenland). The era quickly cooled to conditions cooler and drier than the present, and by 114,000 years ago, a glacial era had returned.: Ice age 200k-125k BP; Ice age glaciation locally called: Wolstonian glaciation (in the British Isles) Illinoian Stage in the US Warthe glaciation and Saalian glaciation in northern Europe Riss glaciation in the Alps; Interglacial 300k-200k BP; Interglacial locally called: Hoxnian interglacial in the UK Pre-Illinoian Stage in North America Holstein interglacial in northern Europe Mindel-Riss interglacial in the Alps; It began about 300,000 ago and ended 200,000 years ago.: Ice age 410k-380k BP; Ice age glaciation locally called: Pre-Illinoian Stage in North America Anglian glaciation in UK Elster glaciation in northern Europe Mindel glaciation in the Alps; Interglacial 600k-450k BP; Interglacial locally called: Cromerian interglacial in the UK Pre-Illinoian Stage in North America Günz-Mindel interglacial in the Alps; It began about 600,000 ago and ended 450,000 years ago.) During glaciation, water was taken from the oceans to form the ice at high latitudes, causing global sea level to drop by about 120 meters, exposing the continental shelves and forming land-bridges between land-masses for animals to migrate. During deglaciation, the melted ice-water returned to the oceans, causing sea level to rise. This process can cause sudden shifts in coastlines and hydration systems resulting in newly submerged lands, emerging lands, collapsed ice dams resulting in salination of lakes, new ice dams creating vast areas of freshwater, and a general alteration in regional weather patterns on a large but temporary scale. It can even cause temporary reglaciation. This type of chaotic pattern of rapidly changing land, ice, saltwater and freshwater has been proposed as the likely model for the Baltic and Scandinavian regions, as well as much of central North America at the end of the Last Glacial Maximum LGM, with the present-day coastlines only being achieved in the last few millennia of prehistory. Also, the effect of elevation on Scandinavia submerged a vast continental plain that had existed under much of what is now the North Sea, connecting the British Isles to Continental Europe.

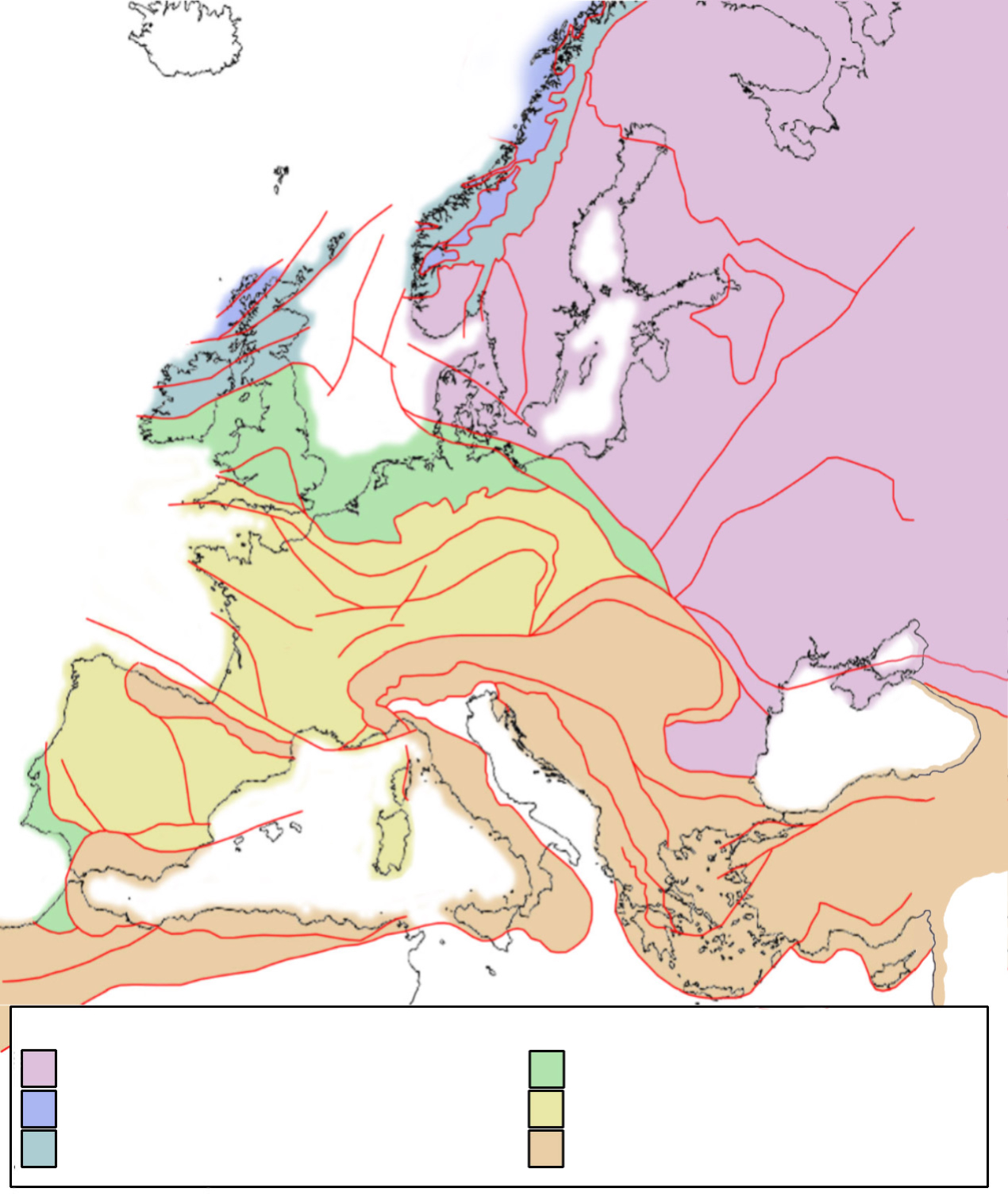

At one time there was land where the strait is now, a south-east extension of the Weald joining what is now Great Britain to continental Europe. The Strait of Dover opened during the Ice Age, as described below; as a result the British Isles have now become islands not connected with continental Europe any longer. The English Channel was formed by erosion caused by two major floods. The first was about 425,000 years ago, when an ice-dammed lake in the southern North Sea overflowed and broke the Weald-Artois chalk range in a catastrophic erosion and flood event. Afterwards, the Thames and Scheldt flowed through the gap into the English Channel, but the Meuse and Rhine still flowed northwards. In a second flood about 225,000 years ago the Meuse and Rhine were ice-dammed into a lake that broke catastrophically through a high weak barrier (perhaps chalk, or end-moraines left by the ice sheet). Both floods cut massive flood channels in the dry bed of the English Channel, somewhat like the Channeled Scablands in the USA.

Glaciation had an enormous impact on the coastline of the North Sea. The west coast of Denmark is notable as it had been very glaciated during the Saale Glacial Stage and Weichselian glaciation. As the sea levels fell in the Holocene epoch, Denmark's north coast gave way to raised spits, beach ridges and cliffs.

During the glacial maximum in Scandinavia regionally referred to as the Weichsel glaciation, only the western parts of Jutland were ice-free, and a large part of what is today the North Sea was dry land connecting Jutland with Britain. It is also in Denmark that the only Scandinavian ice-age animals older than 13,000 BC are found. In the period following the last interglacial before the current one (Eemian Stage), the coast of Norway was also ice-free. The Baltic Sea, with its unique brackish water, is a result of meltwater from the Weichsel glaciation combining with saltwater from the North Sea when the straits between Sweden and Denmark opened. The North Sea produces fossils from every period of the Pleistocene. The area was a dry steppe landscape, overlain with rivers, where animals such as the elephant-like mastodon, scimitar cat, southern mammoth, hippopotamus, horses, bears and giant deer lived. They were flooded at the close of the last Ice Age.

== Geologic timeline ==
The following five timelines show the geologic time scale to scale. The first shows the entire time from the formation of Earth to the present, but this gives little space for the most recent eon. The second timeline shows an expanded view of the most recent eon. In a similar way, the most recent era is expanded in the third timeline, the most recent period is expanded in the fourth timeline, and the most recent epoch is expanded in the fifth timeline.

(Horizontal scale is millions of years for the above timelines; thousands of years for the timeline below)

== Maps ==
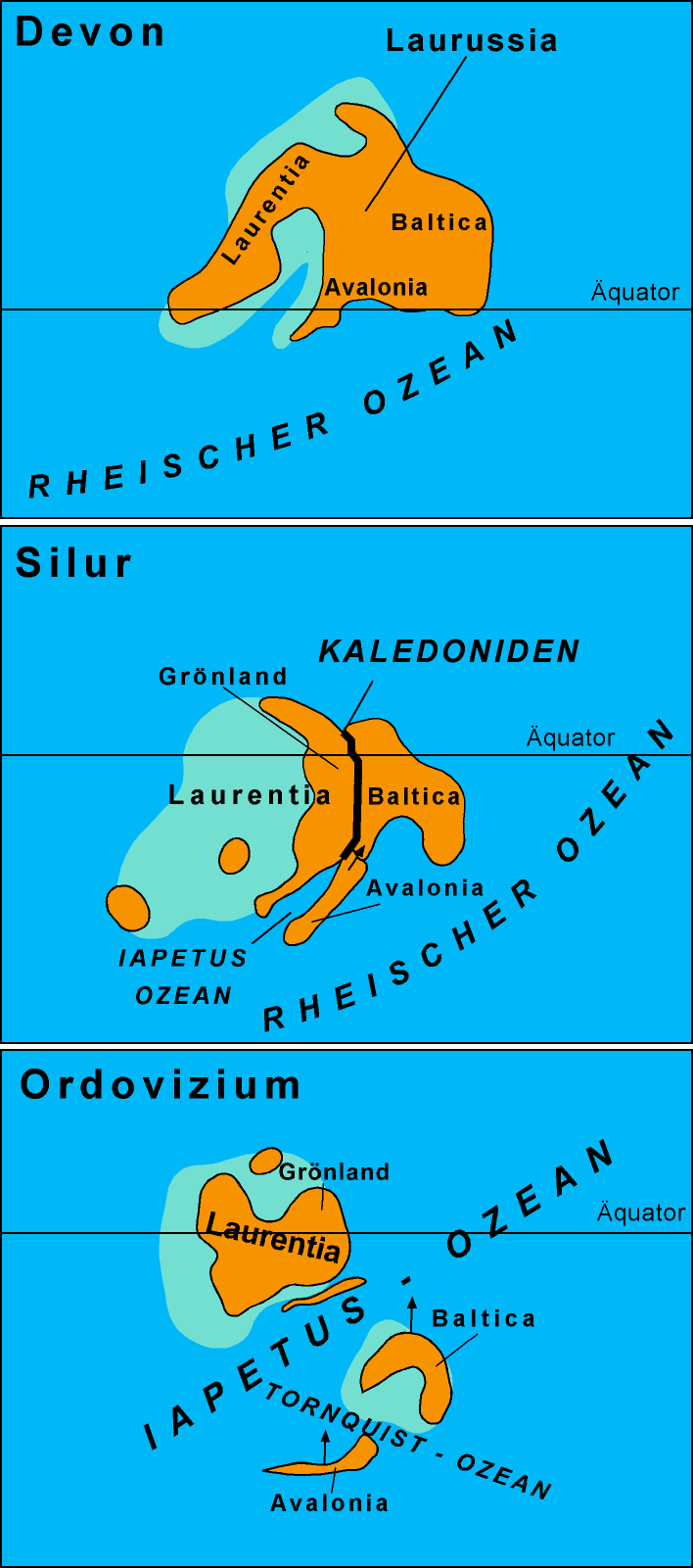
Relative positions of the terranes and continental plates at various stages in the Ordovician, Silurian and Devonian respectively. The names shown are in their German forms.

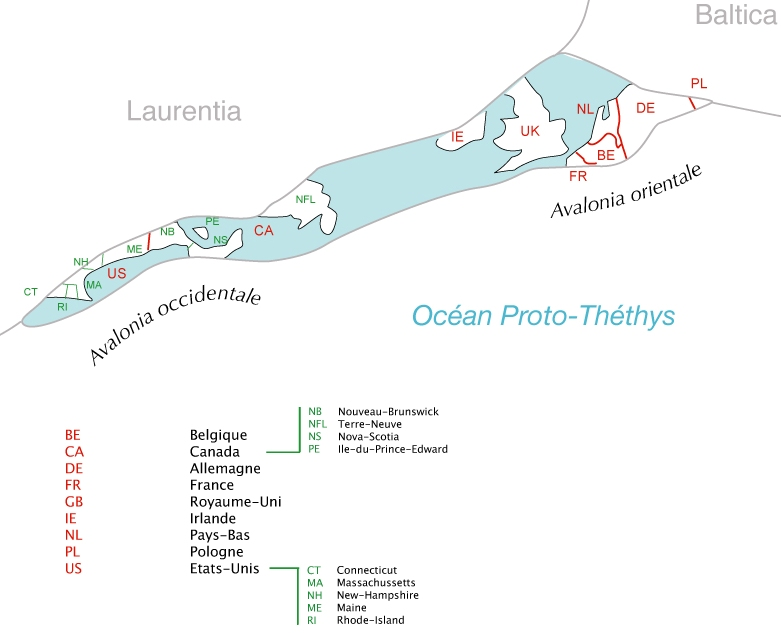
Collision of Avalonia, Baltica and Laurentia. The names are shown in French.

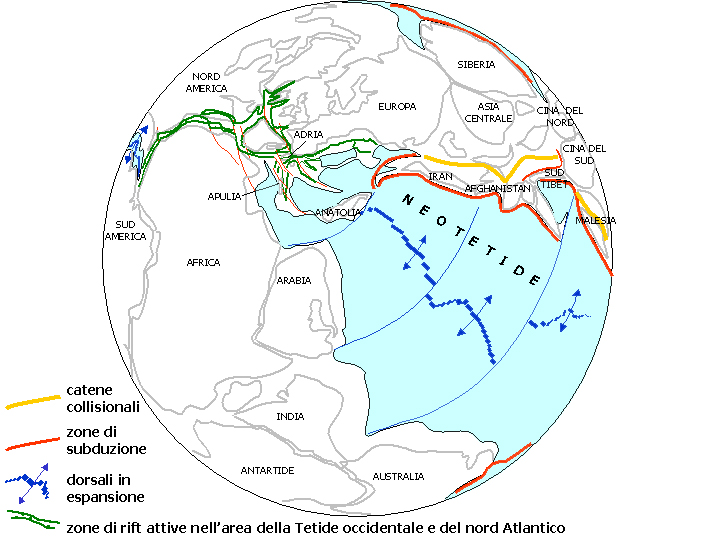
Rifting zones in the Triassic period. The names shown are in Italian.

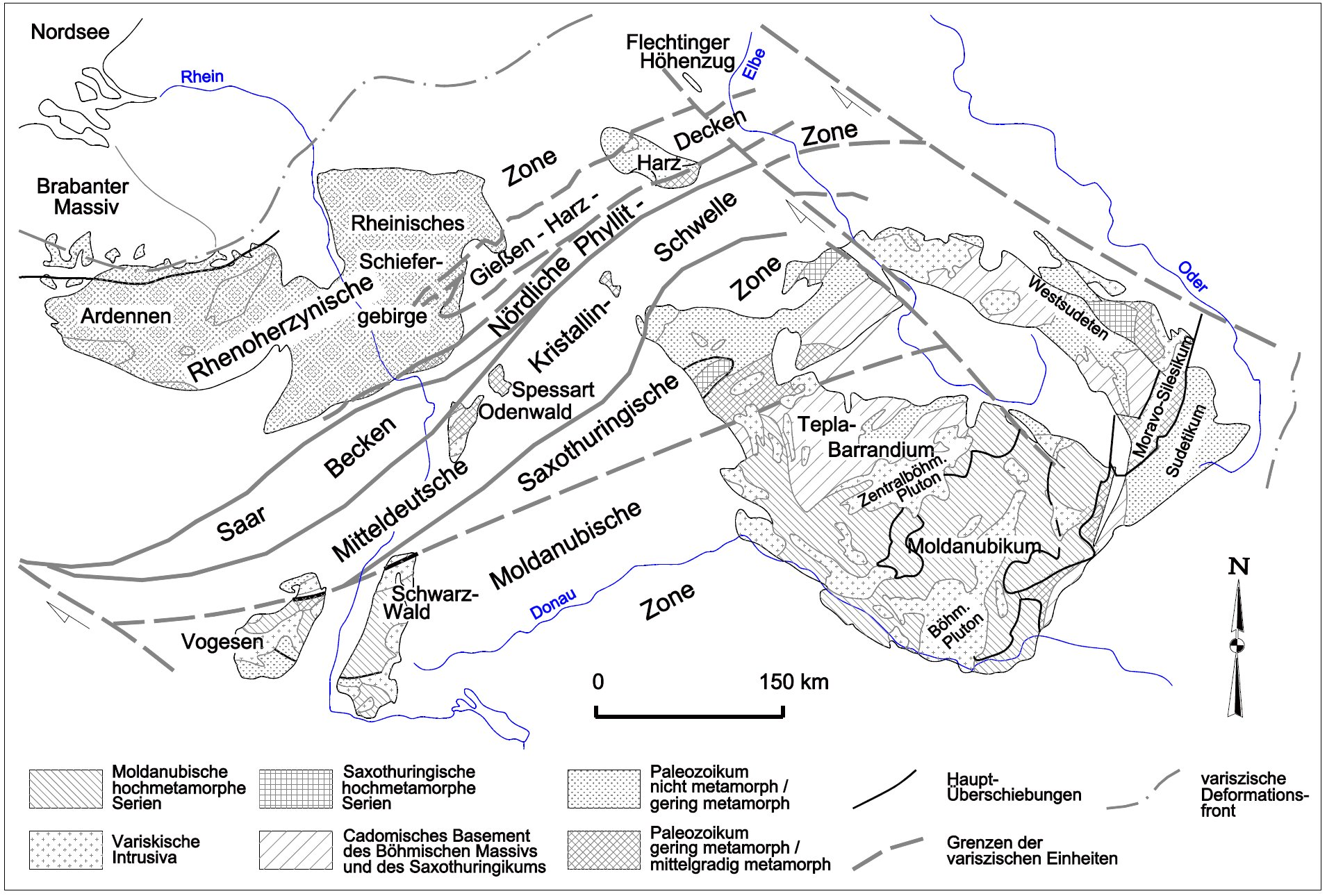
Transformation of a magmatic arc and an orogenic root during oblique collision; the precollisional subduction erosion in ancient collisional belts: The case of the Mid-European Variscides. The names shown are in their German forms.

== See also ==
- Armorican Massif
- Cretaceous–Paleogene extinction event
- Geologic time scale
- Geology of the British Isles
- Geology of the Netherlands
- Geology of Norway
- Geology of southern North Sea
- Giessen nappe
- Great Glen Fault
- Highland Boundary Fault
- London-Brabant Massif
- Mulciber (volcano)
- Oslo Graben
- Rhenish Massif
- Saxothuringian Zone
- Silverpit crater
- Zuidwal volcano
