= Western Approaches =

Region of northwestern Atlantic Ocean

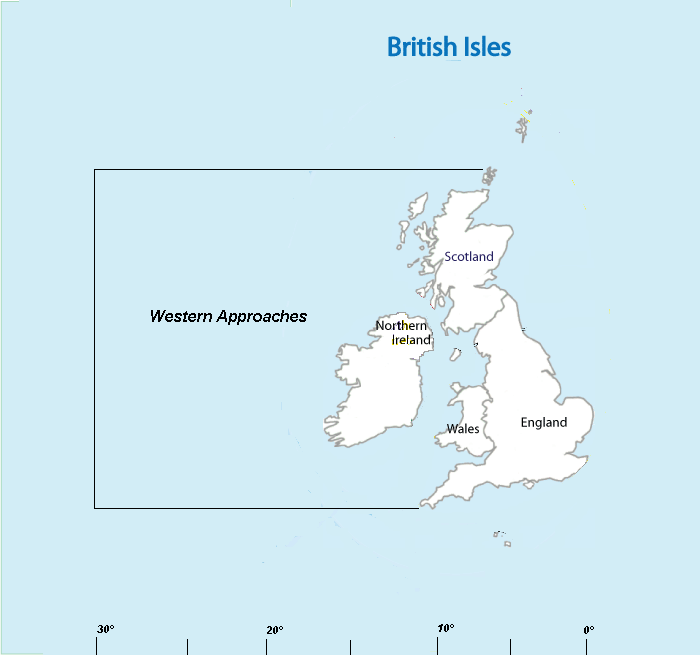
Western Approaches

The Western Approaches is an approximately rectangular area of the Atlantic Ocean lying immediately to the west of Ireland and parts of Great Britain. Its north and south boundaries are defined by the corresponding extremities of Britain. The coast of the mainland forms the eastern side and the western boundary is the 30 degree meridian, which passes through Iceland. The area is particularly important to the United Kingdom, because many of its larger shipping ports lie within it.

The term is most commonly used when discussing naval warfare, notably during the Napoleonic Wars, the First World War and the Battle of the Atlantic during the Second World War in which Nazi Germany's Kriegsmarine attempted to blockade the United Kingdom using submarines (U-boats) operating in this area. Since almost all shipping to and from the United Kingdom passed through this area, it was an excellent hunting ground and had to be heavily defended.

== See also ==
- Irish Sea
- GIUK gap
- Long Forties
- Broad Fourteens
- Western Approaches Command
- Denys Rayner
