= Devils Hole (disambiguation) =

Devils Hole is a cave in Ash Meadows National Wildlife Refuge, Nevada, United States.

Devils Hole may also refer to:

- Devil's Hole (North Sea), a group of deep trenches in the North Sea
- Devil's Hole, Bermuda, a sinkhole in Harrington Sound, Bermuda
- Devil's Hole State Park, a protected area in New York, United States
- Devil's Hole, a blowhole in Saint Mary, Jersey in the Channel Islands
- Devil's Hole, a steep valley on Winders Hill on the North Downs Way, near Caterham, Surrey UK
- Trou du Diable, a cave in St-Casimir, Quebec, Canada

== See also ==
- Devil's Cave (disambiguation)
