= Oasis Impact Structure =

Impact structure in Libya

Coordinates: 24°34′28″N 24°24′37″E

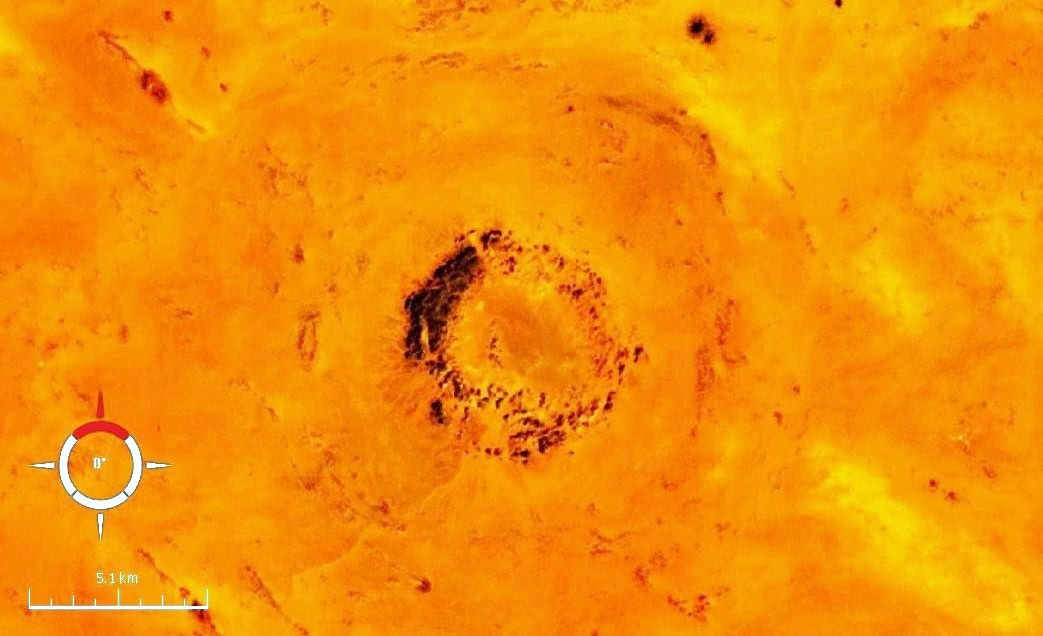
- Landsat image of the Oasis crater; screen capture from NASA World Wind

- Location within Libya
- Location: Libya

Impact crater structure
- Confidence: Confirmed
- Diameter: 18 kilometres (11 mi)
- Age: <120 Ma
- Exposed: Yes
- Drilled: No

Oasis Impact Structure is a deeply eroded impact structure that is located 80 km (50 mi) south of the BP Impact Structure in southwest Libya. The associated impact crater has been entirely destroyed by erosion. The most prominent topographic expression of the Oasis Impact Structure is a single, discontinuous ring of hills that is 5.1 km (3.2 mi) in diameter and 100 m (330 ft) high. Based upon the interpretation of radar images, the diameter of the Oasis Impact Structure is estimated to be approximately 18 km (11 mi). A mantle of desert sand largely blankets and obscures the outer edge of this impact structure. The deformed strata of the Oasis Impact Structure consist of sedimentary rocks.

== History ==
Kohman and others first recognized the Oasis Impact Structure, along with the BP Impact Structure, in 1967 using space and aerial photography. The same year, W. M. Johnson identified both features as potential impact structures while using aerial photography to prepare geological maps of the Gebel Dalma area of Southern Cyrenaica in Libya. The Oasis Impact Structure was named after the Oasis Oil Company of Libya. Without supporting evidence, it has been speculated that the Oasis Impact Structure formed the same time as the BP Impact Structure as the result of a double extraterrestrial impact. In the early 1970s, B. M. French, J. R. Underwood, Jr, and others confirmed the impact origin of the BP Structure as the result of more detailed, field studies.

== Description ==
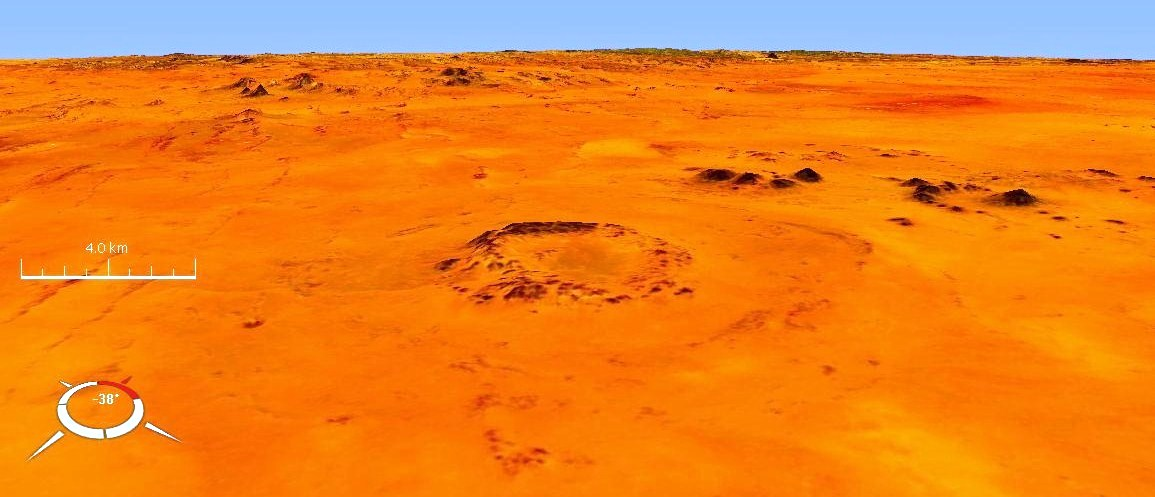
Oblique Landsat image of Oasis Impact Structure draped over digital elevation model (x5 vertical exaggeration); screen capture from NASA World Wind

The Oasis Impact Structure is a circular feature consisting of highly disturbed bedrock associated with a prominent ring of discontinuous of hills. These hills rise about 100 m (330 ft) above the surrounding flat desert and form a ring with a diameter of 5.1 km (3.2 mi). Unlike the BP Impact Structure, the Oasis Impact Structure lacks a central peak.

Initially, the diameter of the Oasis Impact Structure was estimated to be 11.5 km (7.1 mi) based on the extent of disturbed strata as mapped in the field. More recently in 2017, Van Gasselt and others proposed it had a diameter of between 15.1 and 16.1 km (9.4 and 10.0 mi) based on the interpretation of high-resolution radar imagery and aerial photographs. Finally, the use of NASA Space Shuttle radar to map disturbed strata covered by a thin veneer of sand extended the diameter of this impact structure to 18 km (11 mi).

The topography of the Oasis Impact Structure reflects differences in its bedrock. The inner ring of hills consists of relatively resistant early Cretaceous sandstones of the Nubian Sandstone. These sandstones are intensely folded and some beds may be vertical or overturned. The plains surrounding the inner hills and the innermost depression are underlain by undifferentiated Carboniferous sedimentary rocks.

== Shock metamorphism ==
French and others argue that both the Oasis and BP structures are impact structures. This conclusion is based on their: (1) geometry, (2) style of deformation, and (3) indications of the high-pressure shock metamorphism of quartz grains. At both structures, they found a lack of meteorite fragments, shatter cones, megascopic breccia, Ne-Fe spherules, impact melt, or impact glass. The lack of these features can be explained by the depth of erosion of both structures.

French and others first reported evidence of shock metamorphism associated with the Oasis Impact Structure. They found the presence of shocked quartz in samples of microbreccia within the inner ring of hills. Some grains of the shocked quartz that they examined exhibited up to six sets of planar deformation features. later in 2010, Gibson and others also reported the presence of shocked quartz exhibiting up four sets of planar deformation features from samples from the inner ring of hills and planar features from samples collected about 8 km (5.0 mi) from the center of the Oasis Impact Structure. Within the Oasis Impact Structure, several types of impact breccia have been found. The most common type of breccia consists of a white, massive, fine-grained sandstone.

The sandstones of the central parts of the Oasis Impact Structure contains nodules of kaolinite, iron, and manganese and chert. The age of these nodules is undetermined. It is unknown if these nodules reflect an impact-induced hydrothermal system or preexisting conditions.

== Age ==
Rocks and minerals appropriate for the use of radiometric dating are absent from the BP and Oasis Impact Structures. As a result, the absolute age of both impact structures is unknown. In the absence of datable rocks and minerals, the maximum age of both structures is estimated on the assumed age of the Nubian sandstone being about 90–120 million years old. Based on the similar degree of erosion, it has been speculated that the BP and Oasis Impact Structures are of similar age and possibly the result of a double impact.

== Libyan desert glass ==
Beginning with their discovery, the B.P. and Oasis impact structures have been considered possible candidates for being the source of the Libyan desert glass. Chemical analyses of rock samples from the B.P. and Oasis structures show that they are similar enough to the composition of the Libyan desert glass to be the source of it. However, more recent trace element studies do not support the hypothesis that the Nubian sedimentary rocks associated with either the BP or Oasis structures are the source of the Libyan desert glass.

== See also ==
- Silverpit crater
