= Mulciber (volcano) =

Extinct volcano in the North Sea

- Location within North Sea

Highest point
- Coordinates: 54°3′38″N 4°16′55″E

Naming
- Native name: Mulciber (Dutch)

Geology
- Mountain type: Extinct
- Last eruption: Late Jurassic

Mulciber is an extinct volcano on the Dutch part of the North Sea, about 100 km Northwest of Terschelling.

== History ==
Mulciber was active in the Late Jurassic, about 150 million years ago, the same period in which the Zuidwal volcano in the current Wadden Sea was active. In this time period, the area around the North Sea was seismically active because of the separation of the then-supercontinent Laurasia. When rifts occurred on other locations, in the Gulf of Biscay and the Atlantic Ocean, the area around the North Sea calmed down seismically. The volcano was covered by 3300 m of sediment layers, but due to halokinesis, ash and basalt remains have transferred upwards to layers at a depth of about 1660 m, which were shown by oil exploration drillings.

== Discovery ==
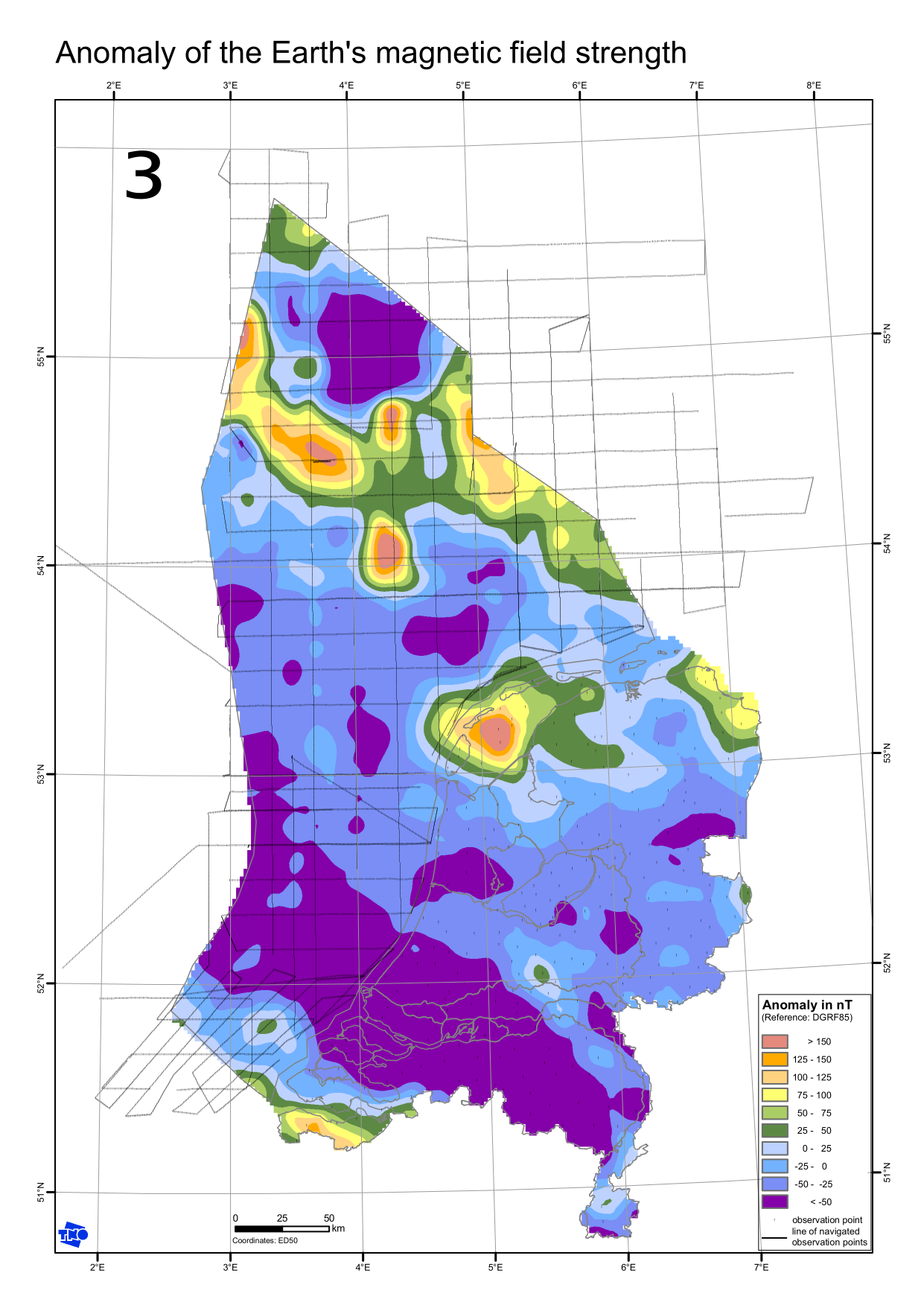
Deviation of the earth magnetic field on the North Sea. The Zuidwal volcano is the red blob in the Wadden Sea, Mulciber is the closest other blob to the northwest.

In the summer of 1985, oil exploration company Amoco performed a test drill and found several metres of volcanic ash and basalt. At the time, it was thought those were remains of the Zuidwal volcano, which is unlikely due to that volcano being 100 km to the south east. The Geologische Dienst Nederland, part of TNO, has reinterpreted existing data, among which seismic data of oil and gas exploration, Earth's magnetic field data and core samples, to perform a general geological study of the North Sea. In this study, geologists concluded that they found an extinct volcano. This was published in the news on 9 May 2020.

=== Name ===
The geologists of the Geologische Dienst Nederland named the volcano after Mulciber, the god of fire and volcanos in Roman mythology, also called Vulcan.

== Location ==
The core samples are from a location about 100 km north west of Terschelling, 20 km north of the Frisian Front, 60 km east of the Cleaver Bank and 100 km south west of the Dogger Bank. A few km south is the Off Friesland North-shipping lane. The closest point of orientation is the FR-A buoy, about 6.3 km south.

The volcano is about 3300 m below the sea floor. of the North Sea, which at that location is about 40 m deep.

In magmatic rock, minerals like magnetite and ferrous oxide occur frequently. This causes a deviation of the Earth's magnetic field at the location of Mulciber, comparable with that of the Zuidwal Volcano.

== See also ==
- Geology of the North Sea
