= Forties =

Forties may refer to:

- 40s, the years 40–49 AD
- 1940s, the years 1940–1949
- Long Forties, area in the North Sea
- The Forties shipping forecast area (roughly corresponding to the Long Forties)
- Forties oilfield in the North Sea
  - Forties pipeline system
- Roaring Forties, strong westerly winds found in the Southern Hemisphere
- Forty-ounce or forty, a glass bottle that holds 40 fluid ounces of malt liquor or beer
