= German submarine Hai =

Submarine of the Kriegsmarine

- Postwar photo of Hecht (S-171), (former Type XXIII submarine U-2367). An identical sister ship of U-2365

History

Nazi Germany
- Name: U-2365
- Ordered: 20 September 1944
- Builder: Deutsche Werft AG, Hamburg
- Yard number: 519
- Laid down: 6 December 1944
- Launched: 26 January 1945
- Commissioned: 2 March 1945
- Fate: Scuttled on 8 May 1945, raised in June 1956

West Germany
- Name: Hai
- Namesake: Shark
- Commissioned: 15 August 1957
- Identification: Pennant number:S 170
- Fate: Sunk on 14 September 1966, raised on 19 September 1966 and broken up

General characteristics
- Class & type: Type XXIII submarine
- Displacement: 234 t (230 long tons) (surfaced); 258 t (254 long tons) (submerged)
- Length: 34.68 m (113 ft 9 in) (o/a); 26.00 m (85 ft 4 in) (p/h)
- Beam: 3.02 m (9 ft 11 in) (o/a); 3.00 m (9 ft 10 in) (p/h)
- Draught: 3.66 m (12 ft)
- Installed power: 575–630 PS (423–463 kW; 567–621 shp) (diesel drive); 580 PS (430 kW; 570 shp) (standard electric drive); 35 PS (26 kW; 35 shp) (silent electric drive)
- Propulsion: 1 × MWM RS134S 6-cylinder diesel engine; 1 × AEG GU4463-8 double-acting electric motor; 1 × BBC CCR188 electric creeping motor
- Speed: 9.7 knots (18 km/h; 11 mph) (surfaced); 12.5 knots (23 km/h; 14 mph) (submerged)
- Range: 2,600 nautical miles (4,800 km; 3,000 mi) at 8 knots (15 km/h; 9.2 mph) surfaced; 194 nmi (359 km; 223 mi) at 4 knots (7.4 km/h; 4.6 mph) submerged
- Test depth: 180 m (590 ft)
- Complement: 14–18
- Armament: 2 × 53.3 cm (21 in) bow torpedo tubes; 2 × torpedoes

Service record (Kriegsmarine)
- Part of: 4th U-boat Flotilla; 2 March – 8 May 1945
- Identification codes: M 51 377
- Commanders: Oblt.z.S. Fritz-Otto Korfmann; 2 March – 2 May 1945; Oblt.z.S. Uwe Christiansen; 3 – 8 May 1945
- Operations: None
- Victories: None

German submarine Hai, the former U-2365 Type XXIII U-boat of Nazi Germany's Kriegsmarine during World War II, was one of the first submarines of the Bundesmarine. She was ordered on 20 September 1944, and was laid down on 6 December 1944 at Deutsche Werft AG, Hamburg, as yard number 519. She was launched on 26 January 1945 and commissioned under the command of Oberleutnant zur See Fritz-Otto Korfmann on 2 March 1945. Scuttled on 8 May 1945, the boat was raised in June 1956 and commissioned into the newly founded Bundesmarine as Hai, where she served until she sank by accident on 14 September 1966.

== Design ==
Like all Type XXIII U-boats, U-2365 had a displacement of 234 tonnes (230 long tons) when at the surface and 258 tonnes (254 long tons) while submerged. She had a total length of 34.68 m (113 ft 9 in) (o/a), a beam width of 3.02 m (9 ft 11 in) (o/a), and a draught depth of 3.66 m (12 ft). The submarine was powered by one MWM six-cylinder RS134S diesel engine providing 575–630 metric horsepower (423–463 kilowatts; 567–621 shaft horsepower), one AEG GU4463-8 double-acting electric motor electric motor providing 580 PS (430 kW; 570 shp), and one BBC silent running CCR188 electric motor providing 35 PS (26 kW; 35 shp).

The submarine had a maximum surface speed of 9.7 knots (18.0 km/h; 11.2 mph) and a submerged speed of 12.5 knots (23.2 km/h; 14.4 mph). When submerged, the boat could operate at 4 knots (7.4 km/h; 4.6 mph) for 194 nautical miles (359 km; 223 mi); when surfaced, she could travel 2,600 nautical miles (4,800 km; 3,000 mi) at 8 knots (15 km/h; 9.2 mph). U-2365 was fitted with two 53.3 cm (21 in) torpedo tubes in the bow. She could carry two preloaded torpedoes. The complement was 14 – 18 men. This class of U-boat did not carry a deck gun.

=== Modifications ===
In 1963 Hai was fitted at the shipyard of Blohm & Voss with a new diesel engine and at the same time lengthened by 1.2 meters.

== Service history ==
On 8 May 1945, U-2365 was scuttled northwest of Anholt in the Kattegat as part of Operation Regenbogen. The wreck was originally located at 56°51′N 11°49′E.

== Post war service ==
In June 1956, U-2365 was raised by the German Federal Navy and commissioned Hai on 15 August 1957. On 14 September 1966, she foundered on Dogger Bank in the North Sea during a gale. Nineteen of the twenty crewmen were lost, making this one of the worst peacetime naval disasters in German history. She was raised on 19 September 1966 from 47 m (154 ft) of water and broken up.

The wreck was located at 55°15′N 04°22′E.

== See also ==
- Battle of the Atlantic

== Bibliography ==
- Busch, Rainer; Röll, Hans-Joachim (1999). German U-boat commanders of World War II : a biographical dictionary. Translated by Brooks, Geoffrey. London, Annapolis, Md: Greenhill Books, Naval Institute Press. ISBN 1-55750-186-6.
- Gröner, Erich; Jung, Dieter; Maass, Martin (1991). German Warships 1815–1945, U-boats and Mine Warfare Vessels. Vol. 2. Translated by Thomas, Keith; Magowan, Rachel. London: Conway Maritime Press. ISBN 0-85177-593-4.
- Williamson, Gordon (2005). Wolf Pack: The Story of the U-boat in World War II. Osprey. ISBN 1841768723.
