= BP Impact Structure =

Exposed impact crater in Libya

Coordinates: 25°19′10″N 24°18′34″E

- Gebel Dalma
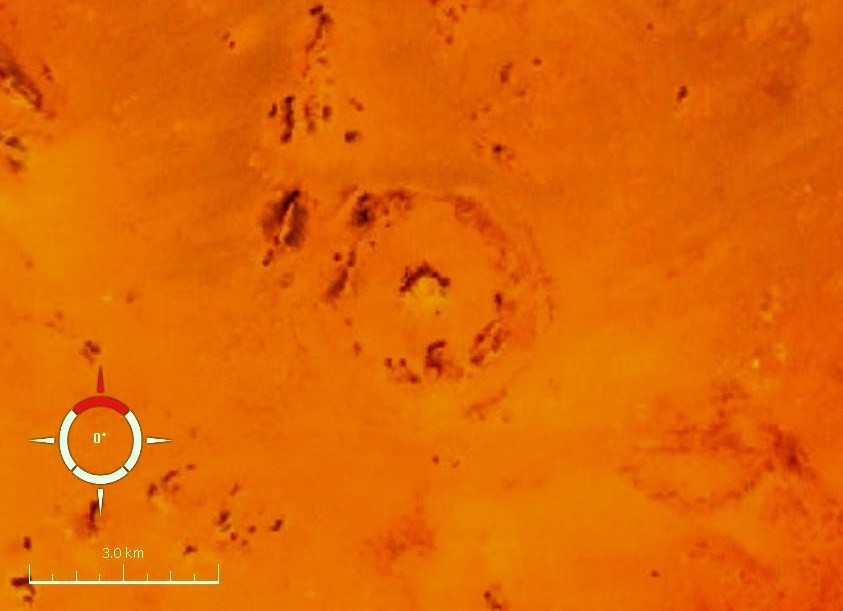
- Landsat image of the BP Impact Structure; screen capture from NASA World Wind
- Location: Libya

Impact crater structure
- Confidence: Confirmed
- Diameter: 3.2–3.4 kilometres (2.0–2.1 mi)
- Age: <120 Ma
- Exposed: Yes
- Drilled: No

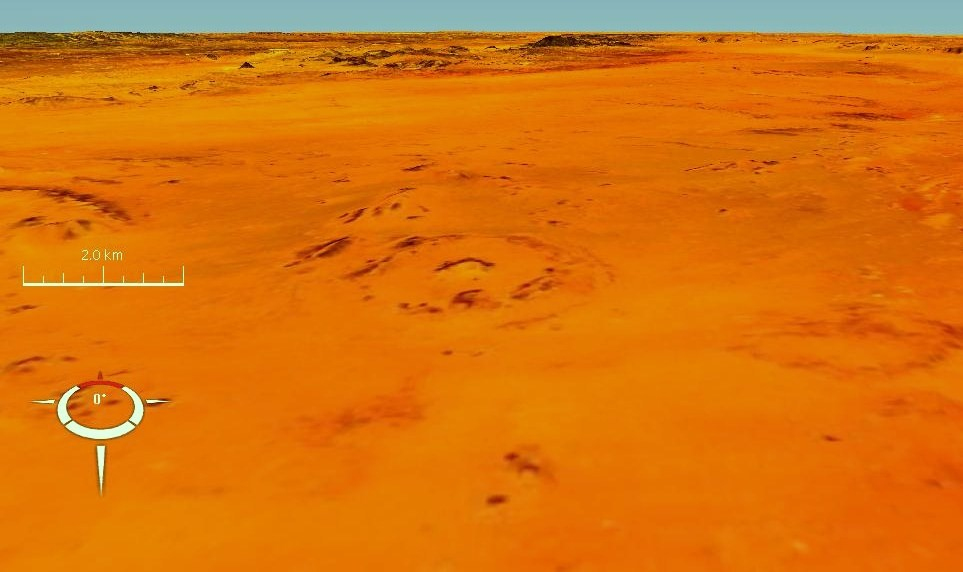
Oblique Landsat image of BP crater draped over digital elevation model (x5 vertical exaggeration); screen capture from NASA World Wind

The BP Impact Structure, also known as Gebel Dalma, is a deeply eroded impact structure that is located 165 km (103 mi) northeast of the Kufra Oasis in southwest Libya. The BP Impact Structure consists of three, discontinuous, concentric ridges that rise above the surrounding desert plain. These prominent, ridges consist mainly of deformed sedimentary rocks, e.g. mainly sandstone, siltstone, and minor conglomerate, of the early Cretaceous Nubian Sandstone. Its outermost discontinuous, concentric ridge is poorly preserved and, thus, its diameter is poorly constrained. Based on present-day morphology and radar data, its diameter is estimated to be around 3.2–3.4 km (2.0–2.1 mi).

== History ==
Kohman and others first recognized the BP Impact Structure, along with the Oasis Impact Structure, in 1967 using space and aerial photography. W. M. Johnson also identified both landforms as potential impact structures while using aerial photography to prepare geological maps of the Gebel Dalma area of Southern Cyrenaica in Libya. Later, A. J. Martin was the first geologist to visit this impact structure in 1968 as an employee of British Petroleum and named it after the company. In the early 1970s, B. M. French, J. R. Underwood, Jr, and others confirmed the impact origin of the BP Impact Structure as the result of more detailed, field studies.

== Description ==
The consists of highly eroded and discontinuous hills forming three rings. These hills rise as much as 20–30 m (66–98 ft)above the floors of the intervening valleys. The inner ring of hills is about 400–600 m (1,300–2,000 ft) in diameter and rise about 15 m (49 ft) above the adjacent valley floors. This ring is regarded to be the deeply eroded central uplift of a small, but complex, impact structure. The southern part of the inner ring of hills contains outcrops of chaotically deformed, light-colored sandstones. These sandstones are the oldest rocks exposed in the area. The second, middle ring of hills has a diameter of 2 km (1.2 mi) and a variable relief up to 30 m (98 ft)above the floors of the adjacent concentric valleys. The middle ring of hills consists of uniformly outward dipping strata that forms a prominent inward-dipping scarp. The strata dips between 30° and 50° and occasionally up to 70°. Plunging folds with axes tangent to the structure also have been mapped. The outer ring of hills is a semicircle with a diameter of 2.8 km (1.7 mi). Its southern half is its completely eroded and is difficult to identify in the field. These hills rise about a maximum of 20 m (66 ft) above the adjacent valley floors. The layers of sedimentary rocks that comprise the outer ring of hills dips inwards between 5° and 15°. They form a low scarp that barely protruded above the sand mantle in places. The sedimentary strata surrounding the BP Impact Structure is more or less flat lying.

Penetrating the shallow mantle of sand, radar imagery reveals a nearly complete bulls-eye pattern that is typical of a small, but complex, impact structure. The interpretation of this radar imagery indicates a diameter 3.2–3.4 km (2.0–2.1 mi) for the BP Impact Structure. This diameter is larger than the diameters inferred from either satellite or aerial imagery. The radar imagery also exhibits a circular drainage pattern resulting the interaction between fluvial activity and the geologic structure of the BP Impact Structure.

== Shock metamorphism ==
In 1974, French and others conclude that both the BP and Oasis structures are impact structures. This conclusion is based on their: (1) geometry, (2) style of deformation, and (3) indications of the high-pressure shock metamorphism of quartz grains. At both structures, they found a lack of meteorite fragments, shatter cones, megascopic breccia, Ne-Fe spherules, or impact glass. The lack of these features can be explained by the depth of erosion of both structures.

French and others reported finding multiple sets of planar elements in samples of medium-to coarse sandstone from the BP Impact Structure. These planar elements include abundant cleavage and shock lamellae with well-defined orientations in the {0001}, {1122}, and {1011} planes. These planar elements found in the medium-to coarse sand also include well defined cleavage and shock lamellae with orientations in the {1013} and {1012} planes. Typically, the quartz grains are shattered and fractured and surrounded by a matrix of small, angular shattered quartz. Many grains exhibit irregular and mosaic-like extinction. Some samples contained interstitial brown glass. They interpreted the presence of these planar elements as definite evidence for shock metamorphism and, thus, confirming the impact origin of the BP Impact Structure.

In 2001, W. U. Reimold and C. Koeberl visited the BP Impact Structure for 5-days of mapping and sample collection. None of the samples that they collected contained grains that displayed diagnostic planar deformation features. They found only planar fractures and other, non-diagnostic deformation bands in their samples. However, on a later visit in 2010, W. U. Reimold conducted a comprehensive re-sampling of the inner ring of hills, the central uplift area, of the BP Impact Structure. Later petrographic analysis of these samples revealed shock metamorphosed quartz diagnostic of extraterrestrial impact in the form of planar deformation features, planar fractures, and feather features. These features are associated with severe reduction of porosity and radial or conchoidal concussion fractures.

== Age ==
Rocks and minerals appropriate for the use of radiometric dating are absent from the BP and Oasis impact structures. As a result, the absolute age of both impact structures is unknown. In the absence of datable rocks and minerals, the maximum age of both structures is estimated on the assumed age of the Nubian sandstone being about 90–120 million years old. Based on the similar degree of erosion, it has been speculated that the BP and Oasis impact structures are of similar age and possibly the result of a double impact.

== Libyan desert glass ==
Beginning with their discovery, the B.P. and Oasis structures have been considered possible candidates for being the source of the Libyan desert glass. Chemical analyses of rock samples from the B.P. and Oasis structures show that they are similar enough to the composition of the Libyan desert glass to be the source of it. However, more recent trace element studies do not support the hypothesis that the Nubian sedimentary rocks associated with either the BP or Oasis structures are the source of the Libyan desert glass.

== See also ==
- Silverpit crater
