= Devil's Cave =

Devil's Cave may refer to:

Geography

- Caverna da Tapagem, Jacupiranga State Park near São Paulo, Brazil
- Devil's Cave, North Aurora, Illinois, United States
- Devil's Cave (near Pottenstein), Pottenstein, Bavaria, Germany
- Devil's Den (cave), Williston, Florida, United States
- Devil's Kitchen (cave), Mackinac Island, Michigan, United States
- Devil's Lair, Western Australia
- Devil's Throat Cave, Bulgaria
- Devil’s Gate Cave, eastern Siberia, Russia

Other

- Spice and the Devil's Cave, a book by Agnes Hewes

== See also ==
- Devils Hole (disambiguation)
