= Geology of the southern North Sea =

Largest gas producing basin

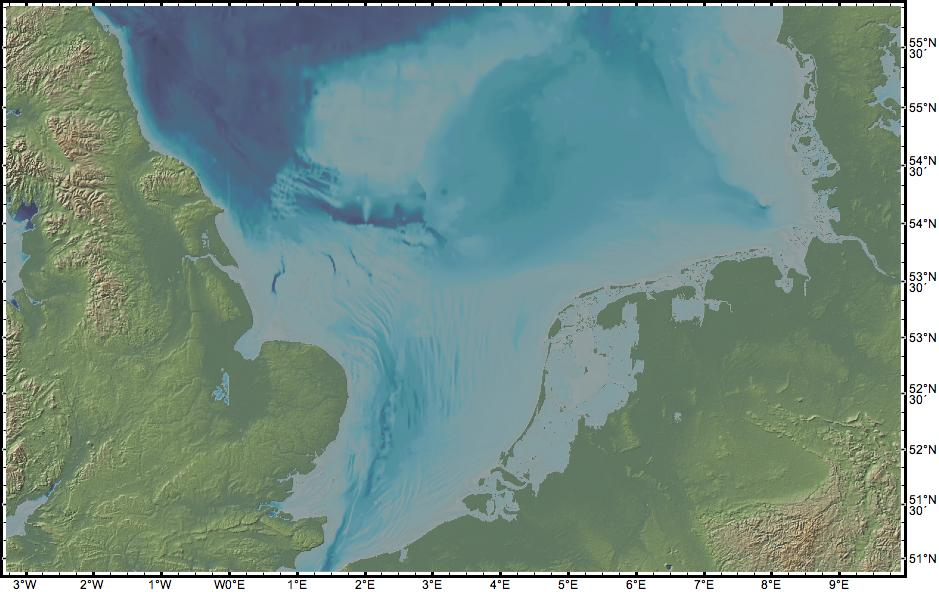
Location of the Southern North Sea provided by GeoMapApp

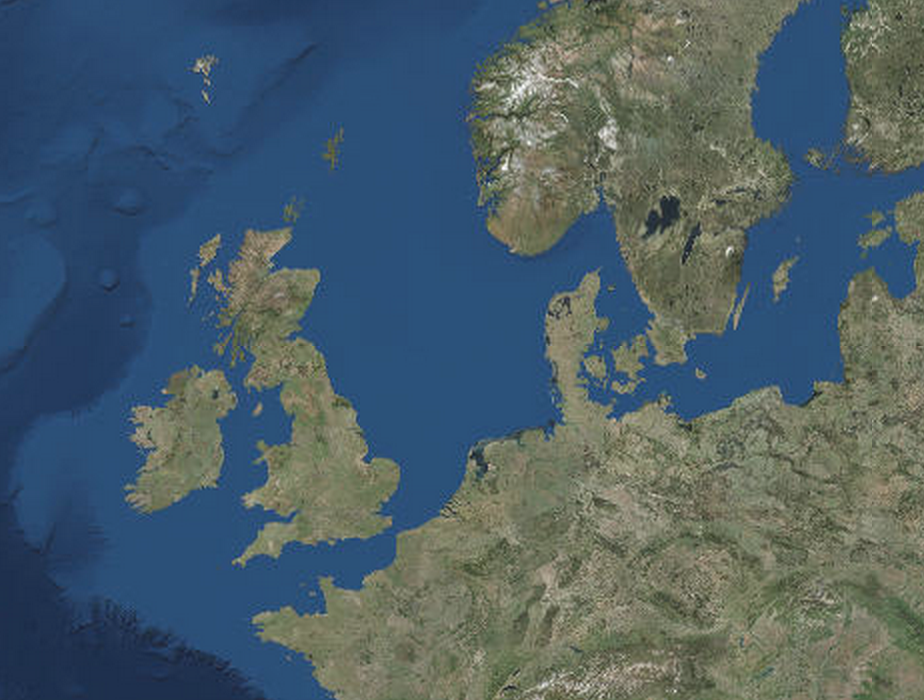
Aerial image of the North Sea provided by the United States Geological Survey

The North Sea basin is located in northern Europe and lies between the United Kingdom, and Norway just north of The Netherlands and can be divided into many sub-basins. The Southern North Sea basin is the largest gas producing basin in the UK continental shelf, with production coming from the lower Permian sandstones which are sealed by the upper Zechstein salt. The evolution of the North Sea basin occurred through multiple stages throughout the geologic timeline. First the creation of the Sub-Cambrian peneplain, followed by the Caledonian Orogeny in the late Silurian and early Devonian. Rift phases occurred in the late Paleozoic and early Mesozoic which allowed the opening of the northeastern Atlantic. Differential uplift occurred in the late Paleogene and Neogene. The geology of the Southern North Sea basin has a complex history of basinal subsidence that had occurred in the Paleozoic, Mesozoic, and Cenozoic. Uplift events occurred which were then followed by crustal extension which allowed rocks to become folded and faulted late in the Paleozoic. Tectonic movements allowed for halokinesis to occur with more uplift in the Mesozoic followed by a major phase of inversion occurred in the Cenozoic affecting many basins in northwestern Europe. The overall saucer-shaped geometry of the southern North Sea Basin indicates that the major faults have not been actively controlling sediment distribution.

== Geological history ==
=== Paleozoic era ===
Two major orogenic events occurred in this era, the Caledonian Orogeny and the Variscan Orogeny, allowing a complex geologic history to begin. During the late Silurian and early Devonian the Caledonian Orogeny occurred with episodes of uplift and erosion leaving unconformities. The Caledonian event occurred due to the collision of three land masses – Laurentia, Baltica, and Avalonia – which would eventually lead to the creation of Pangea. This collision allowed for a mountain belt to form NW–SE in the northern portion of the current basin, and in the south extending SW–NE. Following the Caledonian Orogeny approximately 380 Ma the Variscan Orogeny started and ended near the Permian. During this time period the orogeny caused Carboniferous rocks to become folded and faulted. The last collision occurred in the late Carboniferous where two supercontinents collided leading to the Varsican mountain range, Laurasia and Gondwanaland. Late Permian deposition of evaporites created the Zechstein supergroup which act as a salt cap for the fine grained sediment.

=== Mesozoic era ===
During this era the end of extensional tectonics had been well constrained in the southern North Sea basin; the extension occurred from the late Carboniferous to the Triassic. There had been some reactivation of Varsican basement faults due to the subsidence of the Sole Pit Basin and allowing basin tilts creating a peripheral graben system around the basin. Due to the reactivation of the basement faults it led to the beginning of halokinesis in the basin. The halokinesis allowed major uplift during the Mesozoic because of the presence of salt and the reactivation of basement faults; the thrusting permitted the sediment to thrust over the diapirs and float on top of the Zechstein salt. Due to the Kimmerian phase uplift in the northern portion of the North Sea, it allowed subsidence and deposition to fill the basin, creating sandstone. Due to differential loading along the faults, salt diapirs developed and played a huge role in the southern North Sea basin and all salt tectonic structures. Reverse faulting associated with late Carboniferous basin inversion is recorded by a wide range of Carboniferous stratigraphy subcropping the Permian sediments. The subcrop pattern indicates a strong influence of NW–SE tectonic trends during this inversion. This inversion event was followed by deposition of upper Carboniferous red beds, which pass up into sands of the Permian Rotliegend Group; these are overlain by evaporites of the Zechstein Supergroup. A major phase of basin inversion during or at the end of the Late Cretaceous affected many basins in northwestern Europe, including the Sole Pit Basin and the Cleveland Basin, and has been attributed to strike-slip reactivation of basement faults.

=== Cenozoic era ===
During the end of the Mesozoic and into the Cenozoic era the Alpine orogeny occurred which led to reactivation of faults and structures. In the beginning of the Tertiary, inversion involving basin tilt and reactivation of basement faults transpired. The center part of the southern North Sea basin comprises the Silver Pit and Sole Pit trough and the Cleaver Bank High, which are all distinguished by a series of salt swells and walls which occurred in the Tertiary. A reversal of basin tilt during the Tertiary uplifted the thick sedimentary wedge in the Sole Pit Trough to form the Sole Pit High. Since the orogeny reactivated the Mesozoic rifts it permitted the Zechstein salts to act as a buffer or detachment layer separating two structural regimes, which can lead to traps for natural resources.

== Tectonic phases ==
=== Caledonian phase ===
During the Paleozoic there were three major landmasses that collided, Laurentia, Baltica, and Avalonia closing the Iapetus ocean. The event created a mountain chain trending North to South in the northern portion and an East to West trend in the South. The reason being that there is a North to South trend in the North is because Laurentia coming from the West and Baltica coming from the east meeting at the center to create a compressional regime. Through time eventually Avalonia coming from the south closing the Iapetus ocean, collided with the two landmasses to create a T-junction giving an East to West trend in the southern portion. This event is the first major event that would lead to the creation of Pangea. The tectonic event comprised the entire Ordovician and into the early Devonian, the Caledonian rocks are the basement of the current North Sea.

=== Variscan phase ===
From the late Devonian to the end of the Permian ending in the Paleozoic era the Variscan Orogeny occurred. The super continents of Gondwanaland and Laurussia collided creating an extensive mountain range just east of the pre-existing Caledonian mountains and creating Pangea the super continent at the end of the Variscan phase. The collision of these plates plays an important role in the potential of hydrocarbons in the Southern North Sea basin. The start of this phase is the collapsing of the Caledonian orogeny and a general extensional regime which would cause a depression to fill with sediment. There are four major phases in this orogenic event. First phase known as the Bretonian reflected in changes in the sediment input and the reactivation of a south plunging subduction zone. The second phase, the Sudetian, was of volcanic event and extrusive metamorphic and igneous rocks with uplift and mild folding of grabens in the vicinity which lead to inversion. The Asturian tectonic phase created fragmentation of the Variscans and its foreland due to the complex fault system of conjugate shear faults and secondary extensional faults. The last major phase, the Staphanian, caused the majority of faulting and deformation expressed in wrench faults. The accumulation of hydrocarbons in the south was permitted due to the basin that was formed, the foreland basin was barely disturbed by tectonic events in the northern region and eventually sealed up by the salt caps of the Zechstein formation. Since the Caledonian and Variscan orogeny are closely related in time both events helped create Pangea and the Caledonians slowly phase into the Variscan orogeny.

=== Kimmerian phase ===
Pangea animation 03

The break up of Pangea occurs during the Kimmerian tectonic phase for most of the Mesozoic, until the early-mid Cretaceous, this marks the start of creating the present position of our continents today. During the Jurassic, rifting activity reaches its maximum and North America starts to move apart from Eurasia following that event in the Cretaceous the southern part of North America starts to open up the Atlantic Ocean with the separation of South America and Africa. At the end of the Mesozoic the North Sea reached its final position where it lies in present day. Throughout the Cretaceous rifting eventually slowed down and came to a halt which later created the North Sea failed rift system because the regional stresses had shifted on to North America. The Jurassic is probably the most important geological time for hydrocarbon exploration in the North Sea. Many accumulations are in Jurassic reservoir, the Kimmeridge clay is considered the most important source rock and structures formed during rifting form excellent traps. In the first place rifting was responsible for the deposition of organic rich source rock due to anoxic conditions in the deep isolated rift basins. Possibly the most important phase to create structures and traps for the natural resources we try to collect today.

=== Alpine phase ===
This phase is currently active and started in the Cretaceous.In the late Cretaceous and in the Tertiary inversion phases in the Southern North Sea region occurred due to the Alpine orogeny and its compressional stresses. Since there had been inversion the Zechstein salt played a huge role by acting as a buffer between two structural regimes. Although the phase reactivated pre-existing faults it allowed the salt tectonics to remain active during the Tertiary as the sediments were deposited, and later became penetrated by the salt diapirs. The Alpine phase did add more structural confusion to the geologic history, but it also help create more traps with the Zechstein salt.

== Sedimentary formations ==
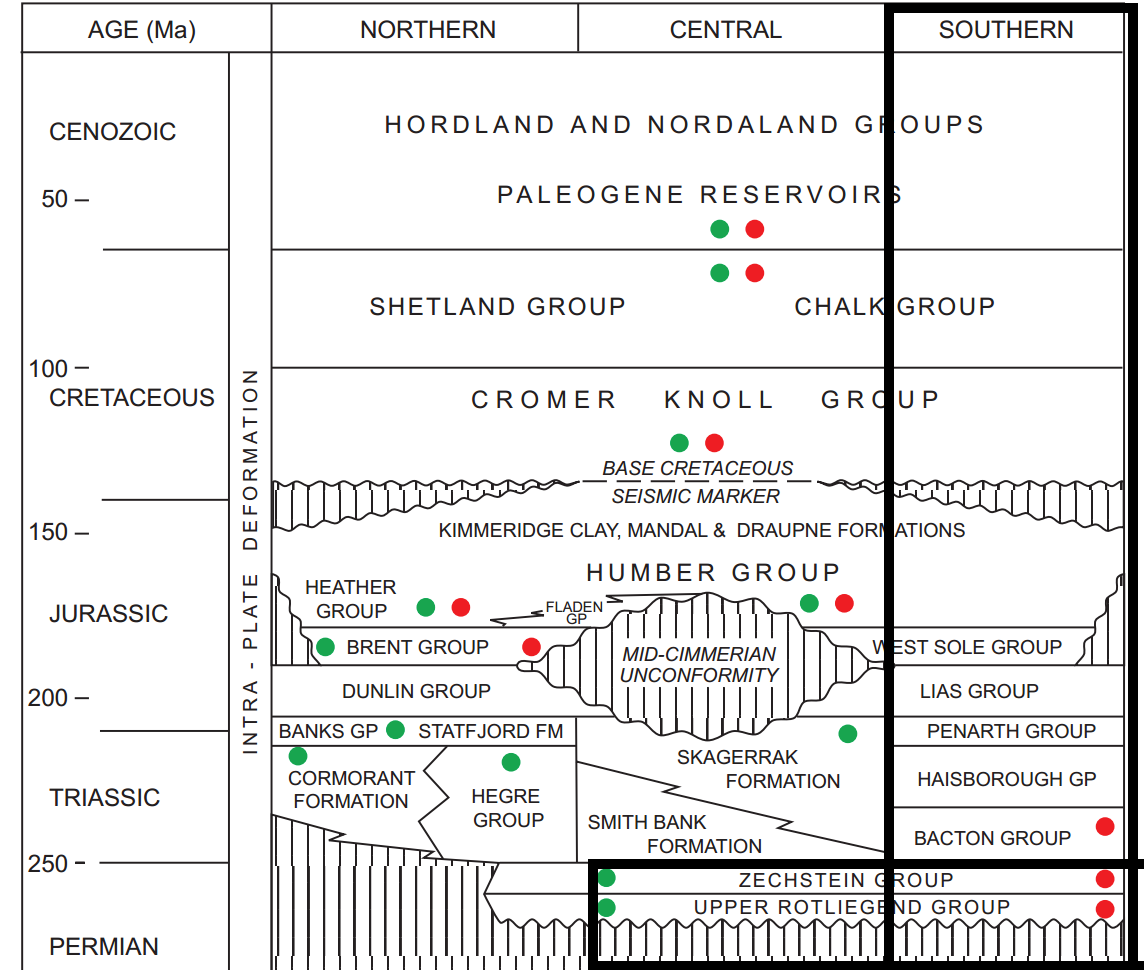
Main Formations

=== Rotliegend group ===
The sandstones of the Southern North Sea region form gas reservoirs. Deposition started in the early Permian, and near the end of the early Permian finer sediment was deposited in an environment of lacustrine and saline/sabkha.

=== Zechstein group ===
The Zechstein group consists of evaporites which sealed the Rotliegend group for reservoir formation. Sedimentation was dominated by the development of mixed carbonate-evaporite depositional system throughout the southern Permian basin. Climatic conditions allowed the deposition of five major sedimentary cycles of progressive progradation and desiccation of the basin after an initial recharge through basin flooding.

=== Cromer Knoll group ===
The Cromer Knoll is deposited on top of an unconformity at the base of the Cretaceous period. Regional uplift and erosion allowed the unconformity to appear in the late Triassic and depositing the Cromer Knoll and chalk groups.

== Salt tectonics ==
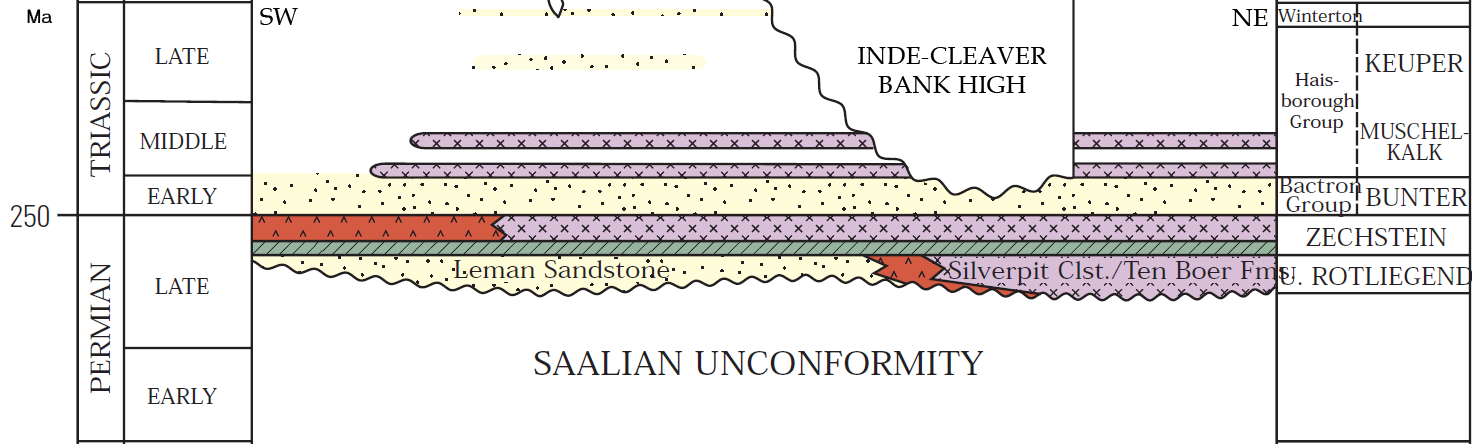
Zechstein salt cap

Salt tectonics is the movement of a significant amount of evaporites encompassing salt rock within a stratigraphic sequence of rocks. Within the southern North Sea basin this plays a huge role in the oil and gas industry because the tectonic events throughout the geologic timescale allowed these halokinesis structures to trap areas of natural resources. The major salt basins were clearly deposited by gravity driven measurements with three basinal areas: the German, English and Norwegian basins. The southern North Sea basin concerns the English and German Zechstein salt basins. The German basin can be categorized as a salt wall which is a linear diapiric structure possibly related either to basement faulting or to the controlling effect of regional dip, and the English basin is categorized as a salt pillow type of structure, developed in association with thinning of overlying beds but without diapiric effects. The major types of salt structures in this basin are salt pillows or swells which lie in the cores of buckle fold structures.

== Petroleum geology ==
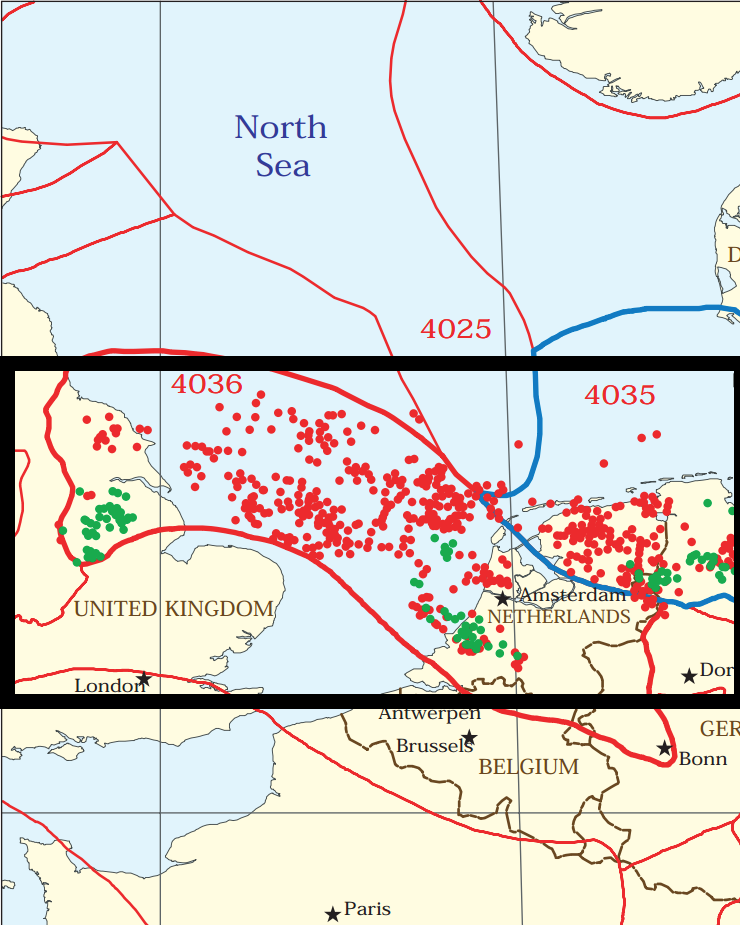
Location of oilfields (green dots) and gasfields (red dots) in the Southern North Sea

In general the reservoir potential is restricted to aeolian sandstone, although poorer quality potential reservoirs are found in fluvial sediment. About 85% of the gas production in the southern North Sea basin comes from the pre-Zechstein Permian sandstones and 13% from the Triassic fluvial sandstones. The sandstone deposited prior to the Zechstein evaporites are essentially the area in which the oil industry is pulling the natural resources from due to high quality seal from the salt diapirs and pillows which acted as a buffer between structural segments. Triassic sequence fluvial sandstones are of lesser quality of a reservoir because it was not sealed in a trap such as the Rotliegend.

== See also ==
- North German basin
- List of shoals and sandbanks in the southern North Sea
