= Silverpit crater =

Seabed feature of the North Sea

Silverpit Crater

Silverpit crater is a buried sub-sea structure under the North Sea off the coast of the island of Great Britain. The 20 km (12 mi) crater-like form, named after the Silver Pit—a nearby sea-floor valley recognized by generations of fishermen—was discovered during the routine analysis of seismic data collected during exploration for gas in the Southern North Sea Sedimentary Basin.

Its origin as a meteor impact structure was first proposed and widely reported in 2002. It would be the first impact crater identified in or near Great Britain. Its age was proposed to lie somewhere in a 29-million-year interval between 74 and 45 million years (Late Cretaceous–Eocene).

Other authors have disputed its extraterrestrial origin. An alternative origin was proposed in which the feature was created by withdrawal of rock support by salt mobility, which was overwhelmingly judged to be more plausible in a 2009 debate held by the Geological Society of London. A 2025 paper presented new evidence in favour of an impact origin, suggesting that it was created during the Eocene 46–43 million years ago, with a diameter of approximately 3.2 kilometres (2.0 mi), surrounded by a disturbed zone 18 kilometres (11 mi) in diameter.

== Discovery ==
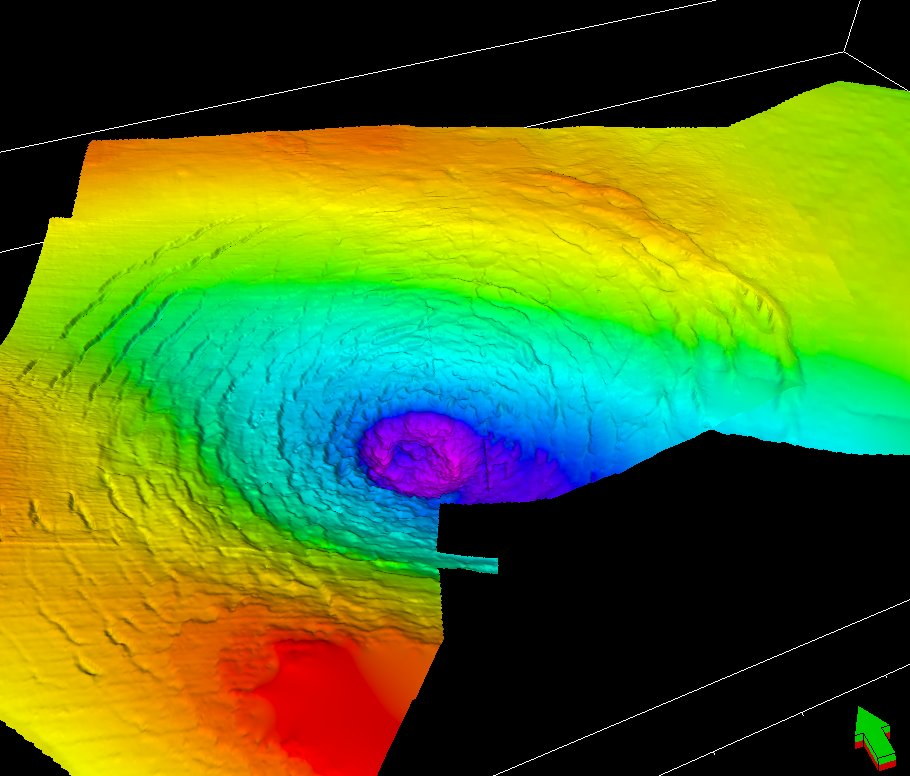
A perspective view of the top chalk surface, looking north-east, showing the central crater and its surrounding rings. False colours indicate depth (red/yellow=shallow; blue/purple=deep).

The crater-like structure was discovered by petroleum geoscientists Simon Stewart and Philip Allen. Analyzing seismic data for a region 130 km (81 mi) off the Humber estuary, Allen noticed an unusual set of concentric rings. Thinking they resembled a meteor-strike but lacking experience in impact structures, he hung an image of them on the wall of his office, hoping someone else might be able to shed light on the mystery. Stewart, who had long predicted that a crater would be found on 3D seismic data, saw the image and suggested it might be an impact feature. The discovery of the crater and the impact hypothesis were reported in the journal Nature in 2002.

The structure currently lies below a layer of sediment up to 1,500 m (4,900 ft) thick, which forms the bed of the North Sea at a depth of about 40 m (130 ft). Stewart and Allen's studies suggest that at the time of its formation, the area was under 50 to 300 m (160 to 980 ft) of water.

The Silverpit crater lies near the south of the Dogger Bank in the central North Sea, and it is understood to be named after the Outer Silver Pit and Silver Pit seabed features and fishing grounds to the south and south west of its location.

Only three years before the announcement of the discovery of the Silverpit crater, it had been suggested that seismic data from the North Sea would have a good chance of containing evidence of an impact crater: given the rate of crater formation on the Earth and the size of the North Sea, the expected number of impact craters would be one.

== Origin ==
The origin of the crater is debated by the geoscience community with alternate theories of salt withdrawal and pull-apart basin proposed, raising doubts as to Silverpit's categorization as an impact structure.

=== Evidence in favour of impact origin ===
Other mechanisms for producing a crater were considered and rejected by Allen and Stewart when they discovered the crater. Volcanism was excluded because there were no magnetic anomalies in the crater, which would be expected if eruptions had occurred there. Withdrawal of salt deposits below the crater, known to be a mechanism for the formation of some craters, was ruled out because the Triassic and Permian layers of rock beneath the crater appeared to be undisturbed. Another strong indication that an impact had created the crater was the presence of a central peak – something that Stewart & Allen contend is difficult to form except through a meteorite impact. In 2025, shocked mineral grains were reported from drill cores suggested to represent ejecta from the impact, indicating pressures of 10–13 gigapascals, consistent with an impact origin.

=== Evidence for alternative interpretations ===
Analysis of regional 2D seismic lines and 3D seismic volumes by John Underhill, a geologist at the University of Edinburgh, led to the counterproposal that withdrawal of Upper Permian (Zechstein Supergroup) salt at depth was in fact a better explanation. Underhill found that all layers of rock down to the Permian (with an age of about 250 million years) are synclinically folded, and that sediments of Tertiary age at the crater onlap its sides and thicken into its axis, suggesting that the salt was moving (a process called halokinesis) while Tertiary sediments were being laid down.

In 2007, Underhill continued to present evidence that he argues does not support the impact hypothesis. After analyzing seismic data over a wide region, he proposed that Silverpit was just one of many similar features related to the withdrawal of the Permian-age Zechstein salt. This result was presented at the April 2007 annual meeting of the American Association of Petroleum Geologists

Underhill then focused his research attention upon understanding why the salt moves where it does when it does and why the so-called crater took the form that it did. This led him to publish a peer-review article in the journal, Petroleum Geoscience in August 2009 in which he outlined the evidence for an intrusion-related salt withdrawal cause for the feature's formation.

In October 2009, an open debate of the notion that "the Silverpit Crater was formed by meteor impact" was held at the Geological Society of London. Simon Stewart gave the case for the motion and John Underhill presented the case against. The outcome was overwhelming support for Underhill's alternative genesis through melt-induced salt withdrawal.

== Structure ==
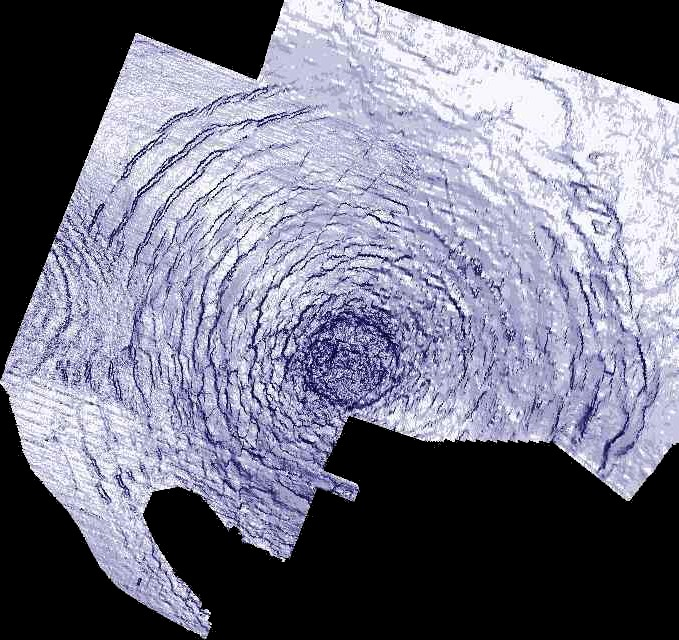
Seismic data showing the crater and its concentric ring structure

Silverpit crater is about 3 km (1.9 mi) wide at the top Cretaceous level. Unusually for a terrestrial crater, it is surrounded by a set of concentric rings, which extend to about 10 km (6.2 mi) radius from the centre. These rings give the crater a somewhat similar appearance to Valhalla crater on Jupiter's moon Callisto, and other craters on Europa. Normally, multi-ringed craters tend to be much larger than Silverpit, and so, if the impact hypothesis is correct, the origin of Silverpit's rings is subject to debate. A complicating factor is that almost all known impact craters are on land, despite the fact that two-thirds of impacting objects will land in oceans and seas, so the results of impacts on water are much less well established than those of impacts on land. Compare the Chesapeake Bay impact crater, probably the most thoroughly studied marine impact zone.

One possibility is that after the impact excavated a bowl-shaped depression, soft material surrounding it slumped towards the centre, leaving the concentric rings. It is thought that for this to happen, the soft material would have to be quite a thin layer, with more brittle material on top. A thin layer of mobile material beneath a solid crust is easy to understand in the context of icy moons, but is not a common occurrence on the rocky bodies of the Solar System. One suggestion is that overpressured chalk below the surface may have acted as the soft mobile layer.

== Impact ==
If one assumes the meteor impact theory is right, the size of the crater can be combined with assumptions about the speed of an impacting object to estimate the size of the impactor itself. Impacting objects are generally moving at speeds of the order of 20–50 km/s (12–31 mi/s), and at these speeds an object about 120 m (390 ft) across and with a mass of 2.0×10^{9} kg (4.4×10^{9} lb) would be required to form a Silverpit-sized crater, if the object was rocky. If it had been a comet, the crater would have been larger.

For comparison, the object which struck the Earth at Chicxulub is estimated to have measured approximately 10 kilometres (6 mi) across, while the object responsible for the Tunguska event in 1908 is thought to have been a comet or asteroid about 60 m (200 ft) across, with a mass of about 4×10^{8} kg (8.8×10^{8} lb).

An object 120 m (390 ft) across smashing into the sea at many kilometers per second would generate enormous tsunamis. Scientists are currently searching for any evidence of large tsunamis in the surrounding areas dating from around that time, but no such evidence has been uncovered yet.

== Age ==
The position of the crater within the layers of rock and sediment on the sea floor could in theory be used to constrain its age: sediments laid down before the crater's formation might conceivably be disturbed by the impact, while those laid down afterwards will not. In their discovery paper, Allen and Stewart stated that Silverpit was formed in Cretaceous chalk and Jurassic shale, but is covered by an undisturbed layer of Paleogene sediment. The Cretaceous Period ended about 66 million years ago, but, on the evidence of nearby boreholes, the lowermost Paleogene sediments appear to be absent. Thus the age of the Silverpit event was initially stated to lie somewhere between 66 and 60 million years before present. However, after a more detailed appraisal of the seismic data, Allen and Stewart gave a more cautious estimate of the age as between 74 and 45 million years (Late Cretaceous – Eocene).

The stratigraphic method of estimating the age of a crater is somewhat crude and imprecise, and the result is questioned by Underhill's non-impact hypothesis. Assuming an impact origin, other possible ways of dating the event include looking for evidence of ejecta material such as tektites, and deposits from the hypothesised tsunami, which might be found anywhere around the North Sea basin. As well as allowing a more accurate age determination, finding such evidence would also strengthen the impact hypothesis. Two nearby oil exploration wells penetrate the ring system, yet cutting samples from these fail to provide any independent support for the meteor theory, thus weakening the case for it being due to an extraterrestrial body.

Analysis of samples taken directly from the central crater would also assist age determination as well as confirm one or other of the proposed theories; until this has occurred Silverpit cannot be confirmed as an impact structure.

== Multiple impact hypothesis ==
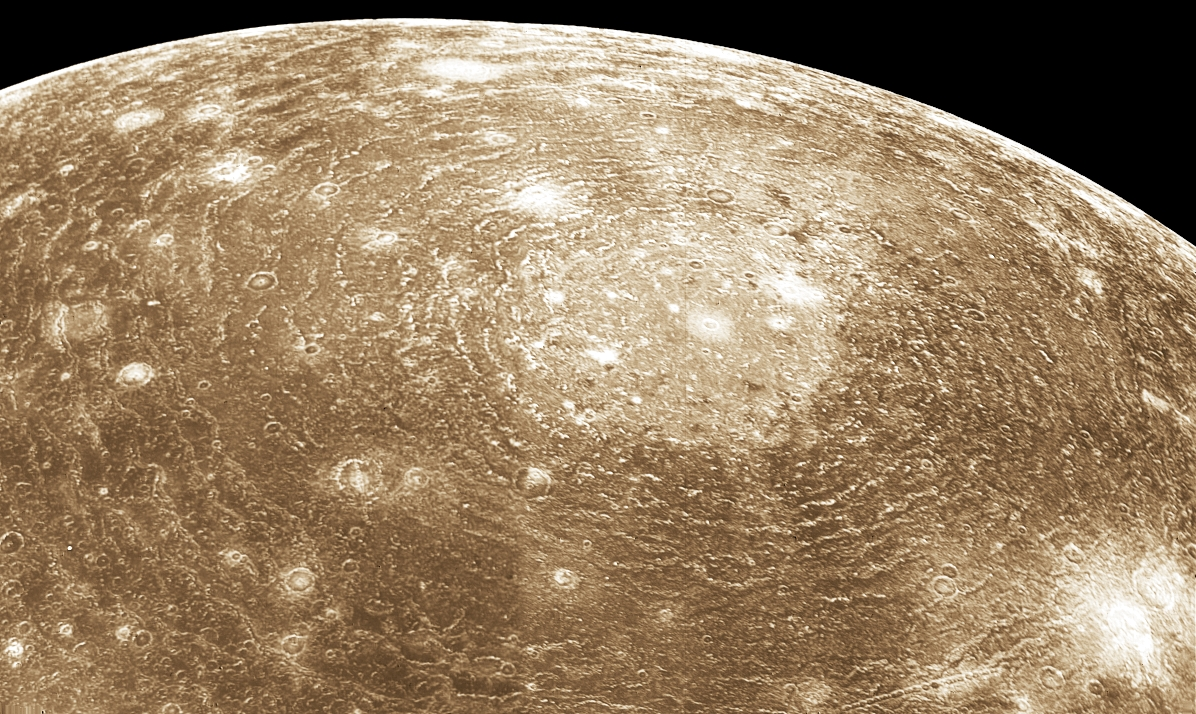
Silverpit bears a stronger resemblance to Valhalla crater on Jupiter's moon Callisto than it does to other terrestrial craters.

The early estimate of the age of the Silverpit event, stated as 66–60 million years before present, overlaps with the age of the Chicxulub impact near the northwest corner of the Yucatan Peninsula, which occurred 66 million years ago and probably played a major role in the extinction of the non-avian dinosaurs. Several other large impact craters of around the same age have been discovered, all between latitudes 20°N and 70°N, leading to the speculative hypothesis that the Chicxulub impact may have been only one of several impacts that happened all at the same time.

The collision of Comet Shoemaker-Levy 9 with Jupiter in 1994 proved that gravitational interactions can fragment a comet, giving rise to many impacts over a period of a few days if the comet fragments should collide with a planet. Comets frequently undergo gravitational interactions with the gas giants, and similar disruptions and collisions are very likely to have occurred in the past.

While this scenario may have occurred on Earth 66 million years ago, evidence for this hypothesis is not strong. In particular, the ages of some of the possibly related craters are only known to an accuracy of a few million years. Even if it were formed by bolide impact, the increased uncertainty in the age estimate for Silverpit to 74–45 million years further weakens the hypothesis.

== See also ==
- BP Impact Structure, an impact structure also discovered by BP.
- Doggerland, the Silverpit's area which was above sea level in human prehistory.
- Silver Pit and Outer Silver Pit, seabed features in the southern north sea.
- Impact event
- List of possible impact structures on Earth
- Mjølnir crater, a 145-million-years-old impact crater in the Barents sea.
- Stac Fada Member (Ullapool bolide), ejecta from another impact crater in the British Isles.
