= Zuidwal volcano =

Extinct undersea volcano in the Netherlands

- Location within Netherlands

Highest point
- Coordinates: 53.2126°N 5.1777°E

Naming
- Native name: Zuidwalvulkaan (Dutch)

Geology
- Mountain type: Extinct stratovolcano
- Last eruption: Late Jurassic

The Zuidwal volcano is an extinct volcano in the Netherlands at more than 2 km (6,600 ft) below ground under the Wadden Sea, between Harlingen and Vlieland, just south west of the island Griend. The volcano was last active during the late Jurassic, (about 160 - 148 Ma ago) and has since been covered by about 2,000 metres (6,600 ft) of sedimentary rock, most of it shale and sandstone from the Cretaceous.

== Discovery ==
The volcano was discovered in 1970 when the French oil company Elf Aquitaine was doing test drills in the Wadden Sea, hoping to find a gas field that a seismic survey had indicated. To their surprise they hit volcanic rock beneath the reservoir rock, which turned out to be an extinct volcano. The gas field went in production in 1988 and continued producing gas until 2021. Another clue indicating the presence of the volcano was the temperature. While the usual temperature at that depth is about 100 °C (212 °F), they found 130 °C (266 °F).

== Volcano ==
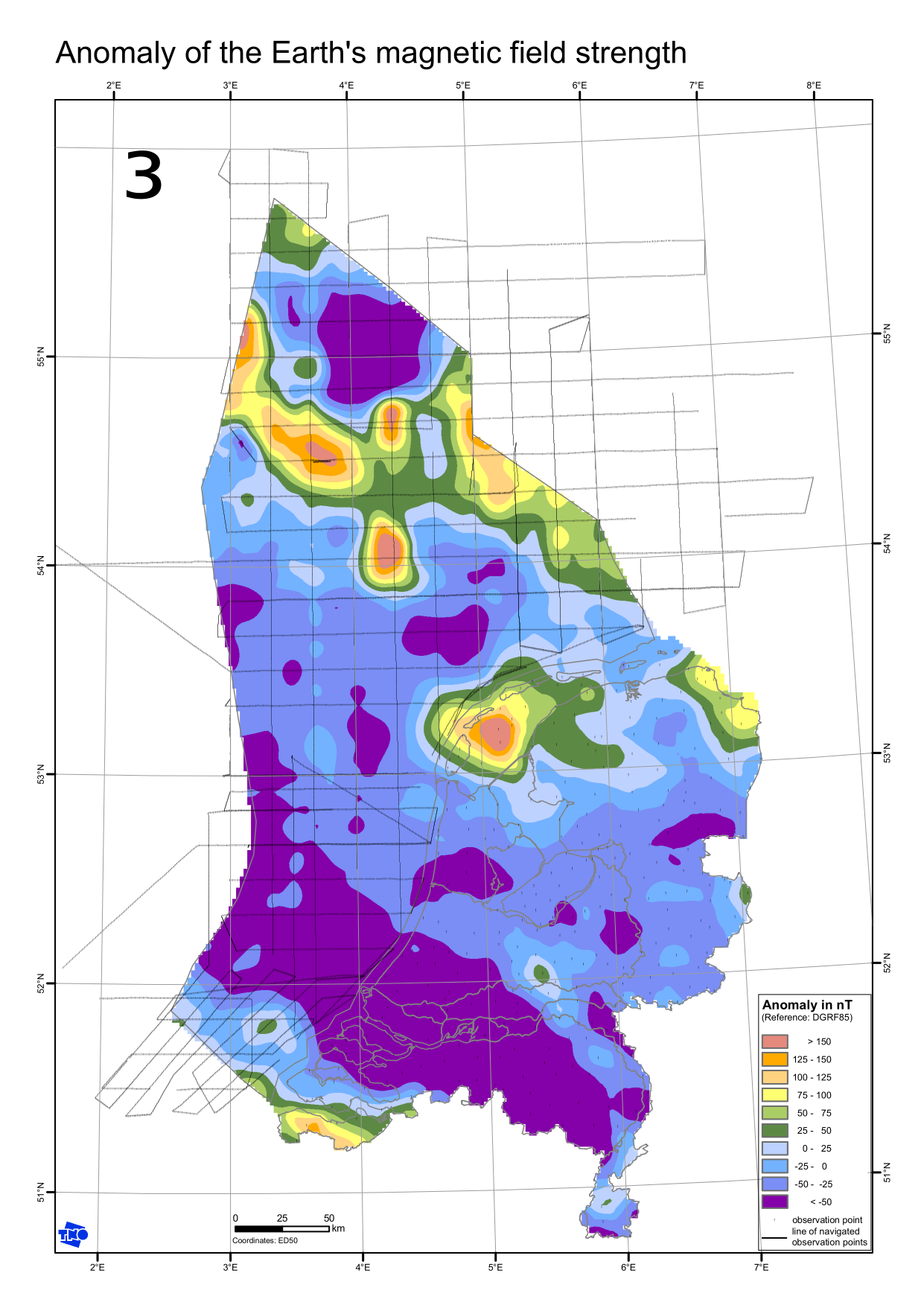
Deviation of the earth magnetic field on the North Sea. The Zuidwal volcano is the red blob in the Wadden Sea, Mulciber is the closest other blob to the northwest.

The volcano has a height of approximately 1 km (3,300 ft) and a circumference of several kilometers. The volcano was formed about 160 million years ago, during a time of orogenesis on the European continent. The eruptions were short and severe with heavy explosions. This, along with the mineral composition, points to volcanic activity as a result of subduction far away from the volcano. During the Cimmerian Orogeny, the Cimmerian Plate collided with Kazakhstania, sending shock waves through the Eurasian Plate, resulting in volcanism.

The volcano is covered by layers of sandstone from the early Cretaceous that act as reservoir rock for the gas. The seal rock consists of shale.

The volcanic rock is magnetic, creating a magnetic anomaly.

== See also ==
- Mulciber (volcano)
