= Broad Fourteens =

Area of the southern North Sea

Coordinates: 53°0′0″N 3°45′0″E

Broad Fourteens

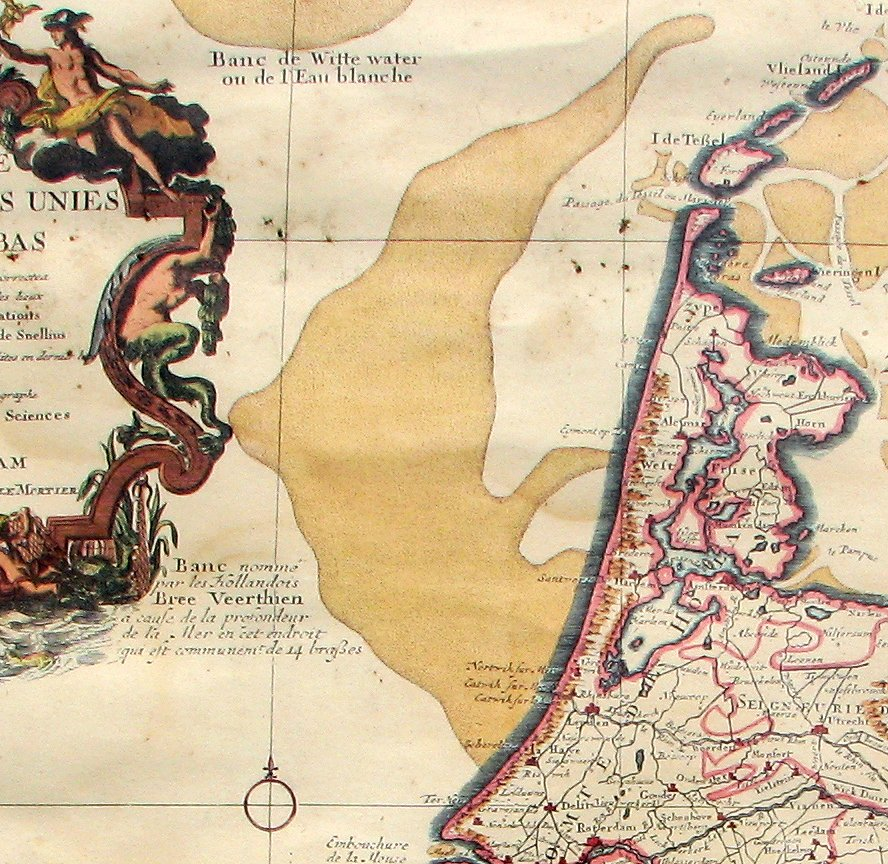
The Broad Fourteens on a map by Delisle (1743)

The Broad Fourteens is an area of the southern North Sea that is fairly consistently 14 fathoms (84 ft; 26 m) deep. Thus, on a nautical chart with depths given in fathoms, a broad area with many "14" notations can be seen.

== Extent ==
The Broad Fourteens region is located off the coast of the Netherlands and south of the Dogger Bank, roughly between longitude 3°E and 4°30'E and latitude 52°30'N and 53°30'N. The area is known to the Dutch and German navies as the Breeveertien ("Fourteen"). Geologically it is comparable to the Long Forties, another submerged plateau that has related origins.

== Naval battles ==
Naval engagements in the region have included the torpedoing of three British armoured cruisers in the action of 22 September 1914 during World War I.

== Navigation ==
The shallowness of the area means that the largest oil tankers when fully loaded cannot traverse the Broad Fourteens to reach the English Channel from the North Sea because their draft is too deep.

== In media ==
The area features as a major setting in the WWII film The Broad Fourteens, which is a dramatization of Royal Navy motor torpedo boat operations in the English Channel and surrounding areas.

== See also ==
- Dogger Bank for map and links to similar places
