= Dogger Bank =

Large sandbank in the North Sea

Coordinates: 54°43′N 2°46′E

Dogger Bank

Dogger Bank (Dutch: Doggersbank, German: Doggerbank, Danish: Doggerbanke) is a large sandbank in a shallow area of the North Sea about 100 kilometres (55 nautical miles) off the east coast of England.

During the ice age, the bank was part of a large landmass connecting mainland Europe and the British Isles, now known as Doggerland. It has long been known by fishermen to be a productive fishing bank; it was named after the doggers, medieval Dutch fishing boats especially used for catching cod.

At the beginning of the 21st century, the area was identified as a potential site for major British offshore wind farm developments.

== Name ==
The name Dogger Bank was first recorded in the mid-17th century. It is probably derived from the word "dogger" used for a two-masted boat of the type that trawled for fish in the area in medieval times. The area has similar names in Dutch, German, Swedish, and Danish.

== Geography ==
The bank extends over about 17,600 square kilometres (6,800 sq mi), and is about 260 by 100 kilometres (160 by 60 mi) in extent. The water depth ranges from 15 to 36 metres (50 to 120 ft), about 20 metres (65 ft) shallower than the surrounding sea.

=== Geology ===
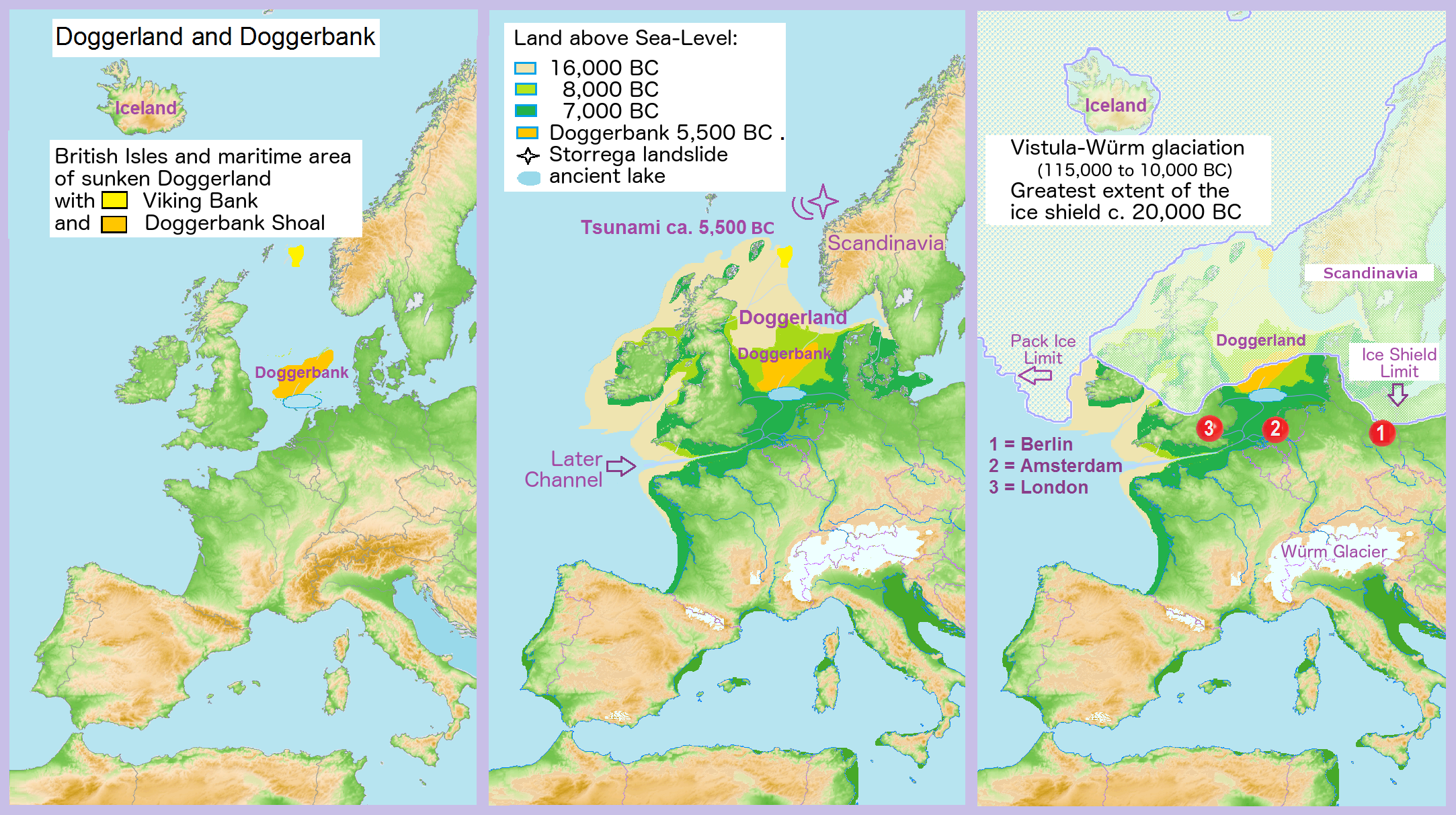
A map showing the Last Glacial context of Dogger Bank

Dogger Bank was formed during the Last Glacial Maximum as a result of glaciolacustrine deposition, spanning from around 31,600 to 23,100 years ago, with the bank in its current form being a thrust moraine, formed as a result of glaciotectonism in the adjacent Dogger proglacial lake.

Fishing trawlers working the area have dredged up large amounts of moor peat, remains of mammoth and rhinoceros, and occasionally Palaeolithic hunting artefacts.

The 1931 Dogger Bank earthquake took place below the bank, measuring 6.1 on the Richter scale and was the largest earthquake ever recorded in the United Kingdom. Its hypocentre was 23 kilometres (14 mi) beneath the bank, and the quake was felt in countries all around the North Sea, causing damage across eastern England.

The Silverpit crater, discovered in 2002, is a suspected impact crater located on the southern edge of the Dogger Bank.

South of Dogger Bank is the Cleaver Bank.

== Naval battles and incidents ==
- Battle of Dogger Bank (1696), during the Nine Years' War a French fleet under the command of Jean Bart was victorious over the ships of a Dutch force of five ships and the convoy it was escorting.
- Battle of Dogger Bank (1781), during the Fourth Anglo-Dutch War, a Royal Navy squadron fought a Dutch squadron on 5 August 1781.
- Dogger Bank incident, during the Russo-Japanese War, Russian naval ships opened fire on British fishing boats in the area of Dogger Bank on 21 October 1904, mistaking them for Japanese torpedo boats.
- Battle of Dogger Bank (1915) and Battle of Dogger Bank (1916), during the First World War, saw battles between the Royal Navy and the German High Seas Fleet.

Several shipwrecks lie on the bank. In 1966, the German submarine U-Hai, a German Type XXIII submarine, sank during a gale. 19 of 20 men died, one of the worst peacetime naval disasters in German history.

== Ecology ==
The bank is an important fishing area, with cod and herring being caught in large numbers. Dogger Bank has been identified as an oceanic environment that exhibits high primary productivity throughout the year in the form of phytoplankton. As such, it was proposed to designate the area a Marine Nature Reserve. Under European Union legislation, the protected area has been divided between several countries, including the United Kingdom.

In 2025, an international coalition of six organizations, the Irish Atlantic Technological University, the British Blue Marine Foundation, the German Bund für Umwelt und Naturschutz, the Danish chapter of the WWF, the Dutch ARK Rewilding Netherlands, and the Embassy of the North Sea, led by the Doggerland Foundation in the Netherlands, launched the Rewilding Dogger Bank program, in an effort to restore and protect the area. The three-year initiative is set to act on several fronts, from legal actions aimed at protecting the areas from harmful activities, to the restoration of northern horsemussel reefs, and a greater representation of the area's marine life in key decisions.

=== Trawling and protected areas ===
In September 2020, Greenpeace dropped several granite boulders from their ship Esperanza on the Dogger Bank area. Concerns had been raised when a supertrawler had been seen off the Yorkshire coast. The action undertaken by Greenpeace had support from some of those in the fishing trade. The large granite rocks are harmless to marine life and surface fishing, but they get entangled in the weighted nets of bottom trawlers, obstructing the practice. A Greenpeace spokesperson said "how can you continue to allow bottom trawlers to plough the seabed in a protected area? .... [it] is the equivalent to allowing bulldozers to plough through a protected forest."

== Wind farms and wind power hub ==
=== Offshore wind farms ===
The Dogger Bank was selected for offshore wind farm development because it is far away from shore - ensuring high winds and avoiding complaints about the visual impact of wind turbines – yet the water is shallow enough to be ideal for traditional fixed-foundation wind turbine designs. The scale of the Dogger Bank also gives the potential for large quantities of generating capacity and the associated economies of scale.

Between 2010 and 2024, the United Kingdom's Crown Estate granted leases for seven offshore wind farms to be developed on the Dogger Bank, in a series of licensing rounds. By 2021 the first four of these projects had begun construction, with the first three expected to be fully operational by 2026. In 2026, two of the remaining projects were awarded subsidy contracts by the British government and are expected to begin operating in the early 2030s.

Between these seven projects, the Dogger Bank will be one of the largest offshore wind developments in the world. With a potential installed capacity of over nine gigawatts, it could represent around 8% of Britain's total electricity generating capacity at the time of construction.

=== Wind power hub ===
Dutch, German, and Danish electrical grid operators are cooperating in a project to build a North Sea Wind Power Hub complex on one or more artificial islands to be constructed on Dogger Bank as part of a European system for sustainable electricity. At the North Seas Energy Forum in Brussels on 23 March 2017, Energinet.dk will sign a contract to work with the German and Dutch branches of TenneT; after that, a feasibility study will be produced.

== In popular culture ==
- The sea shanty "Sailing Over The Dogger Bank" is themed around the sandbank. It is also known for being heard in the SpongeBob SquarePants episode "Sailor Mouth".
- In the sitcom The Fall And Rise of Reginald Perrin, Series 2, one of the useless items sold by Reggie's chain of "Grot" shops was cheque books issued by the Dogger Bank.
- In the 1994 song “This is a Low” by British group Blur, the second verse reads “Hit traffic on the Dogger Bank,” one of a number of nautical references in the track.

== See also ==
- Doggerland – Former landmass in Northern Europe
- Dogger Bank Wind Farm – Wind farm cluster off the coast of England
- North Sea Wind Power Hub – Proposed artificial island near England
- Fishing in the North Sea
- Dogger Bank itch – a dermatological condition common in North Sea fishermen
- Other places in the North Sea:
  - Broad Fourteens – Area of the southern North Sea
  - Devil's Hole (North Sea) – Group of deep trenches in the North Sea east of Dundee, Scotland
  - Fisher Bank – Bank in the North Sea
  - Fladen Ground – Area in the North Sea
  - Long Forties – Zone of North Sea
  - Silver Pit – Fishing ground and submerged valley in the North Sea
  - Outer Silver Pit – seabed feature in the southern North Sea
  - Inner and Outer Dowsing sand banks – bank in the North Sea
