= Devil's Hole (North Sea) =

Group of deep trenches in the North Sea east of Dundee, Scotland

Coordinates: 56°38′N 0°40′E

Devil's Hole

The Devil's Hole is a group of deep trenches in the North Sea about 200 km (120 mi) east of Dundee, Scotland.

The features, which were first charted by HMS Fitzroy, were officially recorded in the Royal Geographical Society's Geographical Journal in 1931. Soundings showed that the surrounding seabed is between 80 and 90 metres (260 and 300 ft) but the trenches are as deep as 230 metres (750 feet). They run in a north–south direction and are on average between 1 and 2 km (0.62 and 1.24 mi) in width and 20 to 30 km (12 to 19 mi) long.

Historically, fishermen have known about the Devil's Hole for generations due, having lost trawl nets on the trenches' steep sides. It is for this reason that the area took its name.

The gradient of the trench sides in the Devil's Hole is up to 10° in places. In a comparison, the continental shelf north west of Great Britain has an average gradient of 1°.

== See also ==
- Dogger Bank for map and links to similar places
