= Outer Silver Pit =

Outer Silver Pit

The Outer Silver Pit is a west-to-east valley in the bed of the North Sea. Its widest part is 125 to 175 km (78 to 109 mi) east of Flamborough Head in England. It is between the Dogger Bank and the ridge dividing the northern from the southern North Sea basins, which runs between Norfolk and Friesland. The Silver Pit seabed depression lies to the south west.

When the sea level was lower (such as in the Ice Age) it was a lake in Doggerland, and sea-bed-penetrating sonar bathymetry has found its shorelines and courses and estuaries of rivers that ran into it from the high land of the Dogger Bank; it overflowed into a river at its west end.

== Bed of the Rhine? ==
In the Cromerian Stage, before more recent glaciation had influenced the area, a ridge of high ground, the Weald-Artois Anticline, joined the Upper Cretaceous chalk in Kent, England to that of the Boulonnais at Cap Blanc-Nez in the Pas de Calais, France. It is possible that in the Cromerian Stage, the Outer Silver Pit was the bed of the combined Maas, Rhine, Scheldt and Thames. Since at that stage, the Weald-Artois Anticline had probably not been breached by the glacial lake outburst floods that scoured the Strait of Dover, the southern North Sea basin held a freshwater lake impounded by the ridge of the Weald-Artois Anticline and by the Norfolk-Friesland ridge. Whether the lake spilled north through the Outer Silver Pit would depend on how much the modern sea bed to the north has been raised by later marine and glacial sediment, and how much the various parts of the area were raised by forebulge effect caused by the weight of the Scandinavian ice cap. The east end of the Outer Silver Pit is in line with the lowest part of the Norfolk-Friesland ridge. The outlet at the western end of the pit appears to be blocked by somewhat higher ground.

== Bed of the Urstrom? ==
There is an older theory that the Outer Silver Pit was part of the valley of the great ice-age river Urstrom, during some of the Ice Ages when the Scandinavian ice did not meet the British ice, leaving the North Sea bed with open drainage northwards. Maps by some geologists show rivers from the German part of the Urstrom's catchment area flowing northwards east of the Dogger Bank highland area; but Scandinavian ice reaching the Dogger Bank would have forced the Urstrom into another route.

When the Scandinavian and Scottish ice caps first met, the Urstrom (unless it found a way northwards under the ice) would have backed up into a huge lake in the southern North Sea, which finally found an outlet southwards over the Weald-Artois Anticline and helped to cut the valley of the Strait of Dover: see Strait of Dover#Geological formation.

== See also ==
- Dogger Bank for map and links to similar places
- Silver Pit
- Timeline of glaciation
