= Silver Pit =

Fishing ground and submerged valley in the North Sea

(Inner) Silver Pit

The Silver Pit is a long valley in the bed of the North Sea, 45 km (28 mi) east of Spurn Head in England. At some point in time the Silver Pit was part of the valley of the Wash River.

Also notable is the Silverpit crater, a suspected impact crater located north east of the Silver Pit and named after it, discovered in 2002. The Outer Silver Pit also lies to the north east.

== Origin of the Silver Pit ==
In origin, it is probably a tunnel valley (Benn & Evans fig.9.27) which was kept free of periglacial deposits by the Wash River when the sea level was lower, towards the end of the Devensian glaciation. However, the Silver Pit may date partially or largely from the Wolstonian Stage.

The Silver Pit (or Silver Pits) was discovered in the 19th century by trawler fishermen from the South Coast of England. They found the small valley to be rich in flatfish, especially soles in winter.

== See also ==
- Dogger Bank for map and links to similar places
- Doggerland
- Outer Silver Pit
- Inner and Outer Dowsing sand banks
- Timeline of glaciation
