= Long Forties =

Zone of North Sea

Long Forties

Long Forties is a zone of the northern North Sea that is fairly consistently forty fathoms (240 ft; 73 m) deep.

== Extent ==
Long Forties are between the northeast coasts of Scotland and the southwest coast of Norway, centred about 57°N 0°30′E; compare to the Broad Fourteens.

== Alternative terms ==
=== Forties ===
The Shipping Forecast area Forties approximates to Long Forties, though with neater boundaries. The north of the latter falls in Viking.

=== Fladen Grounds ===
Fladen Grounds is the next more northern, eastern and deeper part of the sea. The Dutch weather service KNMI, and Norwegian equivalent, use their tongues' similar names for and meaning Fladen Grounds instead of Forties and most of Viking. The Swedish weather institute, which reported for this zone until 2005 followed these leads.

== Etymology ==
When depth sounding (originally fathoming with rope and plumb weight), the recorded depth would for a long haul remain 40 fathoms. On a traditional imperial measurements nautical chart, a great zone with many "40"s appears.

== Geology ==
The Forties Oil Field is the largest oil field of the sea, 110 miles (180 km) east of Aberdeen. It was discovered in 1970 and first produced oil in 1975 under ownership of British Petroleum.

The Forties Formation consists of a lower Shale Member and an upper Sandstone Member, which were deposited in a "middle and lower submarine fan environment". The initial development plan included a "complete replacement seawater injection system" starting in 1975. When the field was sold in 2003, reservoir engineers estimated the STOIIP (original oil in place) was 4.2 billion barrels (0.67 cubic kilometres).

== See also ==
- North Sea
- Dogger Bank has map and related places
- Broad Fourteens
- Roaring Forties
- Forties Oil Field
