= List of World War I U-boat commanders =

This is a list of World War I U-boat commanders in the Imperial German and Austro-Hungarian Navies. Only sunk and captured merchant ships are counted in the totals; warships and damaged ships are not.

Commanders killed in action are indicated by a † after their name. Those awarded the Pour le Mérite, Imperial Germany's highest honour, are designated with a ^{PM}.

Photographs may not always have been taken during World War I.

Name	Patrols	Ships sunk	Tonnage sunk (tons)	Notes	Picture
Lothar von Arnauld de la Perière^{PM}	15	193	453,371	Arnauld de la Perière (1886–1941) is the most successful submarine commander in history in terms of both ships and total tonnage sunk. Between 1915 and 1918, he made 14 patrols in command of U-35, sinking 189 merchant vessels and two gunboats. He transferred to U-139 in May 1918 and sank a further five merchant ships. After serving as an instructor in the Turkish Navy between 1932 and 1938, he returned to the Kriegsmarine and during World War II served as naval commandant for western France with the rank of Vizeadmiral. He was killed in February 1941 when his aircraft crashed on takeoff at Le Bourget Airport, Paris.	
Wilhelm Canaris	N/A	4	23,592	Canaris (1887–1945) commanded various U-boats from 1917 on. However, he is much better known as the admiral in charge of the Abwehr, German military intelligence, in World War II.	
Karl Dönitz	3	5	16,598	Dönitz (1891–1980) commanded UC-25 and UB-68 in 1918. In World War II, he was a grand admiral in charge of all U-boats, later the commander-in-chief of the entire navy, and finally, after Hitler's suicide, the head of state and commander of all Germany's armed forces.	
Walther Forstmann^{PM}	47	148	390,797	Forstmann (1883–1973) commanded U-12 and U-39. In addition to merchant shipping, while skipper of U-12, he sank the gunboat HMS Niger. He served on the staff of the Kriegsmarine during World War II.	
Werner Fürbringer	N/A	101	97,881	Fürbringer (1888–1982) commanded a variety of small, coastal U-boats. UB-110, his last submarine, was rammed and sunk by HMS Garry on 19 July 1918. He accused the Garry's crew of firing on unarmed survivors. He also served in various posts in World War II, and was promoted to Konteradmiral in 1942, before leaving the military in 1943.	
Heino von Heimburg^{PM}	N/A	19	44,167	Heimburg (1889–1945) also sank several warships: the Italian submarine Medusa, the Italian cruiser Amalfi, the British submarine HMS E20 and the French submarine Ariane, as well as two troop transports, HMT Southland and RMS Royal Edward. When HMS E7 became entangled in torpedo nets nearby, he rowed out in a small skiff and lowered a small explosive charge, forcing the British submarine to surface; the crew had to scuttle her. In World War II, he served as a vice admiral.	
Otto Hersing^{PM}	N/A	36	79,005	Hersing (1885–1960), in command of U-21, was responsible for the first sinking of a modern warship by a submarine-launched torpedo in history, sending the light cruiser HMS Pathfinder to the bottom in September 1914. He also sank the battleships HMS Triumph and HMS Majestic—earning him the nickname "Zerstörer von Schlachtschiffen" (destroyer of battleships)—the French armoured cruiser Amiral Charner and the French auxiliary cruiser Carthage.	
Hans Howaldt^{PM}	11	63	95,518	Howaldt (1888–1970) commanded UC-4, UB-40 and UB-107.	
Waldemar Kophamel^{PM}	N/A	55	157,473	Kophamel (1880–1934) commanded U-35 and U-140.	
Carl Albrecht Kroll †	3	10	26,963	Korvettenkapitän Kroll (1882–1918) commanded U-110.	
Johannes Lohs^{PM} †	13	76	142,406	Lohs (1889–1918) commanded UC-75 and UB-57. While at the helm of UB-57, he sank the armed merchant cruiser HMS Moldavia. He died when UB-57 was lost in the North Sea in August 1918.	
Wilhelm Marschall	N/A	43	119,170	Marschall (1886–1976) commanded UC-74 (1916–17) and UB-105 (1918), and received the Pour le Mérite. After World War I, he continued his career in the German Navy, serving as an admiral during World War II.	
Martin Niemöller	N/A	3	9,903	After serving aboard other U-boats, Niemöller (1892–1984) was given command of UC-67 in June 1918.In 1924, he was ordained a Lutheran pastor. He opposed the Weimar Republic and was initially a supporter of Adolf Hitler, but later co-founded the Confessing Church, a movement resisting Nazi efforts to control German Protestant churches, and was imprisoned in concentration camps from 1938 to 1945. He wrote the 1946 poem "First they came ..." and became a vocal pacifist and anti-war activist in later life.	
Helmut Patzig	N/A	24	87,326	Patzig (1890–1984) commanded U-86 and U-90 during 1918. As commander of U-86, he sank the Canadian hospital ship HMHS Llandovery Castle, contrary to both international law and standing orders of the Imperial German Navy. Then he ordered the ramming of lifeboats and machinegunning of survivors in an attempt to cover up the war crime. Postwar, he fled German jurisdiction and was never tried. Under the name Helmut Brümmer-Patzig, he also served in World War II in various posts, including command of the 26th U-boat Flotilla.	
Hans Rose^{PM}	N/A	81	220,892	Rose (1885–1969) commanded U-53 between 1916 and 1918, sinking USS Jacob Jones, the first American destroyer to be lost during the war. He commanded a U-boat training unit in 1940.	
Hellmuth von Ruckteschell	N/A	20	25,985	Ruckteschell (1890−1948) commanded UB-34 and U-54. He was considered by the Allies to have breached the laws of war, but left Germany and was not tried at that time. In World War II, he was one of the most successful merchant raider captains, at the helm of the auxiliary cruisers Widder and Michel. After the war, he was convicted of war crimes, for allegedly continuing to fire after merchant ships had surrendered, and was sentenced to 10 years imprisonment. However, the Royal Navy acknowledged there may have been a miscarriage of justice due to the lack of naval experience in the court: only one junior naval officer had sat as a judge.	
Alfred Saalwächter	N/A	27	64,084	Saalwächter (1883–1945) commanded U-25, U-46 and U-94. He remained in the navy after the end of World War I. He was promoted to Generaladmiral in January 1940 and led surface operations in World War II, including tactical command of Operation Weserübung, the invasion of Norway.	
Reinhold Saltzwedel^{PM} †	N/A	111	172,824	Saltzwedel (1889–1917) commanded six U-boats during the war. He was killed in December 1917 when UB-81 was sunk by a mine off the Isle of Wight.	
Otto von Schrader	N/A	57	54,663	Schrader (1888–1945) commanded various U-boats. He was an admiral in World War II.	
Otto Schultze^{PM}	N/A	53	132,564	Schultze (1884–1966) commanded U-63. U-63 finished off the badly damaged light cruiser HMS Falmouth, which had been torpedoed twice by U-66. He held several staff posts in the interwar period and was recalled from retirement to active service in World War II, eventually rising to the rank of Generaladmiral (equivalent to four-star admiral), before retiring again in 1942.	
Walther Schwieger^{PM} †	34	49	185,212	Schwieger (1885–1917) commanded U-14, U-20 and U-88. While in command of U-20, he sank the passenger liner RMS Lusitania, an event which was a key factor in the United States' eventual entry into the war. Schwieger was killed when U-88 was sunk by a British mine off the Dutch coast in September 1917.	
Edgar von Spiegel von und zu Peckelsheim	N/A	14	36,925	Spiegel (1885–1965) commanded U-32 and U-93. Appointed German consul in New Orleans in 1937, he probably radioed information about merchant shipping departures for England to U-boats stationed in the Gulf of Mexico.	
Otto Steinbrinck^{PM}	N/A	204	233,072	Steinbrinck (1888–1949) commanded several submarines during World War I. After the war, he joined the Nazi Party in 1933 and became a member of the SS, rising to the rank of Brigadeführer. In 1945, he was arrested and faced charges at the Flick Trial. In December 1947, he was sentenced to six years imprisonment in Landsberg Prison, but died two years into his sentence.	
Georg von Trapp	19	11	47,653	Von Trapp (1880–1947) was the most successful Austro-Hungarian submarine commander of the war. In addition to 11 merchant ships, he also sank the French armored cruiser Léon Gambetta and the Italian submarine Nereide. After the war, he lost most of his money, which had been deposited in an Austrian bank that failed. He turned to music to earn money, along with his second wife, Maria, and their children, forming the Trapp Family Singers (as depicted in The Sound of Music, with artistic liberties). After Austria was annexed to Nazi Germany in 1938, he was offered a commission in the Kriegsmarine, but he and his family emigrated to the United States instead.	
Józef Unrug	N/A	0	0	Unrug (1884–1973) commanded UB-25, UC-11 and UC-28. After Poland became a nation again in 1919, he joined its navy and was quickly made a counter admiral (equivalent to rear admiral). He fiercely resisted the German invasion of Poland, which initiated World War II, and was made a prisoner of war.	
Max Valentiner^{PM}	N/A	143	298,803	Valentiner (1883–1949) commanded U-38 and U-157. Listed as a war criminal by the Allies for a series of incidents, including the sinking of the passenger liner SS Persia without warning, Valentiner went into hiding for a while at the end of the war. During World War II, Valentiner led a unit inspecting new U-boats before commissioning.	
Walter Warzecha	N/A	9	22,612	Warzecha (1891–1956) commanded UC-1, UC-71 and UB-148. He returned to naval service in 1920. In World War II, in 1944 he was Generaladmiral and was appointed Chef der Kriegsmarinewehr ("Chief of the Navy"). After Germany's surrender, he assumed the duties of commander-in-chief of the Kriegsmarine and presided over its dissolution.	
Otto Weddigen^{PM} †	N/A	4	12,934	Weddigen (1882–1915) sank three British armoured cruisers - HMS Aboukir, HMS Hogue and HMS Cressy - in less than an hour. This feat, along with the sinking of the protected cruiser HMS Hawke, resulted in the award of the Pour le Mérite. He was killed when U-29 surfaced in the path of the British battleship HMS Dreadnought after firing a torpedo at another ship. After a short chase, Dreadnought rammed U-29, splitting her in two.	
Raimund Weisbach	N/A	36	107,763	As the torpedo officer of U-20, Weisbach (1886–1970) fired the torpedo that sank the British ocean liner RMS Lusitania. He was later given command of U-19 and U-81. He survived the sinking of U-81 and was a prisoner for the rest of the war.	
Johannes Spieß	N/A	40	78,716	Spiess served as executive officer to Otto Weddigen on the U-9 and was present at the often recounted sinking of the British cruisers HMS Aboukir, HMS Hogue and HMS Cressy. He was later given command of U-9 where he remained a submarine commander until the end of the war. During this time, he also commanded the U-19, U-52, and U-135.	
