= HMS H1 =

Submarine of the Royal Navy

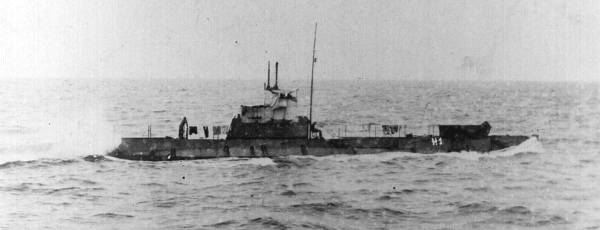

History

United Kingdom
- Name: H1
- Builder: Canadian Vickers, Montreal
- Laid down: 11 January 1915
- Launched: 1 April 1915
- Commissioned: 26 May 1915
- Fate: Sold, 7 March 1921

General characteristics
- Class & type: H-class submarine
- Displacement: 364 long tons (370 t) surfaced; 434 long tons (441 t) submerged
- Length: 150 ft 3 in (45.80 m)
- Beam: 15 ft 4 in (4.67 m)
- Installed power: 2 × 240 hp (179 kW) diesel engines; 2 × 310 hp (231 kW) electric motors
- Propulsion: 2 × propeller shafts
- Speed: 13 knots (24 km/h; 15 mph) surfaced; 10 knots (19 km/h; 12 mph) submerged
- Range: 1,600 nmi (3,000 km) at 10 kn (19 km/h; 12 mph) surfaced; 130 nmi (240 km) at 2 kn (3.7 km/h; 2.3 mph) submerged
- Complement: 22
- Armament: 4 × 18 in (457 mm) bow torpedo tubes; 6 × 18 inch torpedoes; 1 × QF 6 pounder gun

HMS H1 was a H-class submarine built by Canadian Vickers Co., Montreal for the British Royal Navy. She was laid down on 11 January 1915 and was commissioned on 26 May 1915. H1 crossed the Atlantic from St. John's, Newfoundland to Gibraltar escorted by the armed merchant cruiser HMS Calgarian. She was accompanied by H2, H3 and H4. H1 mistakenly sank the H5 off Cattaro on 15 April 1918. H1 was sold on 7 March 1921 in Malta.

== Design ==
She had a displacement of 364 long tons (370 t) at the surface and 434 long tons (441 t) while submerged. Her total length was 150 feet 3 inches (45.8 m), with a beam of 15 feet 4 inches (4.7 m) and a draught of 12 feet (3.7 m).

Her two diesel engines provided a total power of 480 horsepower (360 kW) and her two electric motors provided 320 horsepower (240 kW) power which gave the submarine a maximum surface speed of 13 knots (24 km/h; 15 mph) and a submerged speed of 11 knots (20 km/h; 13 mph). She would normally carry 16.4 long tons (16.7 t) of fuel and had a maximum capacity of 18 long tons (18 t) and a range of 1,600 nautical miles (2,963 km; 1,841 mi). The boat was armed with a 6-pounder (2.7 kg) Hotchkiss quick-firing gun and four 18-inch (457 mm) bow torpedo tubes with six 18-inch (457 mm) torpedoes carried. The complement was twenty-two crew members.
