= SS Mantola =

At least two ships of the British-India Steam Navigation Company have been named SS Mantola:

- SS Mantola (1916) was a passenger steamship launched in 1916 and sunk by a German U-boat in 1917.
- SS Mantola (1921) was a passenger steamship launched in 1921 and scrapped in 1953.
