= German submarine U-135 =

U-135 may refer to one of the following German submarines:

- SM U-135, a Type U 127 submarine launched in 1917 and that served in the First World War until surrendered on 20 November 1918; grounded on east coast of England on way to be broken up in 1921
  - During the First World War, Germany also had this submarine with a similar name:
    - SM UB-135, a Type UB III submarine ordered in 1917 but not completed by the end of the war
- German submarine U-135 (1941), a Type VIIC submarine that served in the Second World War until sunk 15 July 1943
