= SM U-19 (Germany) =

Imperial German Navy submarine

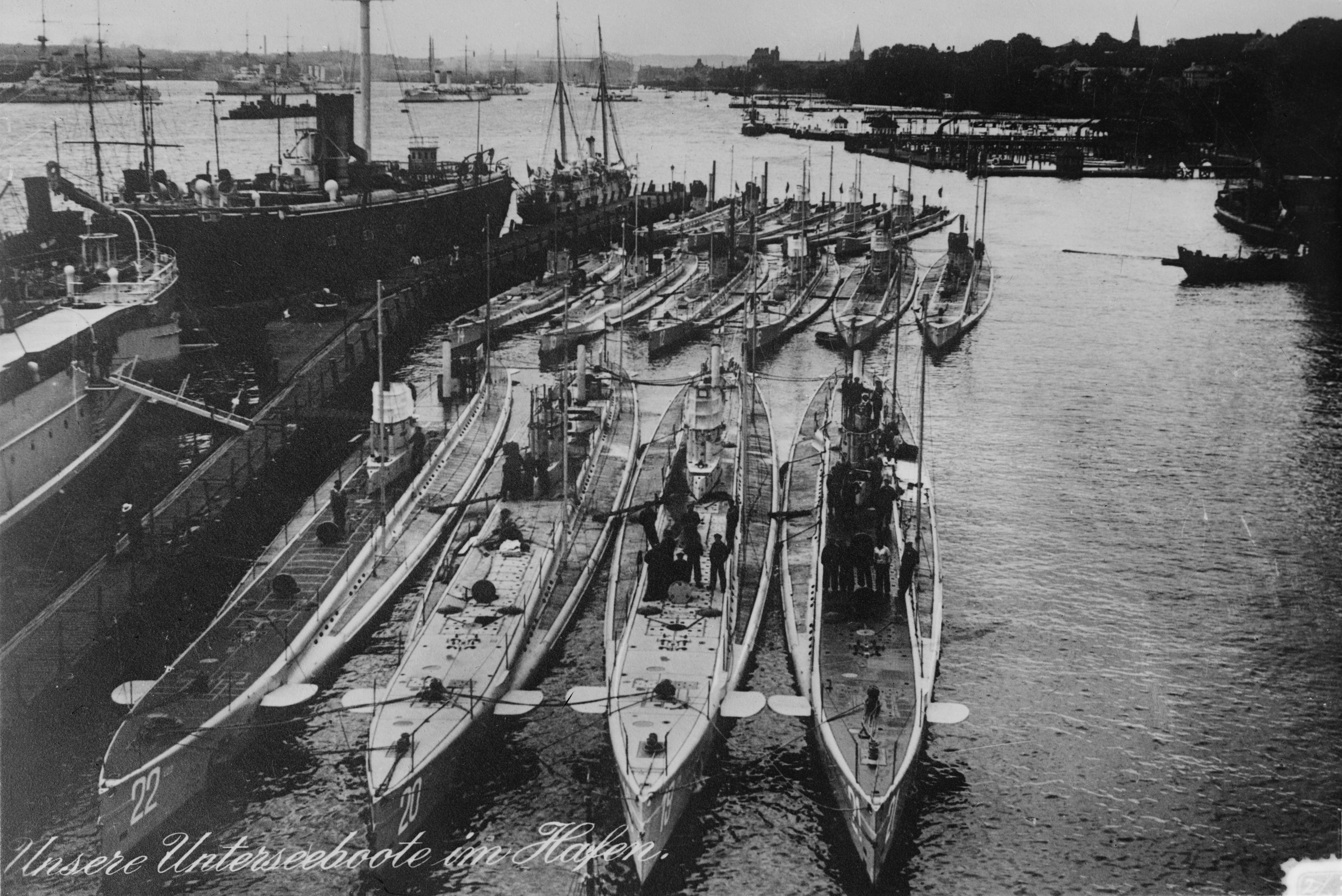
- SM U-19 (first row, second from the right)

History

Germany
- Name: U-19
- Ordered: 25 November 1910
- Builder: Kaiserliche Werft Danzig
- Cost: 2,450,000 Goldmark
- Yard number: 13
- Laid down: 20 October 1911
- Launched: 10 October 1912
- Commissioned: 6 July 1913
- Fate: Surrendered 24 November 1918.

General characteristics
- Class & type: Type U 19 submarine
- Displacement: 650 t (640 long tons) surfaced; 837 t (824 long tons) submerged
- Length: 64.15 m (210 ft 6 in)
- Beam: 6.10 m (20 ft 0 in)
- Height: 7.30 m (23 ft 11 in)
- Draught: 3.58 m (11 ft 9 in)
- Propulsion: 2 shafts; 2 × MAN 8-cylinder two stroke diesel motors with 1,700 PS (1,677 bhp; 1,250 kW); 2 × AEG double modyn with 1,200 PS (1,184 shp; 883 kW); 320 rpm submerged
- Speed: 15.4 knots (28.5 km/h; 17.7 mph) surfaced; 9.5 knots (17.6 km/h; 10.9 mph) submerged
- Range: 9,700 nmi (18,000 km; 11,200 mi) at 8 kn surfaced; 80 nmi (150 km; 92 mi) at 5 kn submerged
- Test depth: 50 m (164 ft 1 in)
- Complement: 4 officers, 31 men
- Armament: 4 × 50 cm (19.7 in) torpedo tubes (2 each bow and stern) with 6 torpedoes; 1 × 8.8 cm (3.5 in) SK L/30 gun (from 1916 2 ×); 1 × 10.5 cm (4.1 in) SK L/45 gun (from 1917)

Service record
- Part of: III Flottille; 1 August 1914 – 19 September 1916; Baltic Flotilla; 19 September 1916 - 1 May 1917; III Flottille; 1 May 1917 – 11 November 1918
- Commanders: Kptlt. Constantin Kolbe; 1 August 1914 – 15 March 1916; Kptlt. Raimund Weisbach; 16 March – 10 August 1916; Oblt.z.S. Johannes Spieß; 11 August 1916 – 4 July 1917; Lt.z.S. Heinrich Koch; 5 July 1917 – 15 October 1917; Oblt.z.S. Hans Albrecht Liebeskind; 25 October – 16 November 1917; Kptlt. Johannes Spieß; 17 November 1917 – 31 May 1918; Oblt.z.S. Hans Albrecht Liebeskind; 1 June – 11 November 1918
- Operations: 12 patrols
- Victories: 54 merchant ships sunk (80,747 GRT); 4 auxiliary warships sunk (18,435 GRT); 1 merchant ship damaged (3,767 GRT); 2 auxiliary warships damaged (457 GRT); 1 merchant ship taken as prize (733 GRT)

SM U-19 was a German Type U-19 U-boat built for the Imperial German Navy. Her construction was ordered on 25 November 1910, and her keel was laid down on 20 October 1911, at the Kaiserliche Werft Danzig. She was launched on 10 October 1912, and commissioned into the Imperial German Navy on 6 July 1913.

== Service ==
From 1 August 1914, to 15 March 1916, U-19 was commanded by Constantin Kolbe. During this period she had the unfortunate distinction of becoming the first U-boat casualty of World War I when she was rammed by HMS Badger on 24 October 1914. Her hull was badly damaged, but she survived and was repaired.

On 22 January 1915 the Durward was near the Maas lightship when they saw U-19 on the surface. They tried to escape, but as they could only manage 12 knots they were unable to do so. The mate of Durward, who was later interviewed by the Daily Mail special correspondent in Rotterdam related how the second officer, who spoke excellent English, had ordered them to lower a boat and come to talk to them. The captain and crew were given ten minutes to leave the ship. The mate asked the second officer whether he could return to the ship to collect his clothes. He replied "Sorry, old man, it can't be done. I am in the mercantile marine myself, having been in the North German Lloyd service but now I am doing a bit for my country." The commander of the U-boat towed the lifeboat to within 100 yards of the Maas lightship, even stopping at one stage to repair the tow when it parted, after which the crew of Durward said goodbye to the submarine and rowed to the lightship.

Kolbe was relieved by Raimund Weisbach, who had previously served as torpedo officer on U-20 and had (on Kapitänleutnant Walther Schwieger's orders) launched the torpedo that sank RMS Lusitania. During his brief command, Weisbach carried out an unusual mission: he delivered the revolutionary Roger Casement and two other agents to Banna Strand in Ireland in hopes that they would foment an uprising that would distract the United Kingdom of Great Britain and Ireland from World War I.

Weisbach was relieved on 11 August 1916, by Johannes_Spieß, who was relieved in turn on 1 June 1917, by Heinrich Koch. Koch turned the boat over on 25 October 1917, to Hans Albrecht Liebeskind, who commanded for less than a month before being relieved on 17 November 1917, by Spiess again. On 1 June 1918, Liebeskind took over again and commanded U-19 until the end of the war.

U-19 conducted 12 patrols, sinking 58 ships totalling 99,182 combined tons, including Santa Maria (5,383 GRT) off Lough Swilly on 25 February 1918, Tiberia (4,880 GRT) off Black Head near Larne on 26 February 1918, and HMS Calgarian (12,515 GRT) off Rathlin Island on 1 March 1918.

== Fate ==
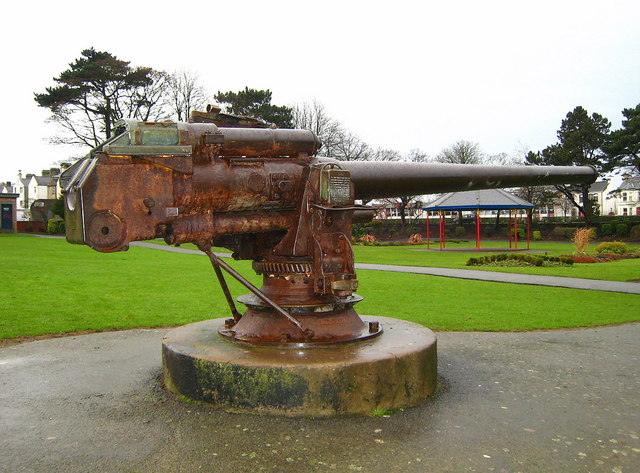
U-19's gun today

On 11 November 1918, U-19 was surrendered to the British, and was broken up at Blyth sometime in 1919 or 1920.

The main gun of U19 was donated to the people of Bangor, Co. Down and today sits near the War Memorial in the town's Ward Park. It was donated by the Admiralty in recognition of the valorous conduct of Commander The Hon. Edward Bingham whilst on board HMS Nestor while fighting in the Battle of Jutland in July 1916, for which he received the Victoria Cross.

== Summary of raiding history ==
Date	Name	Nationality	Tonnage (Note: Merchant ship tonnages are in gross register tons. Military vessels are listed by tons displacement.)	Fate
21 January 1915	Durward	United Kingdom	1,301	Sunk
2 June 1915	Salvador	Denmark	165	Sunk
3 June 1915	Chrysoprasus	United Kingdom	119	Sunk
3 June 1915	Dogberry	United Kingdom	214	Sunk
3 June 1915	Ena May	United Kingdom	90	Sunk
3 June 1915	Iona	United Kingdom	3,344	Sunk
3 June 1915	Kathleen	United Kingdom	92	Sunk
3 June 1915	Strathbran	United Kingdom	163	Sunk
4 June 1915	Cortes	United Kingdom	174	Sunk
4 June 1915	Dunnet Head	United Kingdom	343	Sunk
4 June 1915	Ebenezer	United Kingdom	113	Sunk
4 June 1915	Evening Star	United Kingdom	120	Sunk
4 June 1915	Explorer	United Kingdom	156	Sunk
4 June 1915	Petrel	United Kingdom	182	Sunk
5 June 1915	Adolf	Russian Empire	169	Sunk
5 June 1915	Bardolph	United Kingdom	215	Sunk
5 June 1915	Curlew	United Kingdom	134	Sunk
5 June 1915	Gazehound	United Kingdom	138	Sunk
5 June 1915	Persimon	United Kingdom	255	Sunk
5 June 1915	Star of the West	United Kingdom	197	Sunk
6 June 1915	Japonica	United Kingdom	145	Sunk
6 June 1915	Dromio	United Kingdom	208	Sunk
9 June 1915	Svein Jarl	Norway	1,135	Sunk
11 June 1915	Otago	Sweden	1,410	Sunk
11 June 1915	Plymouth	United Kingdom	165	Sunk
11 June 1915	Waago	United Kingdom	154	Sunk
16 July 1915	HMT Cameo	Royal Navy	172	Damaged
21 April 1916	Feliciana	United Kingdom	4,283	Sunk
22 April 1916	Jozsef Agost Foherzeg	Kingdom of Italy	2,680	Sunk
22 April 1916	Ross	United Kingdom	2,666	Sunk
23 April 1916	Parisiana	United Kingdom	4,763	Sunk
23 April 1916	Ribston	United Kingdom	3,048	Sunk
25 April 1916	Carmanian	Norway	1,840	Sunk
12 September 1916	Elizabeth	Imperial Russian Navy	4,444	Sunk
12 September 1916	Ije (N-18)	Imperial Russian Navy	1,261	Sunk
22 September 1916	Kennett	United Kingdom	1,679	Sunk
12 May 1917	Wirral	United Kingdom	4,207	Sunk
17 May 1917	Vesterland	Sweden	3,832	Sunk
20 May 1917	Arnfinn Jarl	Norway	1,097	Sunk
26 May 1917	Norway	Norway	1,447	Sunk
27 May 1917	Debora	Denmark	159	Sunk
20 June 1917	Fido	Norway	1,459	Sunk
21 June 1917	Black Head	United Kingdom	1,898	Sunk
21 June 1917	Laatefos	Norway	1,458	Sunk
22 June 1917	Bolette	Norway	1,431	Sunk
31 August 1917	Miniota	United Kingdom	6,422	Sunk
1 September 1917	Akaroa	Norway	1,348	Sunk
12 September 1917	Agricola	United Kingdom	65	Sunk
28 December 1917	Maxton	United Kingdom	5,094	Sunk
28 December 1917	Santa Amalia	United Kingdom	4,309	Sunk
2 January 1918	Nadejda	Russian SFSR	3,849	Sunk
25 February 1918	Santa Maria	United States	5,383	Sunk
25 February 1918	Appalachee	United Kingdom	3,767	Damaged
26 February 1918	Tiberia	United Kingdom	4,880	Sunk
1 March 1918	HMS Calgarian	Royal Navy	12,515	Sunk
1 March 1918	HMT Thomas Collard	Royal Navy	215	Sunk
1 March 1918	HMT Lord Lister	Royal Navy	285	Damaged
6 April 1918	Sterne	Netherlands	108	Sunk
21 April 1918	Delta A	Belgium	241	Sunk
23 April 1918	Peregrine	United Kingdom	79	Sunk
23 April 1918	Tyne Wave	United Kingdom	121	Sunk
25 April 1918	Hollandia I	Netherlands	733	Captured as prize
