= SS Mantola (1916) =

British cargo liner sunk in the First World War

History

United Kingdom
- Name: Mantola
- Owner: British India SN Co
- Port of registry: Glasgow
- Route: intended: London – Bombay; actual: London – Calcutta
- Builder: Barclay, Curle & Co, Whiteinch
- Cost: £146,700
- Yard number: 514
- Launched: 22 March 1916
- Completed: 6 June 1916
- Identification: UK official number 137815; code letters JMSL
- Fate: Sunk by torpedo, 1917

General characteristics
- Class & type: "M" class cargo liner
- Tonnage: 8,253 GRT, 5,131 NRT, 10,370 DWT
- Length: 450.4 ft (137.3 m)
- Beam: 58.2 ft (17.7 m)
- Depth: 32.7 ft (10.0 m)
- Installed power: 4,050 ihp
- Propulsion: 2 × triple expansion engines; 2 × screws
- Speed: 13.7 knots (25.4 km/h)
- Capacity: 66 × 1st class; 61 × 2nd class
- Crew: 165
- Armament: 1 × 4.7-inch gun
- Notes: sister ships: Malda, Manora, Mashobra, Merkara, Mandala, Margha

SS Mantola was a British India Steam Navigation Company (BI) steamship that was built in 1916 and sunk by a German U-boat in 1917. She belonged to BI's "M" class of cargo liners. She was carrying an estimated 600,000 ounces of silver bullion when she was sunk. In 2017, 526 bars of silver were salvaged from the wreck and taken to the United Kingdom, in circumstances that remain undisclosed.

This was the first of two BI ships called Mantola. The second was a turbine ship that was built in 1921 and scrapped in 1953.

== Building ==
Between 1913 and 1917 Barclay, Curle & Co of Whiteinch in Glasgow built a set of sister ships for BI. Malda and Manora were launched in 1913. Mashobra and Merkara were launched in 1914. Mandala was launched in 1915, Mantola in 1916, and Margha in 1917.

BI had ordered two other ships of the same class from Barclay, Curle, but the Admiralty requisitioned them while they were being built, and had them completed as fleet oilers. Yard numbers 538 and 539 were laid down as Margha and Masula, requisitioned as Oligarch and Olinda, launched in 1916, and completed as Limeleaf and Boxleaf.

Barclay, Curle built Mantola as yard number 514, launched her on 22 March 1916, and completed her on 6 June for £146,700. Her registered length was 450.4 ft (137.3 m), her beam was 58.2 ft (17.7 m) and the depth of her cargo holds was 32.7 ft (10.0 m). Her tonnages were 8,253 GRT, 5,131 NRT, and 10,370 DWT. She had berths for 127 passengers: 66 in first class and 61 in second class.

Mantola had twin screws, each driven by a three-cylinder triple expansion engine. The combined power of her twin engines was rated at 4,050 ihp. She achieved 13.7 knots (25.4 km/h) on her sea trials. She carried one 4.7-inch gun as defensive armament.

== Career ==
BI registered Mantola at Glasgow. Her United Kingdom official number was 137815 and her code letters were JMSL.

BI intended Mantola for its passenger service between London and Bombay (now Mumbai). Her maiden voyage to India was for BI's parent company P&O.

On 30 October 1916 Mantola was steaming from Middlesbrough to London when she struck a mine in the North Sea off Aldeburgh at position 52°09′N 1°52′E. Her number 1 hold was holed, but she remained afloat and reached port.

== Loss ==
On 4 February 1917 Mantola left London for Calcutta in India carrying 165 crew, 18 passengers, general cargo, and 600,000 ounces of silver. Her Master was Captain David James Chivas, a member of the Chivas Brothers Scotch whisky family.

On 8 February Mantola was in the Western Approaches, about 143 nautical miles (265 km) west-southwest of Fastnet Rock, steaming at full speed and steering a zigzag course. U-81 fired a torpedo at her, which hit her abreast of her bridge, and rupturing subsidiary steam pipes, and releasing clouds of steam. Captain Chivas gave the order to abandon ship, with only himself, the Chief Engineer, and the wireless operator remaining aboard. Seven of her lascar crew were killed, either when the torpedo exploded, or because one of her lifeboats capsized while being launched (reports differ).

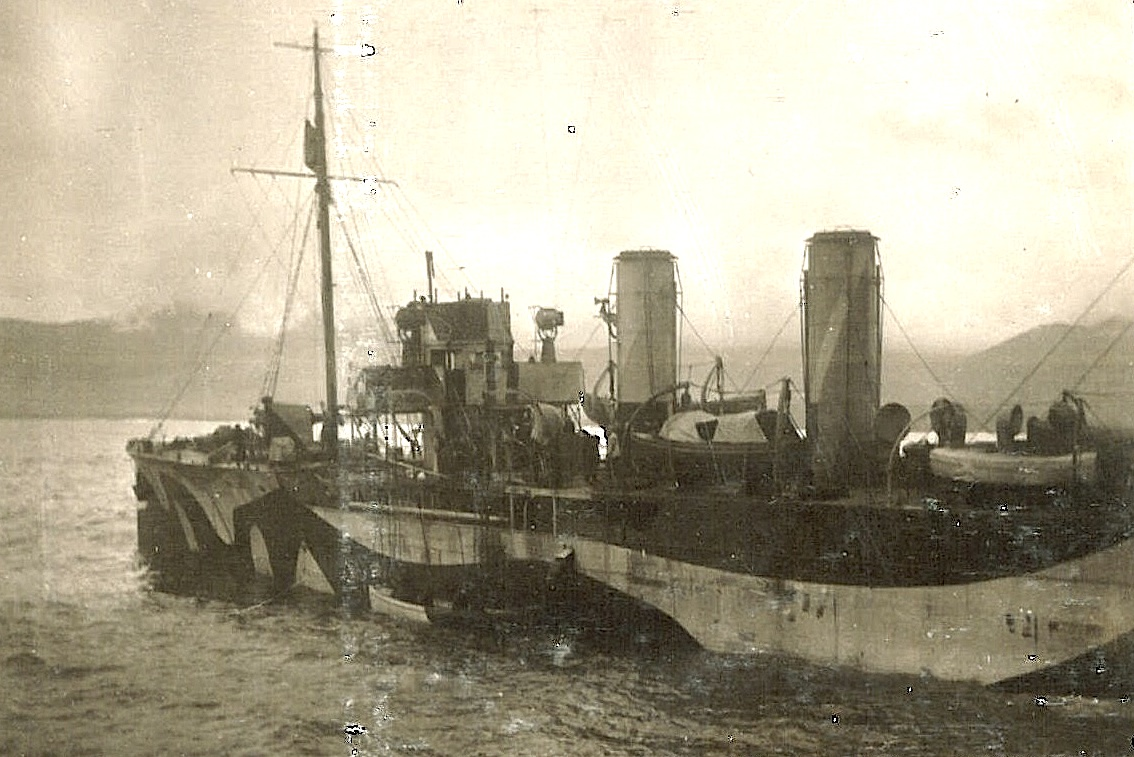
HMS Laburnum in 1917

After about 90 minutes U-81 opened fire with her 105 mm deck gun from a range of 4,000 yards (3,700 metres). According to one account, it was in retaliation for the Chief Engineer and Radio Operator getting the wireless working, and transmitting an SOS signal. According to other accounts, it was because a party from the lifeboats tried to reboard the ship. A passenger in one of the lifeboats counted 47 rounds fired, during which time U-81 closed to a range of 200 to 300 yards (180 to 270 metres) from the ship. Then sloop HMS Laburnum approached, so U-81 submerged and left the area.

On the morning of 9 February Mantola was still afloat, so Laburnum tried to tow her, stern-first. However, the sea became rougher, and Laburnum made no headway, so Mantola was abandoned. Soon afterward she sank at position 49°50′16″N 13°06′12″W.

The silver had war risk insurance, and the UK Ministry of Shipping paid £110,000 for the loss.

== Salvage and court case ==
In 1941 a different U-boat, U-101, sank a different BI ship, Gairsoppa, which was carrying an even larger amount of silver: about 7,000,000 ounces. Gairsoppa sank at position 50°00′N 14°0′W, only about 60 nautical miles (110 km) from Mantola. In 2011 the UK Government contracted a US company, Odyssey Marine Exploration, to find both wrecks and salvage the silver. The terms of the UK Government contract were that Odyssey was to keep 80 percent of the value of the silver, with and 20 percent would go to HM Treasury.

On 25 September 2011 Odyssey announced that, using an ROV, it had found and identified Gairsoppa's wreck. It is on the seabed at a depth of nearly 4,700 metres (3 miles). A fortnight later Odyssey announced that it had found Mantola's wreck at a depth of about 2,400 metres (1.5 miles).

Odyssey worked on Gairsoppa first, salvaging 110 tons of silver from her wreck in 2012 and 2013. Odyssey also salvaged the ship's bell and a piece of silk cloth from Mantola. However, Odyssey had not started to recover Mantola's silver bullion by September 2015, when its contract with the UK Government lapsed.

In April 2017 "an unspecified United Kingdom entity" removed the 526 silver ingots from the wreck, took them to the UK, and deposited them with the Receiver of Wreck. That same month, Odyssey responded by bringing an action in the United States District Court for the Southern District of New York in rem against Mantola's wreck, and seeking disclosure of the identity of the party that salvaged the silver.

In February 2018 the UK Department for Transport admitted that the salvage had taken place. However, it contended that Odyssey had no right to disclosure of the salvor's identity. The District Court dismissed the DfT's motion, but also denied as unripe Odyssey's request for disclosure.

== Bibliography ==
- Haws, Duncan (1987). British India S.N. Co. Merchant Fleets. Vol. 11. Burwash: Travel Creatours Ltd Publications. ISBN 0-946378-07-X.
- Mercantile Navy List. London. 1917 – via Crew List Index Project.
