= Raimund Weisbach =

- Born: 16 September 1886; Breslau, German Empire
- Died: 16 June 1970 (aged 83); Hamburg, West Germany
- Military career
- Allegiance: German Empire
- Branch: Imperial German Navy
- Rank: Kapitänleutnant
- Commands: U-19, 16 March – 10 August 1916; U-81, 22 August 1916 – 1 May 1917
- Conflicts: U-boat Campaign (World War I); Easter Rising
- Awards: Iron Cross 1st class

Raimund Weisbach (16 September 1886 – 16 June 1970) was an officer of the Kaiserliche Marine, and a U-boat commander during the First World War. He was the torpedo officer on the German U-boat, the U-20, who saw to the preparation and firing of the torpedo that sank the RMS Lusitania on 7 May 1915. He went on to become a successful commander, sinking 36 ships before being captured when his submarine was sunk by the Royal Navy.

== Lusitania ==
Born in Breslau on 16 September 1886, Weisbach joined the Kaiserliche Marine. He was the watch officer aboard U-20 under Kapitänleutnant Walther Schwieger, when the Lusitania was torpedoed and sunk on 7 May 1915. Weisbach was awarded the Iron Cross 1st Class.

Weisbach provided a concise account of his recollection of the sinking of the Lusitania which was published in The Irish Times in 1970 after his death. After the torpedo was fired, he was called to the periscope. He said the explosion which he saw was far more severe than could normally have been expected. He surmised then and still believed in 1966 (when being interviewed) that the liner must have been carrying a significant cargo of high explosives.

== Sir Roger Casement ==
Not long after the sinking of Lusitania, Weisbach received his first independent command, the U-19, on 16 March 1916. On 20 April 1916, on the island of Heligoland, Roger Casement embarked as a passenger aboard U-19. Their destination was Ireland. He delivered Casement to Tralee Bay a few days later. Weisbach was an official guest of the Government of Ireland at the commemoration of the 50th anniversary of the 1916 Rising in 1966. Weisbach came from his home in Hamburg to attend.

== Later career ==
Weisbach commanded U-19 until 10 August 1916. His next command was U-81, which he took over on 22 August 1916. During his time in command Weisbach's submarines sunk 36 ships for a total of 107,763 GRT, and damaged another two for a total of 3,481 GRT. U-81 was torpedoed and sunk by the British submarine HMS E54 on 1 May 1917. 24 members of the U-boat crew were killed, with Weisbach, his watch officer Otto Walter and five other Germans surviving to be rescued by the British. Weisbach and the surviving crew spent the rest of the war as prisoners in Britain.

Weisbach returned to Germany after the end of the war. He visited Cork and Dublin in 1966 for the Easter rising celebrations, and died in Hamburg on 16 June 1970.

== Sources ==
- The Irish Sword, The Journal of the Military History Society of Ireland, Vol. XVI (Summer 1986)(No.64) - John De Courcey Ireland article concerning Weisbach
- Obituary in The Irish Times, 28 July 1970, p. 10.
- Helgason, Guðmundur. "WWI U-boat commanders: Raimund Weisbach". German and Austrian U-boats of World War I - Kaiserliche Marine - Uboat.net.
