= SM U-81 =

History

German Empire
- Name: U-81
- Ordered: 23 June 1915
- Builder: Germaniawerft, Kiel
- Yard number: 251
- Laid down: 31 August 1915
- Launched: 24 June 1916
- Commissioned: 22 August 1916
- Fate: Torpedoed and sunk 1 May 1917

General characteristics
- Displacement: 808 t (795 long tons) surfaced; 946 t (931 long tons) submerged
- Length: 70.06 m (229 ft 10 in) (o/a); 55.55 m (182 ft 3 in) (pressure hull)
- Beam: 6.30 m (20 ft 8 in) (oa); 4.15 m (13 ft 7 in) (pressure hull)
- Height: 8.00 m (26 ft 3 in)
- Draught: 4.02 m (13 ft 2 in)
- Installed power: 2 × 2,400 PS (1,765 kW; 2,367 shp) surfaced; 2 × 1,200 PS (883 kW; 1,184 shp) submerged
- Propulsion: 2 shafts, 2 × 1.70 m (5 ft 7 in) propellers
- Speed: 16.8 knots (31.1 km/h; 19.3 mph) surfaced; 9.1 knots (16.9 km/h; 10.5 mph) submerged
- Range: 11,220 nmi (20,780 km; 12,910 mi) at 8 knots (15 km/h; 9.2 mph) surfaced; 56 nmi (104 km; 64 mi) at 5 knots (9.3 km/h; 5.8 mph) submerged
- Test depth: 50 m (160 ft)
- Complement: 4 officers, 31 enlisted
- Armament: 4 × 50 cm (19.7 in) torpedo tubes (two bow, two stern); 12-16 torpedoes; 1 × 10.5 cm (4.1 in) SK L/45 deck gun

Service record
- Part of: IV Flotilla; 18 October 1916 – 1 May 1917
- Commanders: Kptlt. Raimund Weisbach; 22 August 1916 – 1 May 1917
- Operations: 5 patrols
- Victories: 30 merchant ships sunk (88,483 GRT); 2 merchant ships damaged (3,481 GRT)

SM U-81 (Note: "SM" stands for "Seiner Majestät" (English: His Majesty's) and combined with the U for Unterseeboot would be translated as His Majesty's Submarine.) was one of the 329 submarines serving in the Imperial German Navy (Kaiserliche Marine) in World War I. U-81 was engaged in naval warfare and took part in the First Battle of the Atlantic.

U-81 had one 10.5 cm gun with 140–240 rounds. On 8 February 1917 she torpedoed Mantola 143 nautical miles (265 km; 165 mi) off Fastnet, forcing her crew and passengers to abandon her. She then shelled the drifting hulk until being chased away by the Acacia-class sloop HMS Laburnum. Mantola sank the next day. HMS E54 sank U-81 by torpedo west of Ireland on 1 May 1917 at position 51°33′N 13°38′W. 31 of U-81's crew were killed; seven survived.

== Design ==
Type U 81 submarines were preceded by the shorter Type UE I submarines. U-81 had a displacement of 808 tonnes (795 long tons) when at the surface and 946 tonnes (931 long tons) while submerged. She had a total length of 70.06 m (229 ft 10 in), a pressure hull length of 55.55 m (182 ft 3 in), a beam of 6.30 m (20 ft 8 in), a height of 8 m (26 ft 3 in), and a draught of 4.02 m (13 ft 2 in). The submarine was powered by two 2,400 metric horsepower (1,800 kW; 2,400 shp) engines for use while surfaced, and two 1,200 metric horsepower (880 kW; 1,200 shp) engines for use while submerged. She had two propeller shafts. She was capable of operating at depths of up to 50 metres (160 ft).

The submarine had a maximum surface speed of 16.8 knots (31.1 km/h; 19.3 mph) and a maximum submerged speed of 9.1 knots (16.9 km/h; 10.5 mph). When submerged, she could operate for 56 nautical miles (104 km; 64 mi) at 5 knots (9.3 km/h; 5.8 mph); when surfaced, she could travel 11,220 nautical miles (20,780 km; 12,910 mi) at 8 knots (15 km/h; 9.2 mph). U-81 was fitted with four 50-centimetre (20 in) torpedo tubes (one at the starboard bow and one starboard stern), twelve to sixteen torpedoes, and one 10.5 cm (4.1 in) SK L/45 deck gun. She had a complement of thirty-five (thirty-one crew members and four officers).

== Summary of raiding history ==
Date	Name	Nationality	Tonnage (Note: Tonnages are in gross register tons)	Fate
1 December 1916	Douglas	Sweden	1,177	Sunk
19 December 1916	Nystrand	Norway	1,397	Sunk
2 February 1917	Songdal	Norway	2,090	Sunk
3 February 1917	Port Adelaide	United Kingdom	8,181	Sunk
4 February 1917	Maria	Kingdom of Italy	992	Sunk
5 February 1917	Wartenfels	United Kingdom	4,511	Sunk
7 February 1917	Gravina	United Kingdom	1,242	Sunk
8 February 1917	Mantola	United Kingdom	8,253	Sunk
10 February 1917	Netherlee	United Kingdom	4,227	Sunk
12 February 1917	Hugo Hamilton	Sweden	2,577	Sunk
10 March 1917	Algol	Norway	988	Sunk
10 March 1917	Skreien	Norway	415	Sunk
13 March 1917	Coronda	United Kingdom	2,733	Sunk
14 March 1917	Paignton	United Kingdom	2,017	Sunk
18 March 1917	Pola	United Kingdom	3,061	Sunk
18 March 1917	Trevose	United Kingdom	3,112	Sunk
19 March 1917	Alnwick Castle	United Kingdom	5,900	Sunk
19 March 1917	Frinton	United Kingdom	4,194	Sunk
22 March 1917	Attika	Norway	2,306	Sunk
25 March 1917	C. Sundt	Norway	1,105	Sunk
25 March 1917	Garant	Norway	735	Sunk
25 March 1917	Laly	Norway	1,880	Sunk
24 April 1917	Amulree	United Kingdom	1,145	Sunk
25 April 1917	Glenesk	Norway	1,369	Sunk
25 April 1917	Heathfield	United Kingdom	1,643	Sunk
25 April 1917	Invermay	United Kingdom	1,471	Sunk
27 April 1917	Uranus	Kingdom of Italy	3,978	Sunk
28 April 1917	Jose De Larrinaga	United Kingdom	5,017	Sunk
28 April 1917	Terence	United Kingdom	4,309	Sunk
30 April 1917	Elisabeth	Denmark	217	Damaged
1 May 1917	Dorie	United Kingdom	3,264	Damaged
1 May 1917	San Urbano	United Kingdom	6,458	Sunk

== Bibliography ==
- Gröner, Erich; Jung, Dieter; Maass, Martin (1991). U-boats and Mine Warfare Vessels. German Warships 1815–1945. Vol. 2. Translated by Thomas, Keith; Magowan, Rachel. London: Conway Maritime Press. ISBN 0-85177-593-4.
