= Johannes Spieß =

German U-boat commander during World War I

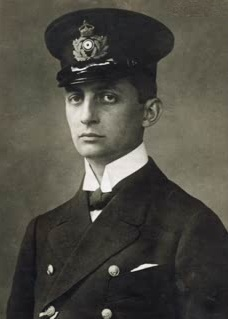
- Born: July 25, 1888; Berlin, German Empire
- Died: 30 March 1972 (aged 83); Hamburg, West Germany
- Spouse: Carola Eckhusen (m. 1923)
- Children: 5
- Military career
- Allegiance: German Empire (1907–1918); Weimar Republic (1918–1920)
- Branch: Imperial German Navy; Reichsmarine
- Service years: 1907–1920, 1940–1944
- Rank: Kapitänleutnant
- Commands: U-9, 12 Jan 1915 – 19 Apr 1916; U-19, 11 Aug 1916 – 4 Jul 1917; U-52, 19 Sep – 29 Oct 1917; U-19, 17 Nov 1917 – 31 May 1918; U-135, 20 Jun – 11 Nov 1918
- Conflicts: U-boat Campaign (World War I)
- Awards: Iron Cross First & Second Class, Military Merit Order (Bavaria), Royal House Order of Hohenzollern

Johannes Spieß (25 July 1888 – 30 March 1972) was an Imperial German Navy U-boat commander during World War I.

After the war ended, he retired from the navy in 1920, and lived through the interwar period of the Weimar Republic, the rise of Nazi Germany, World War II, and the subsequent division of Germany.

== Early life ==
Johannes Spiess was born in Berlin on 25 July 1888, to Max Ernst Paul and Margarethe Amalie Anna Spiess. He had two brothers, both of whom served in the army. Max Spiess (1893–1983) and Theodor Spiess (1890–1962).

Spiess joined the Imperial German Navy as a sea cadet in 1907. He gradually rose through the ranks, where from 1908 till 1910 served as an Ensign on the SMS Braunschweig. Later on, from 1910 until 1912 he served as a Torpedo Officer on the SMS Pommern. In the fall of 1912, he was assigned as a Watch Officer on the U-9 under the command of Otto Weddigen, where he participated in early submarine sea trials.

Impressed by Spiess' service, Weddigen arranged with the Imperial German Navy, for Spiess to remain under his command on U-9. By 1913, he had attained the rank of First Lieutenant.

== World War I ==
At the start of World War I in 1914, he served as the Executive Officer to Otto Weddigen on the same U-boat. A few days later, the U-9 set sail from Heligoland with nine other submarines for her first mission. This first war action by the German submarines failed, since U-13 and U-15 were lost. U-9, battered and with technical problems, had to return to the Imperial Shipyard in Wilhelmshaven.

On 20 September 1914, the U-9 set out from the naval base on Heligoland on a reconnaissance mission westwards. In this mission, Spiess directly experienced the action of 22 September 1914, at the often recounted sinking of the British cruisers HMS Aboukir, HMS Hogue and HMS Cressy. While patrolling in the region of the southern North Sea known to the British as the Broad Fourteens, U-9 intercepted three British warships of the 7th Cruiser Squadron. Spiess had the watch during that early morning and was the first to notice one of the ships in the far horizon. He alerted Weddigen who ordered his crew to submerge. The warships, which were sailing in line, were sighted about 31 mi (50 km) north of Hoek van Holland. After getting close to the cruisers, Weddigen gradually ordered the firing of all six of the U-9 torpedoes, with the crew reloading while submerged. In the space of 95 minutes, the three British armoured cruisers were sunk.

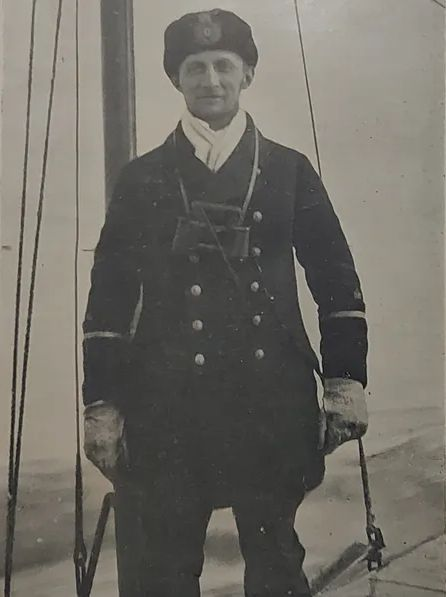
Spiess well dressed in a coat and ushanka hat while out at sea

A few months later due to an injury, Weddigen was forced to hand over command of U-9 to Spiess in January 1915. Spiess was promoted to Kapitänleutnant and remained a submarine commander until the end of the war. Besides U-9, he commanded U-19, U-52 and U-135. During his career as a commander, he sank 41 ships (79,449 GRT) and damaged 2 others (4,052 GRT). His most remarkable victory occurred on 1 March 1918, where in command of U-19, he sank an armed merchant cruiser, HMS Calgarian. For this feat, he was awarded the Royal House Order of Hohenzollern. He was active in the North Sea during the 1915 Restricted Submarine Phase where he sank several British trawlers, patrolled the Baltic Sea during 1915–1916, the English Channel, Irish Sea and again the North Sea in 1917–1918 during the Unrestricted Submarine Phase. He later participated in suppressing the initial German Naval Mutinies in 1918.

Uncommon in Germany at the time, Spiess was fluent in English. This was attested by a number of fishermen he had temporarily taken prisoner after sinking their fishing trawler, but released shortly thereafter. He had also initiated a landing of German military personnel on British shores, on the uninhabited Scottish island of North Rona where he sent a number of his crew to look for eggs of wild birds, and hunt for sheep to obtain mutton. He had ordered the party to go on the top cliff of the island to scout for any enemy vessels which could have been in the area.

== Post-war life and memoirs ==
When World War I ended in November 1918 and with the subsequent Treaty of Versailles imposing restrictions on Germany's military capabilities, Spiess' naval career ended and he became a civilian. After his retirement from the navy, he married Carola Eckhusen in 1923, and later in 1925 he wrote his memoirs in the book "Six Years of Submarine Cruising" ("Sechs Jahre U-Boot Fahrten"). He also translated First Sea Lord, John Jellicoe's Memoirs from English to German.

== World War II ==
Spiess was recalled for duty and was active in several administrative roles. In 1940, he served in the Oberkommando der Wehrmacht propaganda department. Later on, he accompanied the German advance into France to occupy the French naval ministry and then provisionally took over the docks at Nantes and St Nazaire. In 1941, he served with the Abwehr in a station defence role. In 1942, he was appointed Port Commander at La Pallice and St Jean de Luz. In 1942–1943, he was active with Marinegruppenkommando West in Paris, while in 1943–1944 he was active with Oberkommando der Marine. He was dismissed in 1944.

== Later life and death ==
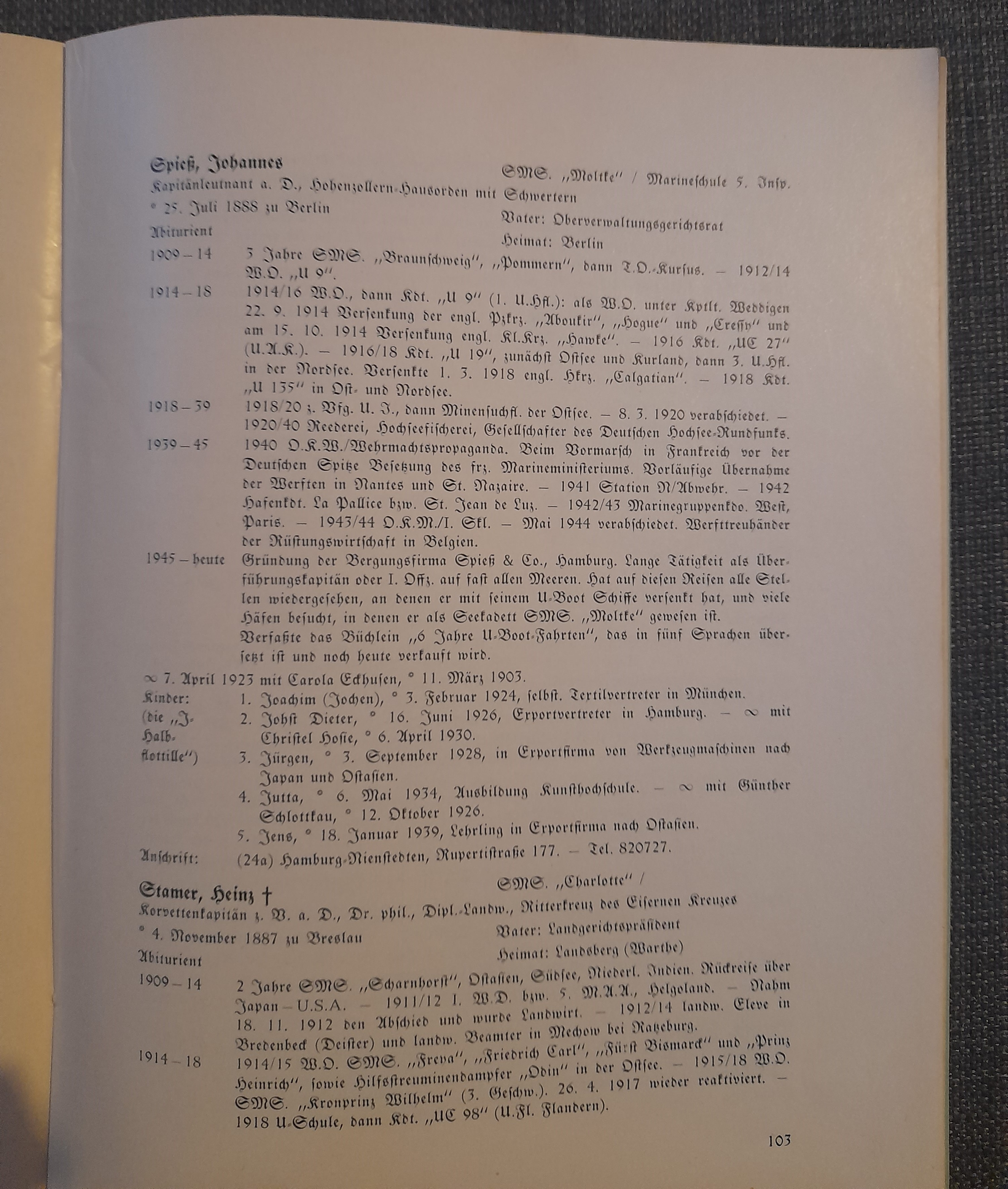
Page 103 of the 'Crew Book' of 1907. It details Spiess' career and family

After the collapse of Nazi regime, Spiess established a salvage company "Spiess & Co." in Hamburg, and also served as a transfer captain or first officer in many naval trips in almost all seas but there is no detailed information regarding these trips. Spiess died in Hamburg on 30 March 1972. His body was cremated and his ashes were placed in an urn grove in the Öjendorf Cemetery.

== Personal life ==
Spiess married Carola Eckhusen (1903–2001) on 7 April 1923. They had 5 children. Joachim (b. 1923), Jobst Dieter (b. 1926), Juergen (b. 1928), Jutta (b. 1934) and Jens (b. 1939). It is interesting to note that all Spiess' children names start with the letter 'J' and had the moniker of "the J half-flottilla". Even though the family lived through the chaos of World War II, they all managed to survive. From this perspective, Spiess seems to have had a blessed life since many naval officers of his generation did not survive both world wars or at least had lost children during World War II.

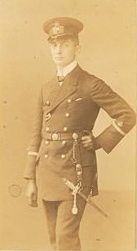
A young Johannes Spiess in military uniform

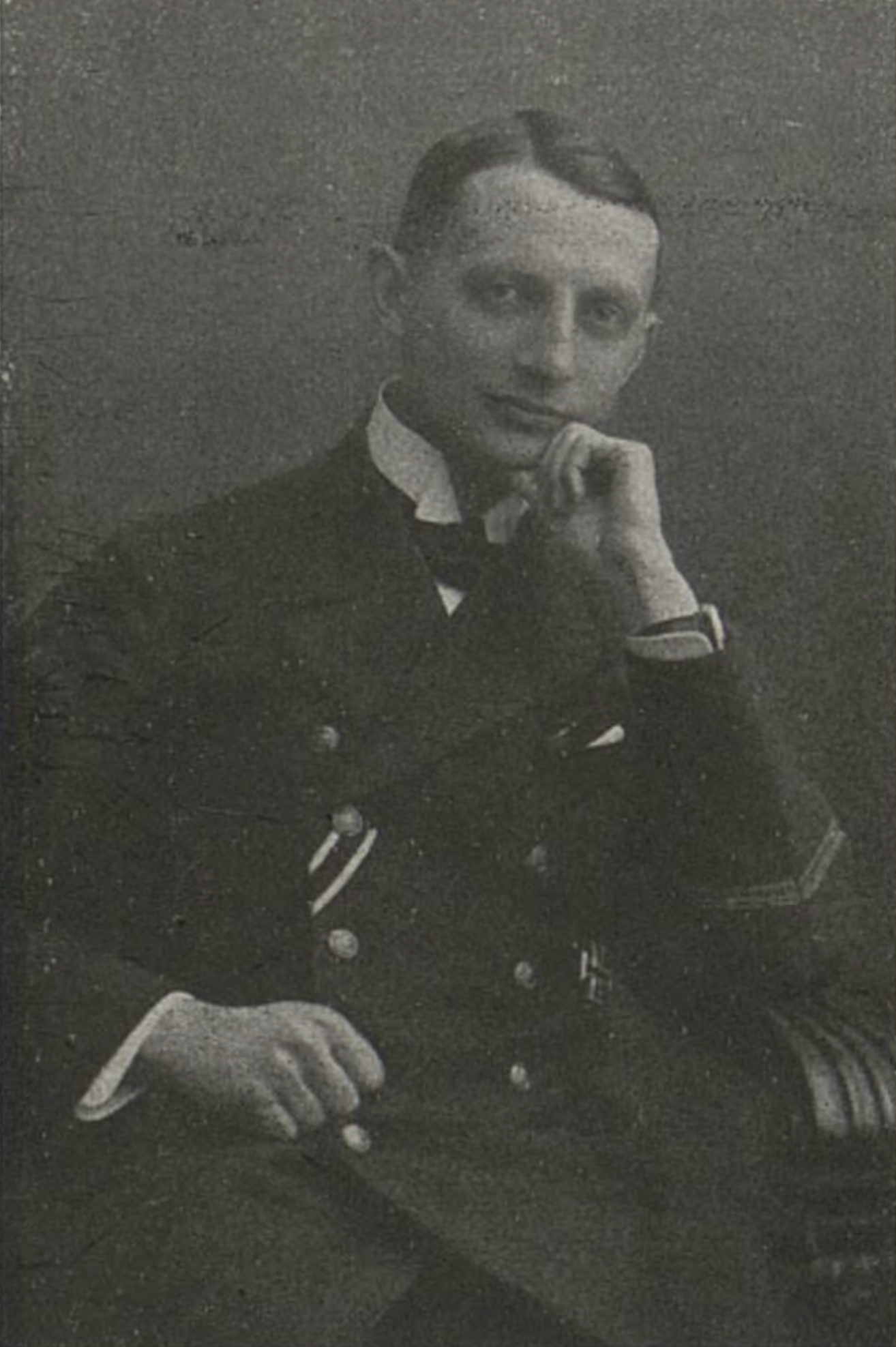
Spiess posing on an armchair

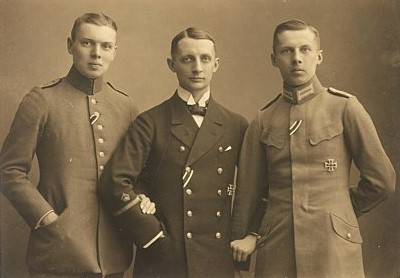
Johannes Spiess (middle) with his two brothers. Max on the left and Theodor on the right.

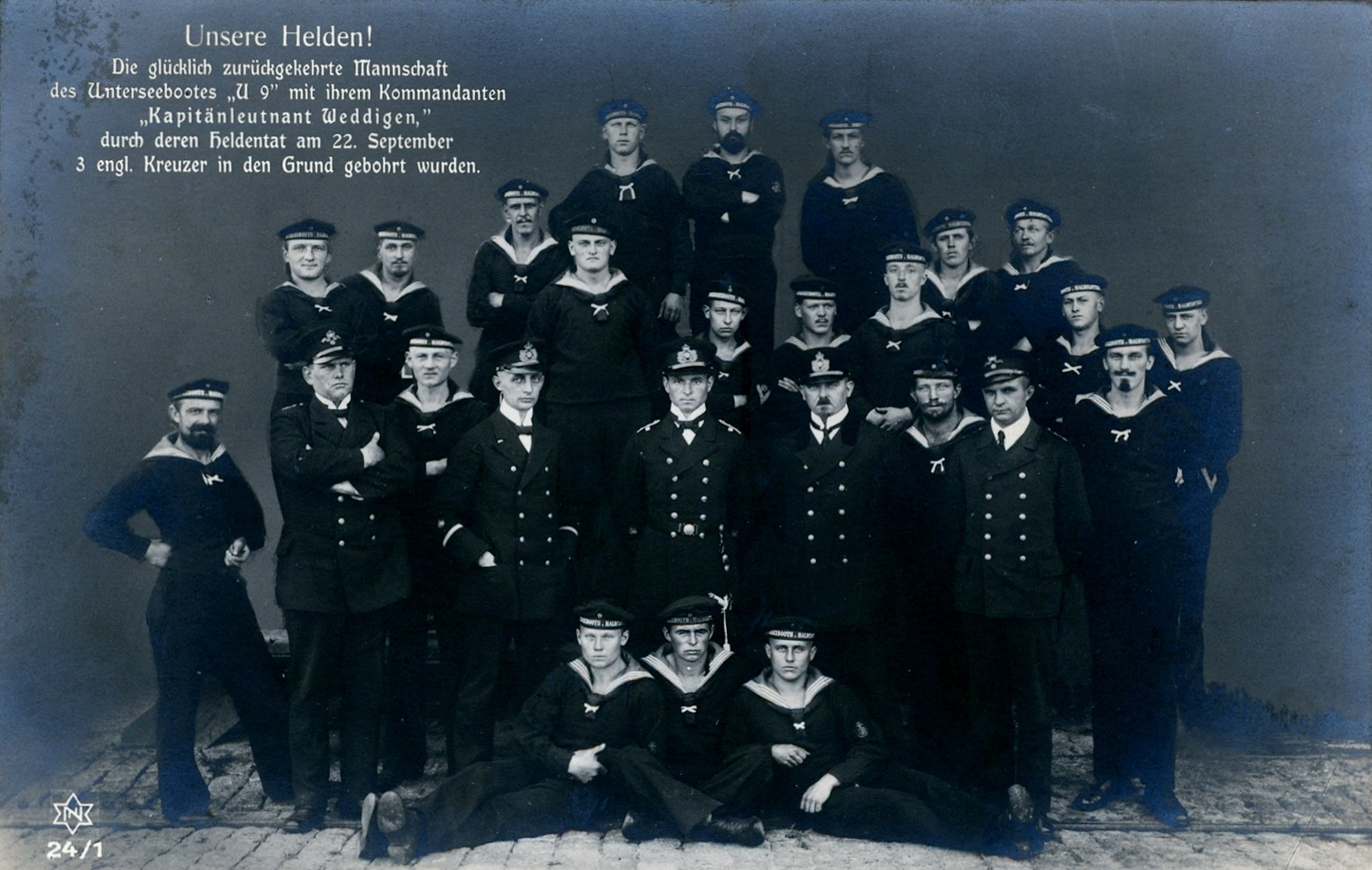
Spiess, first row, 4th from left together with Otto Weddigen and the crew of the U-9

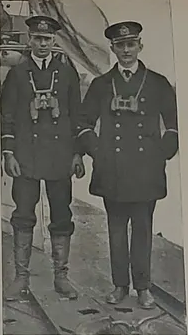
Spiess with his First Officer

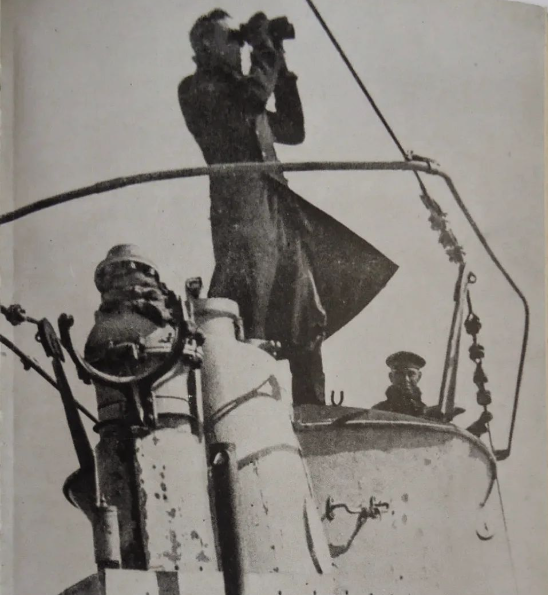
Spiess on watch

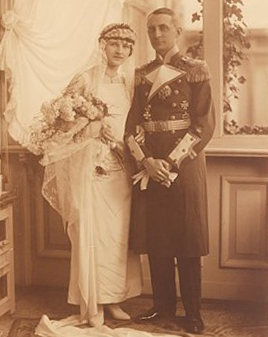
Johannes Spiess with his bride, Carola Eckhusen in 1923

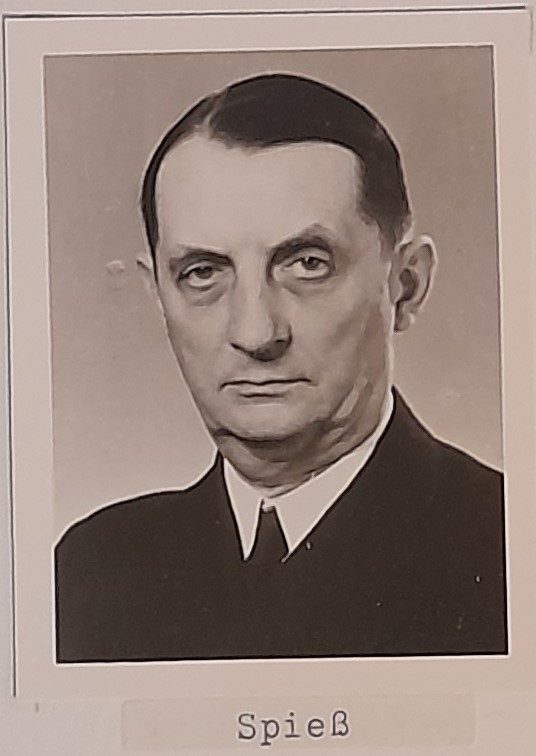
An older Johannes Spiess. Picture was found in the 'Crew Book' of 1907
