= Otto Weddigen =

German World War I U-boat commander (1882–1915)

Otto Eduard Weddigen
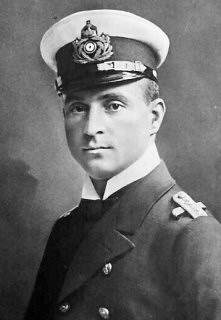
- Born: Otto Eduard Weddigen; 15 September 1882. Herford, Westphalia, German Empire.
- Died: 18 March 1915 (aged 32). Pentland Firth, Scotland.
- Spouse: Irma Victorine Prencke (m. 1914)
- Military career
- Allegiance: German Empire
- Branch: Imperial German Navy
- Service years: 1901–1915
- Rank: Kapitänleutnant
- Commands: U-9, 1 August 1914 – 11 January 1915; U-29, 16 February 1915 – 18 March 1915
- Conflicts: U-boat Campaign (World War I)
- Awards: Pour le Mérite; Iron Cross First & Second Class

Otto Eduard Weddigen (15 September 1882 – 18 March 1915) was an Imperial German Navy U-boat commander during World War I. He was awarded the Pour le Mérite, Germany's highest honour, for sinking four British warships.

== Biography and career ==
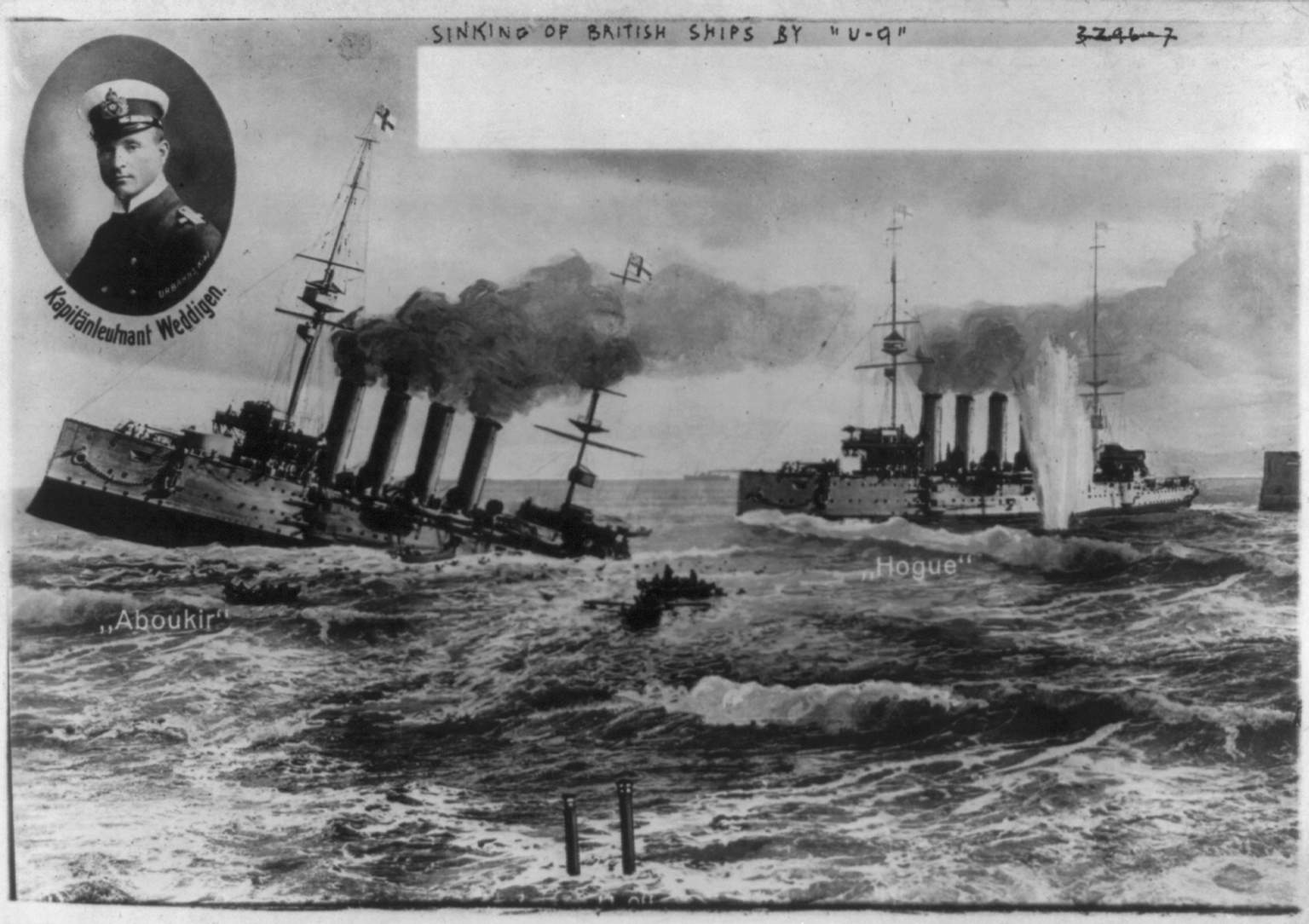
"Victories of U-9" – a contemporary German postcard showing the photo of Weddigen against the background of the sinking Aboukir and Hogue.

Weddigen was born in Herford, in the Prussian province of Westphalia to Eduard and Thusnelde Weddigen (née Humfeld). After a year at the Wilhelmsplatz public school, Weddigen attended the Friedrichs-Gymnasium in his hometown of Herford from 1890 to 1901.

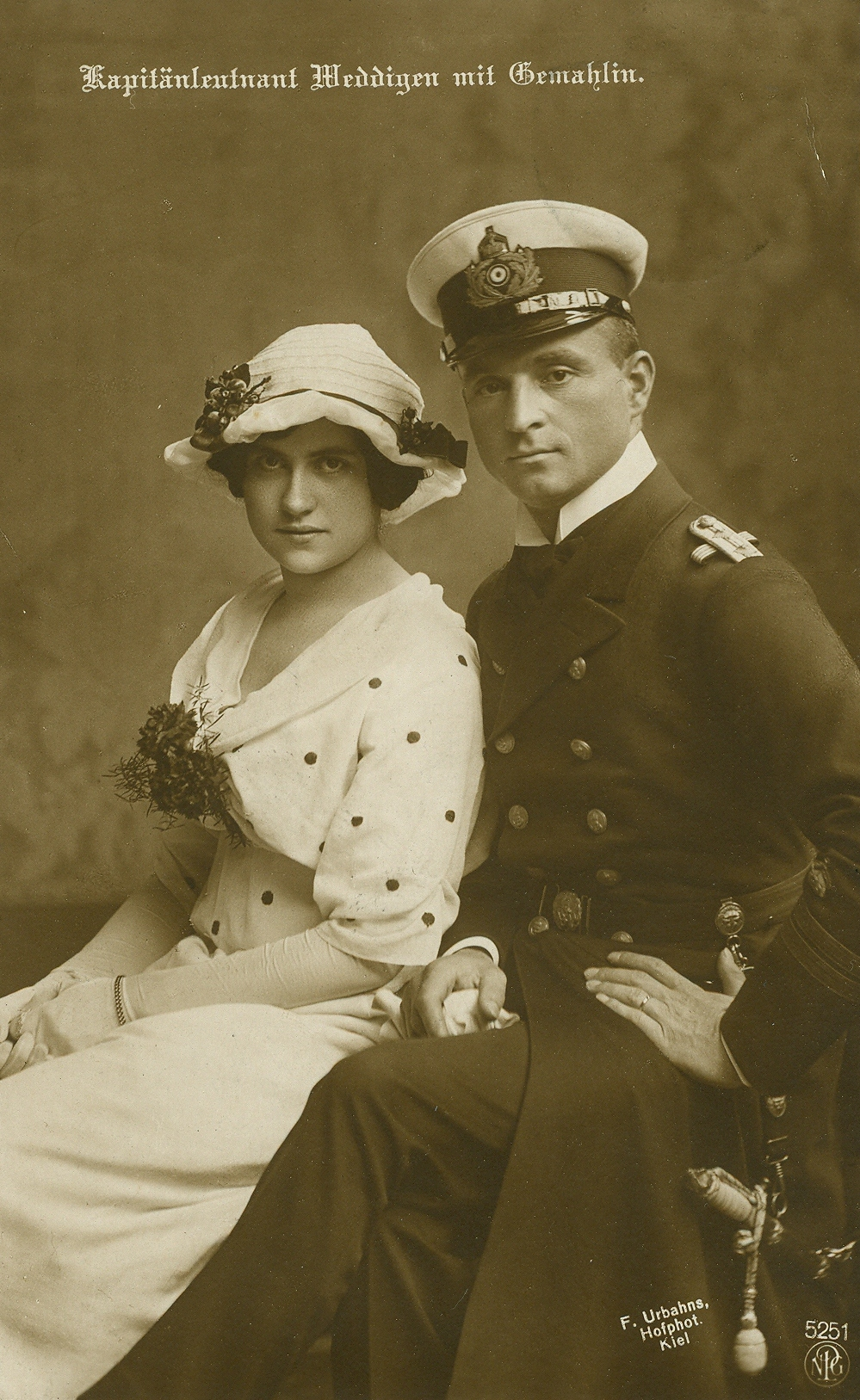
Kapitänleutnant Otto Weddigen and his wife

He started his military career in the Kaiserliche Marine in 1901 as an officer cadet. In contrast to the army, which was still dominated by the Prussian nobility, the Imperial navy offered young men from the middle class opportunities for advancement. In 1902, he was promoted to ensign and in 1904 to lieutenant. In May 1906, Weddigen was transferred to the East Asia Squadron, which was stationed in the German colony of Kiautschou in China. He became officer of the watch on the river gunboat Vaterland and was promoted to first lieutenant. In 1907 he served as officer of the watch on the gunboat Tiger.

Returning to Germany in October 1908, Weddigen joined the U-boat force, which was then being set up. From April 1909 to September 1910 he served as watch officer on U-1, U-2 and U-4. He then received his first own command with U-4. During the next year, he also commanded U-3 and U-5 for a time before becoming commander of U-9, one of the Navy's newest U-boats, on 1 October 1911. Later, on 25 April 1912, Weddigen was promoted to Kapitänleutnant.

A few days after the start of World War I, Weddigen set sail from Heligoland with U-9 and nine other submarines for her first mission. This first war action by the German submarines failed. U-13 and U-15 were lost and U-9, battered and with technical problems, had to return to the Imperial Shipyard in Wilhelmshaven. Weddigen used the weeks of rest to marry Irma Victorine Prencke (1892–1976), a friend from his childhood.

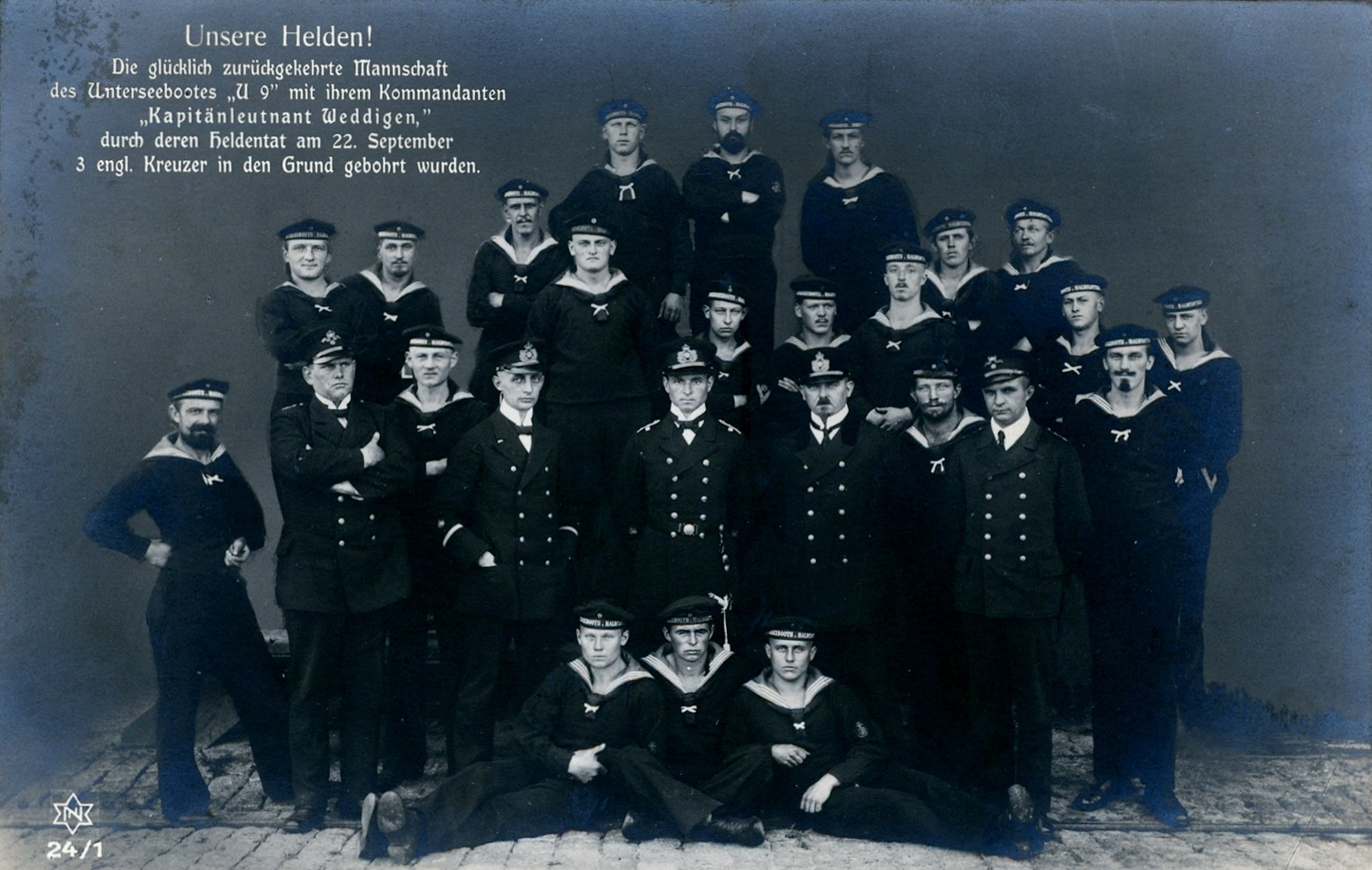
Crew of U-9, prior to receiving their Iron Crosses, welcomed home as heroes

On 20 September 1914, U-9 set out from the naval base on Heligoland on a reconnaissance mission westward. In the early hours of 22 September 1914, while patrolling in the region of the southern North Sea known to the British as the "Broad Fourteens", U-9 intercepted three British warships of the Seventh Cruiser Squadron. The warships, which were sailing in line, were sighted about 50 kilometres (31 mi) north of Hoek van Holland. After getting close to the cruisers, Weddigen gradually ordered the firing of all six of U-9 torpedoes, with the crew reloading while submerged. In the space of 95 minutes, the three British armoured cruisers HMS Aboukir, HMS Hogue and HMS Cressy were sunk.

According to the report of the commander of Cressy, Bertram W. L. Nicholson, an observation post on Aboukir had apparently mistaken the periscope of U-9 for a piece of driftwood. A chance hit in Aboukir's weapons magazine caused a huge explosion and chaos on board the British ship. To make matters worse, when Cressy rushed to help, its crew consisted almost exclusively of less well-trained reservists.

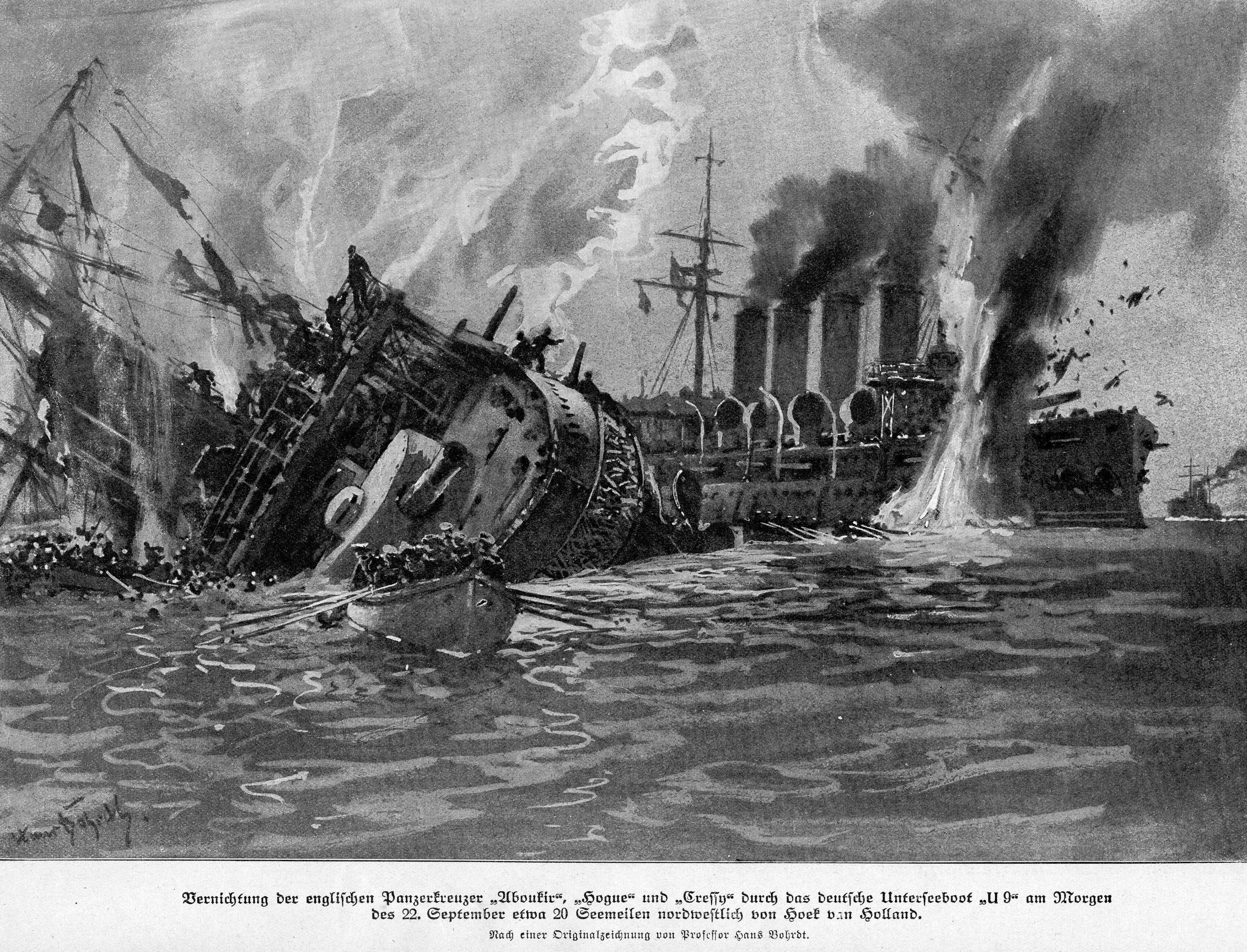
Illustration by Hans Bohrdt depicting the sinking of HMS Cressy, HMS Hogue and HMS Aboukir by U-9 on 22 September 1914 off the Dutch coast.

In a later report, Weddigen openly admitted that, in addition to naval skill, a large portion of luck was also involved in the operation, which was successful for the Germans, and he clearly highlighted what he considered to be the brave conduct of the opposing sailors. The British lost 62 officers and 1,397 other men were killed, leaving 837 survivors which were rescued by a British fishing boat and the Dutch passenger steamers Flora and Titan. Despite being pursued by British ships, U-9 managed to return to Heligoland unscathed. It was then given a triumphant reception in Wilhelmshaven. Weddigen was celebrated as a war hero in the German Empire. The sinking of three enemy ships within a very short period of time established submarines as a means of warfare. For the German submarine force, it was a success that had not been thought possible until then. Weddigen was awarded the Iron Cross, Second and First Class, by Kaiser Wilhelm II. The other crew members received the Iron Cross, Second Class. From then on, the boat U-9 was allowed to display the Iron Cross on its sail.

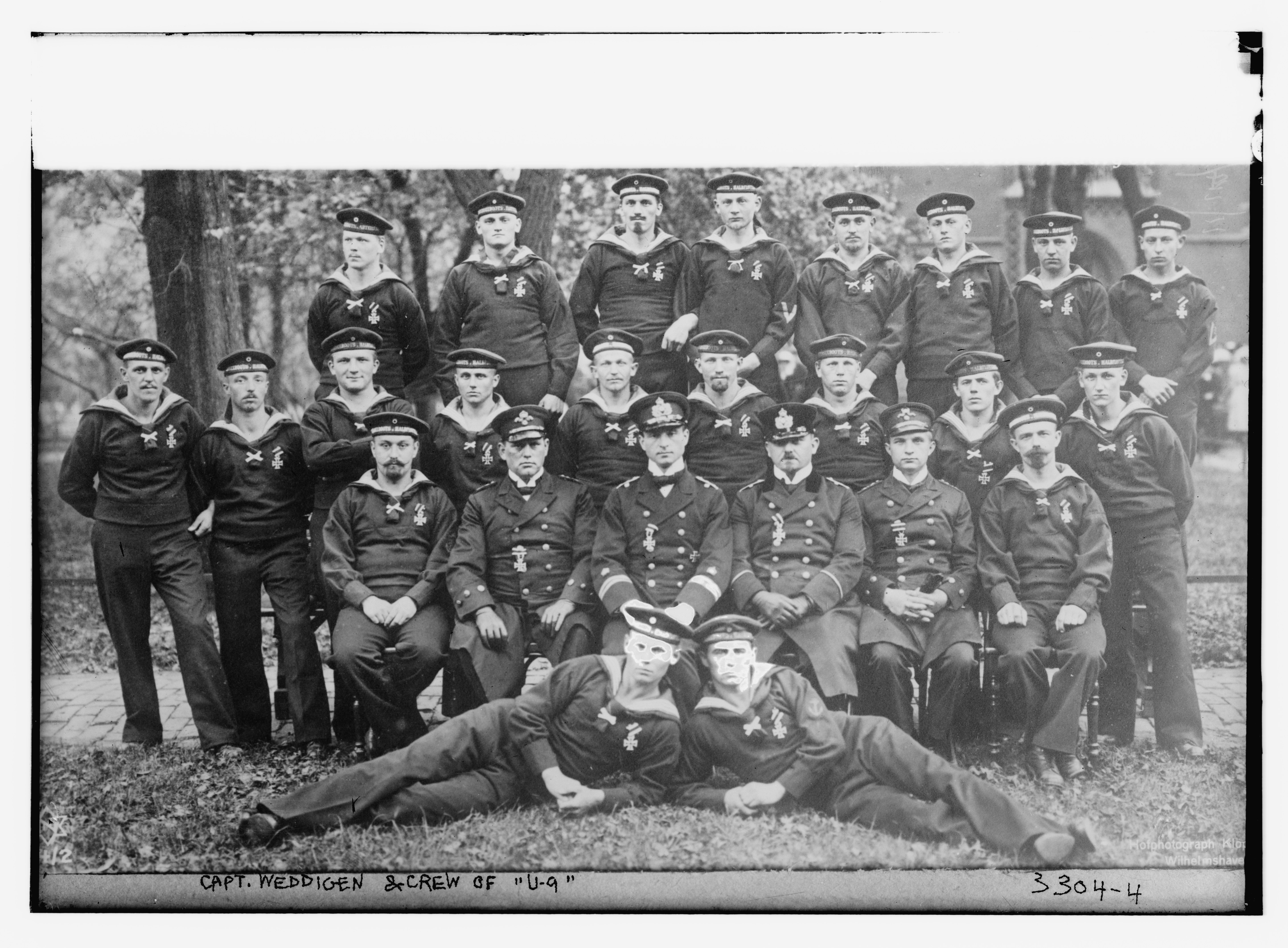
The crew of U-9, all wearing their Iron Cross, Second Class, with Otto Weddigen also wearing his Iron Cross, First Class.

Barely three weeks later on 15 October 1914, after Weddigen sank the British cruiser HMS Hawke off Aberdeen, and three merchant ships, as one of the first German naval officers, he was awarded Prussia's highest military order of bravery, the Pour le Mérite by the Kaiser on 24 October 1914. He also received the highest military honours of the other kingdoms of the German Empire: The Knight's Cross of the Military Order of Max Joseph of Bavaria (making him one of only six non-Bavarians to receive this), the Knight's Cross of Saxony's Military Order of St. Henry and the Knight's Cross of Württemberg's Military Merit Order.

Due to an injury, in January 1915, Weddigen was forced to hand over command to his first officer, Johannes Spieß. After his recovery, he took over command of U-29 on 13 February 1915. Unlike U-9 which operated with petroleum, U-29 had diesel engines.

== Death ==
On 10 March 1915, U-29 set sail from Zeebrugge for its first mission under Weddigen. It reached its area of operations in the Irish Sea and was able to sink four ships with a total of 12,934 GRT over the next few days. On the return march around Scotland, U-29 encountered the Grand Fleet on 18 March 1915, east of the Pentland Firth (between the Scottish mainland and the Orkney Islands). The Grand Fleet was on its way home to its base at Scapa Flow. After a missed shot at the battleship HMS Neptune, the U-boat's periscope was sighted by the battleship HMS Dreadnought. Weddigen was unable to get to depth in time. At around 13:40, Dreadnought rammed U-29, which briefly shot to the surface with its bow. The boat's number was identified. U-29 then sank, with Weddigen and his entire crew killed. It was the only significant combat action of Dreadnought during the First World War. There was initially some disagreement between German and foreign newspapers as to whether a merchant ship or a naval ship sank U-29.

== Legacy ==
Weddigen was celebrated as a war hero in Germany as a result of his military successes, which were perceived as sensational; Herford made him an honorary citizen at the age of 32. Adoration and the creation of legends quickly spread, propagandistically led by the tabloid press loyal to the Kaiser. Beer mugs, medals, wall plates and portrait busts of him were circulated in large numbers. It was soon said that almost every German household had a memento of Weddigen. The cult surrounding the submarine commander during the First World War was later surpassed only by the fighter pilot Manfred von Richthofen, who was shot down on 21 April 1918.

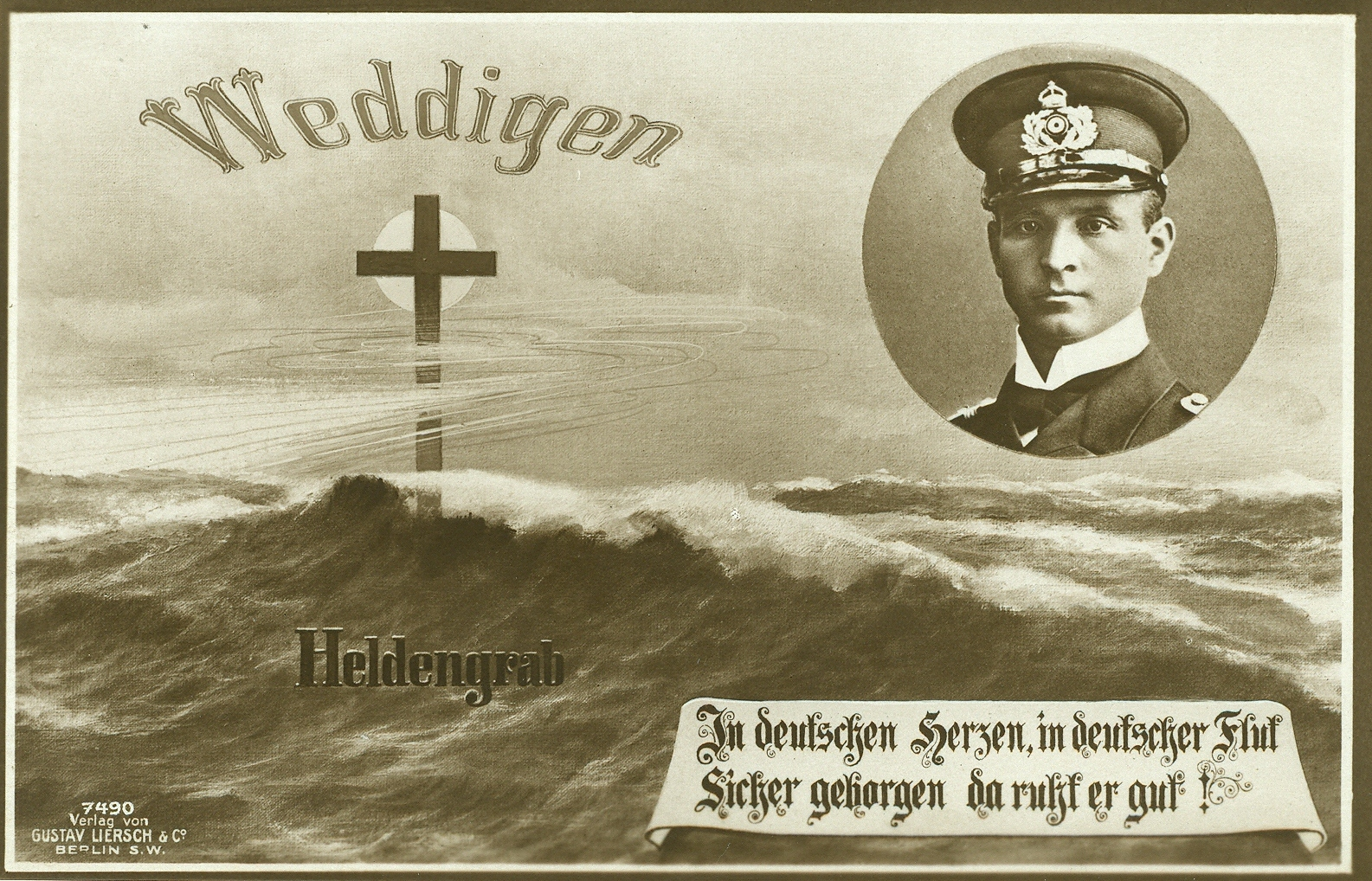
Memorial card of Otto Weddigen

In 1927, Heinz Paul made the feature film U 9 Weddigen with Carl de Vogt in the leading role. Under the National Socialist regime, the memory of the former "war hero" was once again promoted, and several biographies were published.

Even in the Weimar Republic and the National Socialist era, the memory of the naval officer remained alive. Under the National Socialist regime, the memory of the former "war hero" was once again promoted, and several biographies were published. At the University of Kiel, the local Association of German Students Kiel, together with the Academic-Musical Association Albingia and the Academic Gymnastics Association Ditmarsia, formed a comradeship Otto Weddigen of the NSD Student Union after the coordination of the student associations in 1938.

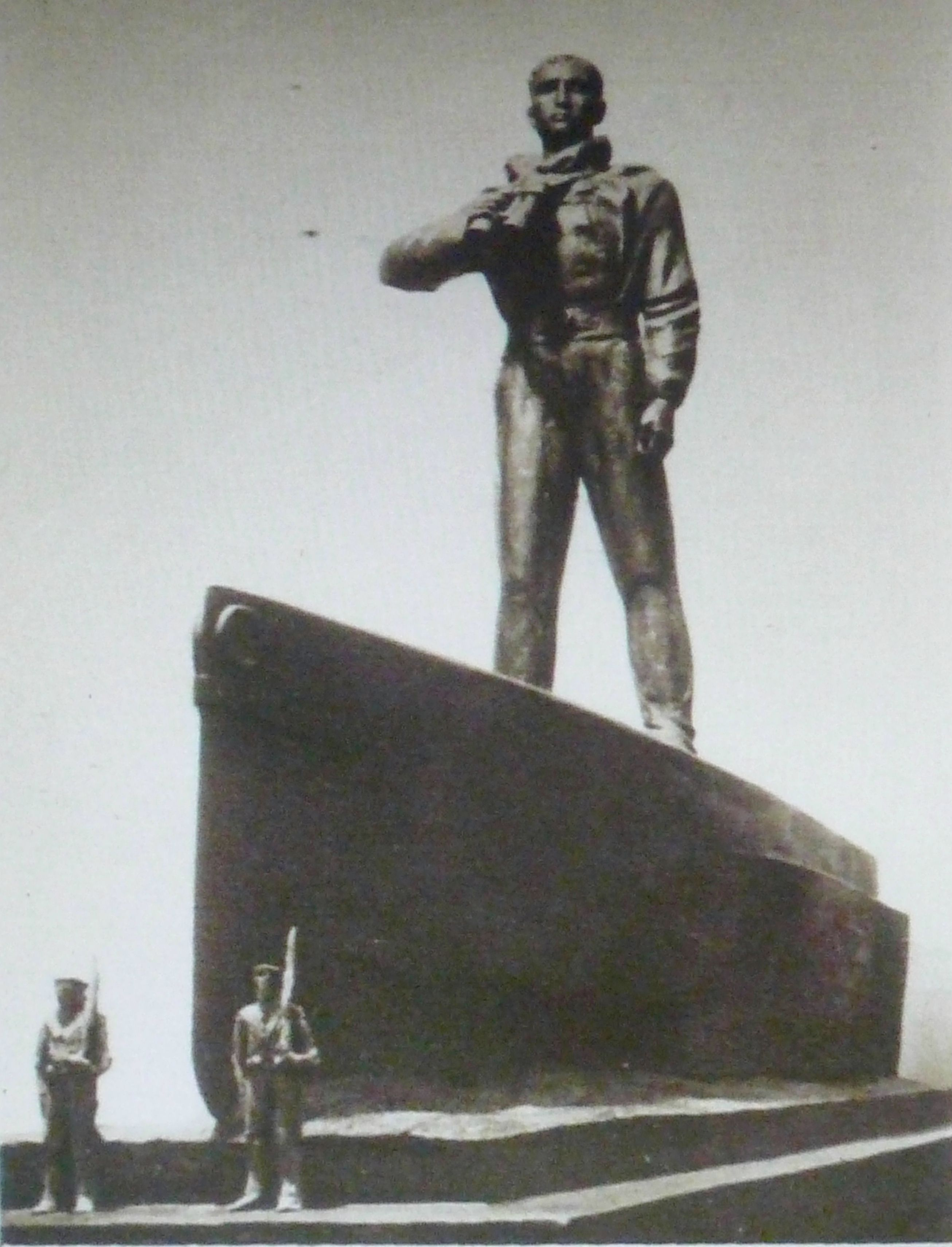
Monument to Otto Weddigen by Hinkeldey, 1937

When the German submarine force was rebuilt, the first newly founded flotilla was named after Weddigen in 1935. Karl Dönitz was the first commander. The boat U-9, like Weddigen's U-9, bore the Iron Cross as a turret badge. Department 6/160 of the Reich Labor Service in Herford was also named after Weddigen. In 1937, the newly built youth hostel in Wilhelmshaven - Rüstringen was given the name Weddigen Youth Hostel. During this time, Leitz built both an underwater camera and a pair of prism binoculars called Weddigen under the brand name Leica. In Herford in 1937, a monument to Weddigen by Ernst Paul Hinkeldey was erected.

After World War II, Weddigen - unlike Richthofen - was largely forgotten outside of naval circles. At the beginning of the 1950s, Pabel-Moewig published several paperback novels about U-9 and Weddigen, including 1953's Mit Weddigen auf große Kriegsfahrt (With Weddigen on a Great War Voyage ). Books about Weddigen as well as devotional items from the hero worship in the German Reich can now only be found in second-hand bookshops and at flea market dealers specializing in militaria. However, with a renewed interest in the events of the First World War, researchers and the arts pages are beginning to take a renewed interest in Weddigen as a person.

In Herford, a memorial plaque is attached to the Frühherrenhaus, Weddigen's birthplace on the corner of Petersilienstrasse and Frühherrenstrasse. The Weddigenufer on the Werre was named after him. An outdoor swimming pool built there in 1935 was used as a military facility for a long time (after the war also by the British Army) bore his name. In the last years before its demolition, the people of Herford called the outdoor pool "Otto" for short. In 1997, a leisure pool was built on the site with the name H2O, a synonym for Herford's 2nd Otto. The Otto Weddigen Marine Association, based in the town, also commemorates him.

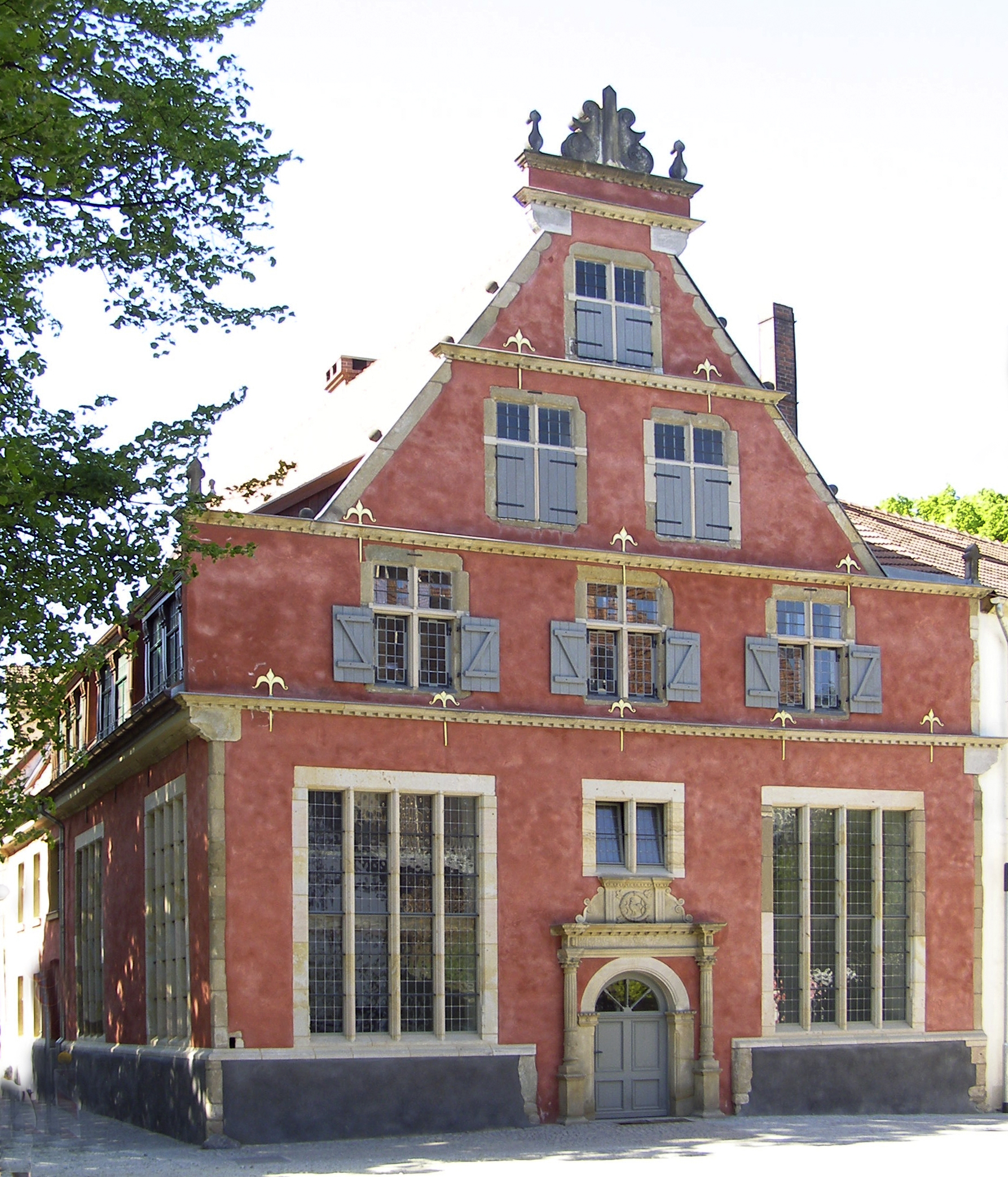
Birthplace of Otto Weddigen

The modern German Navy submarine U-9 also bore the Iron Cross as its coat of arms.

A floating pier in the Kiel naval base is called Weddigenbrücke.

In Berlin, several streets were named after the submarine commander; Weddigenweg in the Steglitz-Zehlendorf district still exists today. In Oberhausen - Sterkrade, Thalstraße was also renamed after him in 1936 and has been called Otto-Weddigen-Straße ever since.

Streets in Augsburg, Aurich, Bielefeld, Freiburg im Breisgau, Gerlingen, Hanover, Landsberg am Lech, Lünen, Munich, Münster, Nordhorn, Nuremberg, Oldenburg, Wuppertal as well as Danzig-Stolzenberg (until 1945), Hamburg (until 1947) and Kiel (also until 1947) are or were named after him. In the small town of Neukirchen-Vluyn on the Lower Rhine, three streets in a mining settlement built in 1919 bear his name (Weddigenplatz, Weddigenallee, Weddigenstraße).

In Düsseldorf-Niederkassel, a rifle company has borne the name Otto Weddigen Company since 1935 – the twentieth anniversary of the U-boat commander's death .

In the private, publicly accessible U-Boat Archive Museum in Cuxhaven, the Otto Weddigen Room is named after him.

== Bibliography ==
- Edwards, Bernard (1996). Dönitz and the Wolf Packs – The U-Boats at War. London, UK: Cassell Military Classics. pp. 11–12. ISBN 0-304-35203-9.
