= SM U-135 =

Coordinates: 49°38.5′N 4°33′W

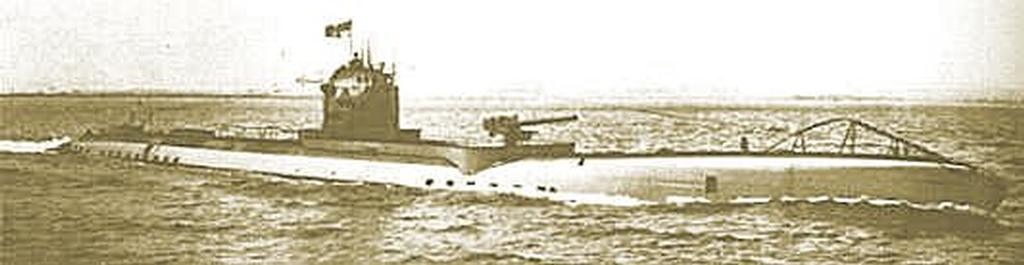
- SM U-135 at sea, 1917

History

German Empire
- Name: U-135
- Ordered: 27 May 1916
- Builder: Kaiserliche Werft Danzig
- Laid down: 4 November 1916
- Launched: 8 September 1917
- Commissioned: 20 June 1918
- Fate: Surrendered, 20 November 1918; Sunk as target 30 June 1921.

General characteristics
- Class & type: Type U 127 submarine
- Displacement: 1,175 t (1,156 long tons) surfaced; 1,534 t (1,510 long tons) submerged
- Length: 83.50 m (273 ft 11 in) o/a; 65.75 m (215 ft 9 in) pressure hull
- Beam: 7.54 m (24 ft 9 in) o/a; 4.85 m (15 ft 11 in) pressure hull
- Height: 9.46 m (31 ft)
- Draught: 4.26 m (14 ft 0 in)
- Installed power: 2 × MAN diesel engines, 3,353 bhp (2,500 kW) total; 2 × diesel generators for surface dash, 888 brake horsepower (662 kW) total; 2 × electric motors, 1,667 shp (1,243 kW) total
- Propulsion: 2 × propeller shafts
- Speed: 17 knots (31 km/h; 20 mph) surfaced; 9.1 knots (16.9 km/h; 10.5 mph) submerged
- Range: 10,000 nmi (19,000 km; 12,000 mi) at 8 knots (15 km/h; 9.2 mph) surfaced; 50 nmi (93 km; 58 mi) at 4.5 knots (8.3 km/h; 5.2 mph) submerged
- Test depth: 75 m (246 ft)
- Complement: 44 men
- Armament: 6 × torpedo tubes (4 bow, 2 stern); 16 × torpedoes; 1 × 15 cm (5.9 in) SK L/45 deck gun with 220 rounds; 1 × 8.8 cm (3.5 in) SK L/30 deck gun

Service record
- Part of: III Flotilla; unknown start – 11 November 1918
- Commanders: Kptlt. Johannes Spieß; 20 June – 11 November 1918
- Operations: None
- Victories: None

SM U-135 (Note: "SM" stands for "Seiner Majestät" (English: His Majesty's) and combined with the U for Unterseeboot would be translated as His Majesty's Submarine.) was a German Type U 127 U-boat of the Imperial German Navy during World War I.

== History ==
Built at the Kaiserliche Werft Danzig, the U-boat was laid down on 4 November 1916, launched on 8 September 1917 and commissioned 20 June 1918.

In November 1918, U-135 was ordered to help put down the German Navy mutiny at Wilhelmshaven. Along with the 4th Torpedo Boat Half-Flotilla, U-135 ended the mutiny aboard two German battleships SMS Thüringen and SMS Helgoland by threatening to torpedo the ships.

U-135 was seen by later submarine designers as an excellent design. She was an inspiration for V-boats USS Cachalot and USS Cuttlefish.

She was surrendered to the Allies at Harwich on 21 November 1918 in accordance with the requirements of the Armistice with Germany. Taken over by the UK, the boat was taken to Devonport, where her engines and various other items of equipment were stripped by a team of 25 students led by Technical Officer Richard Finney [1888-1953] under the auspices of J. F. Driver from the then Loughborough College. This equipment was reassembled initially in a wooden hut in Packe Street, Loughborough, and later in a purpose-built generating station opened in 1937. They were finally taken out of use, and replaced, in 1949. Finally, on 30 June 1921, the hulk was towed out to sea and sunk by gunfire from the submarines HMS/M L21 and L52, in company with U-161.

== Bibliography ==
- Gröner, Erich; Jung, Dieter; Maass, Martin (1991). U-boats and Mine Warfare Vessels. German Warships 1815–1945. Vol. 2. Translated by Thomas, Keith; Magowan, Rachel. London: Conway Maritime Press. ISBN 0-85177-593-4.
