= HMS Calgarian =

Ocean liner and Royal Navy armed merchant cruiser

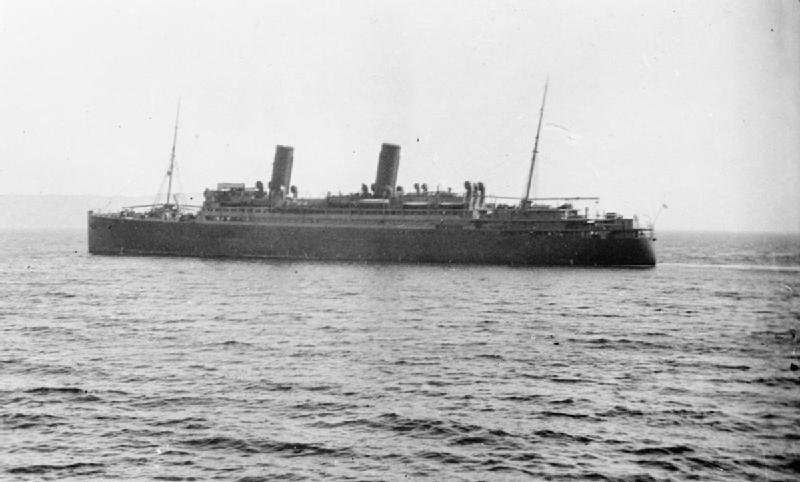
- Calgarian

History

United Kingdom
- Name: Calgarian
- Namesake: demonym for people of Calgary
- Owner: 1914: Allan Line; 1917: Canadian Pacific
- Operator: (United Kingdom) Royal Navy
- Port of registry: (United Kingdom) Glasgow
- Builder: Fairfield, Govan
- Yard number: 487
- Launched: 19 April 1913
- Completed: 1914
- Identification: UK official number 136277; code letters JFDK; call sign MJU; pennant number: 1914: M 54; 1918: MI 58
- Fate: Sunk by torpedo, 1 March 1918

General characteristics
- Type: Ocean liner
- Tonnage: 17,515 GRT, 10,787 NRT
- Length: 568.8 ft (173.4 m)
- Beam: 70.3 ft (21.4 m)
- Draught: 28 ft 6 in (8.7 m)
- Depth: 54 ft (16.5 m) moulded to the bridge deck
- Installed power: 21,000 shp (16,000 kW)
- Propulsion: 4 × screws; 4 × steam turbines
- Speed: 20 knots (37 km/h)
- Armament: 8 × 6 in (150 mm) guns

HMS Calgarian was an Allan Line steam turbine ocean liner, under the name SS Calgarian that was built in 1914 and converted into a Royal Navy armed merchant cruiser. Until 1916 she served with the 9th Cruiser Squadron, patrolling off West Africa and then off the east coast of the United States. She spent the remainder of her career making transatlantic crossings between Canada and Britain.

The Imperial German Navy U-boat U-19 sank her off Rathlin Island, Ireland on 1 March 1918. Three torpedoes hit her, and her sinking killed two officers and 47 ratings.

== Building ==
The Fairfield Shipbuilding and Engineering Company built Calgarian at Govan, Glasgow, for the Allan Line's primary service between Liverpool, England and the Canadian ports of Quebec and Montreal. She had four screws, each driven by a Parsons-type steam turbine. Her external appearance was similar to an earlier ship built for the line, Alsatian built by William Beardmore and Company, but the ships differed in engineering design details.

Calgarian was 590 ft (179.8 m) length on waterline, 570 ft (173.7 m) length between perpendiculars, 70 ft (21.3 m) moulded beam, with a depth moulded to the bridge deck of 54 ft (16.5 m) and a mean designed draught of 28 feet 6 inches (8.7 m). Her tonnages were 17,515 GRT and 10,787 NRT. She had eleven watertight bulkheads and a double bottom to the turn of the bilge.

Passenger capacity was 200 first class, 500 second class and 1,000 third class, with a crew of 500 officers and men. Calgarian had eight decks: A being the boat deck, B the promenade, C the bridge, D the shelter deck, E upper deck, F main deck, G the lower and H the orlop with passenger accommodations on decks A to F. A somewhat novel feature was provision of a "scouting" motor launch capable of 7 knots (13 km/h) with wireless telegraphy and 400 yards (365.8 m) of steel wire tethering it to the ship for use in fog.

The outer port shaft was driven by a high-pressure turbine that exhausted into a medium pressure turbine driving the outer starboard shaft. The two middle shafts, capable of reversal, were each driven by a low-pressure turbine, which in emergencies could each be driven by exhaust from the high-pressure turbine. Each shaft drove a four-bladed bronze propeller for a designed sea speed of 19 knots (35 km/h). Steam was provided by six double-ended and four single-ended forced draft boilers divided between two boiler rooms. On trials in the Firth of Clyde Calgarian attained 21.25 knots (39.36 km/h) and on a double run for contract speed made 20.63 knots (38.21 km/h); one and a half knots (2.8 km/h) above required service speed.

Electric power was provided by three 250 kW steam-driven generating sets, with an 18 kW emergency generator located on the shelter deck above the waterline.

== Commercial service ==
Allan Line registered Calgarian at Glasgow. Her UK official number was 136277 and her code letters were JFDK. She was equipped for wireless telegraphy, operated under contract by the Marconi Company. Her call sign was MJU.

Calgarian made her maiden voyage from Liverpool to Canada on 8 May 1914.

== Armed merchant cruiser ==
On 15 September 1914 the Admiralty requisitioned Calgarian. She was converted into an armed merchant cruiser, armed with eight 6 in (150 mm) guns. By 1 October she had been commissioned. Her pennant number was M54.

Calgarian was assigned to the 9th Cruiser Squadron. From 21 October 1914 until 14 March 1915 she was based at Gibraltar, and patrolled the coast of West Africa. She then crossed the North Atlantic, and from 20 March until 12 June 1915 she was based at Halifax, Nova Scotia on the North America and West Indies Station (with its headquarters and Royal Naval Dockyard at the Imperial fortress colony of Bermuda). She patrolled mostly off New York, apart from one brief patrol early in April off Chesapeake Bay. She then returned via St John's, Newfoundland and Gibraltar carrying Canadian troops to Liverpool, where she arrived on 10 July 1915. She was then overhauled, firstly in Sandon Dock until 11 August 1915 and Canada Dock from then until 21 August.

Calgarian then went via Bermuda to Halifax, where she was based again from 12 September 1915. Again she patrolled mostly off New York, plus three patrols in February, March and August 1916 off Chesapeake Bay. On 22 August she left Halifax again for Liverpool, where she arrived on 27 August.

Calgarian left Liverpool on 5 October 1916 and reached Halifax on 12 October. She left two days later and reached Devonport, England on 20 October, where her logbook records that "HRH disembarked". The log does not state which royal prince this was.

For the remainder of the war, Calgarian made transatlantic voyages, mostly between Liverpool and Halifax. In July 1917 Canadian Pacific bought Allan Line, including Calgarian, but she remained in Royal Navy service.

She was at Portsmouth, England from 24 August 1917 until 18 October, when she resumed transatlantic duties. She was on a voyage from Liverpool to Halifax when the Halifax Explosion took place on 6 December 1917. When she arrived on 8 December she landed a search party, and the next day she embarked "29 refugees". On 10 December a party of one officer and 30 ratings from Calgarian attended Picton, which was still on fire. A party from Calgarian attended Picton again on 11 December. On 21 December Calgarian left Halifax for Liverpool.

Calgarian spent January 1918 in Scotland at Greenock and Glasgow. Her pennant number was changed to MI 58. Her surviving logs end on 31 January at Greenock. She then resumed her transatlantic duties.

== Loss ==
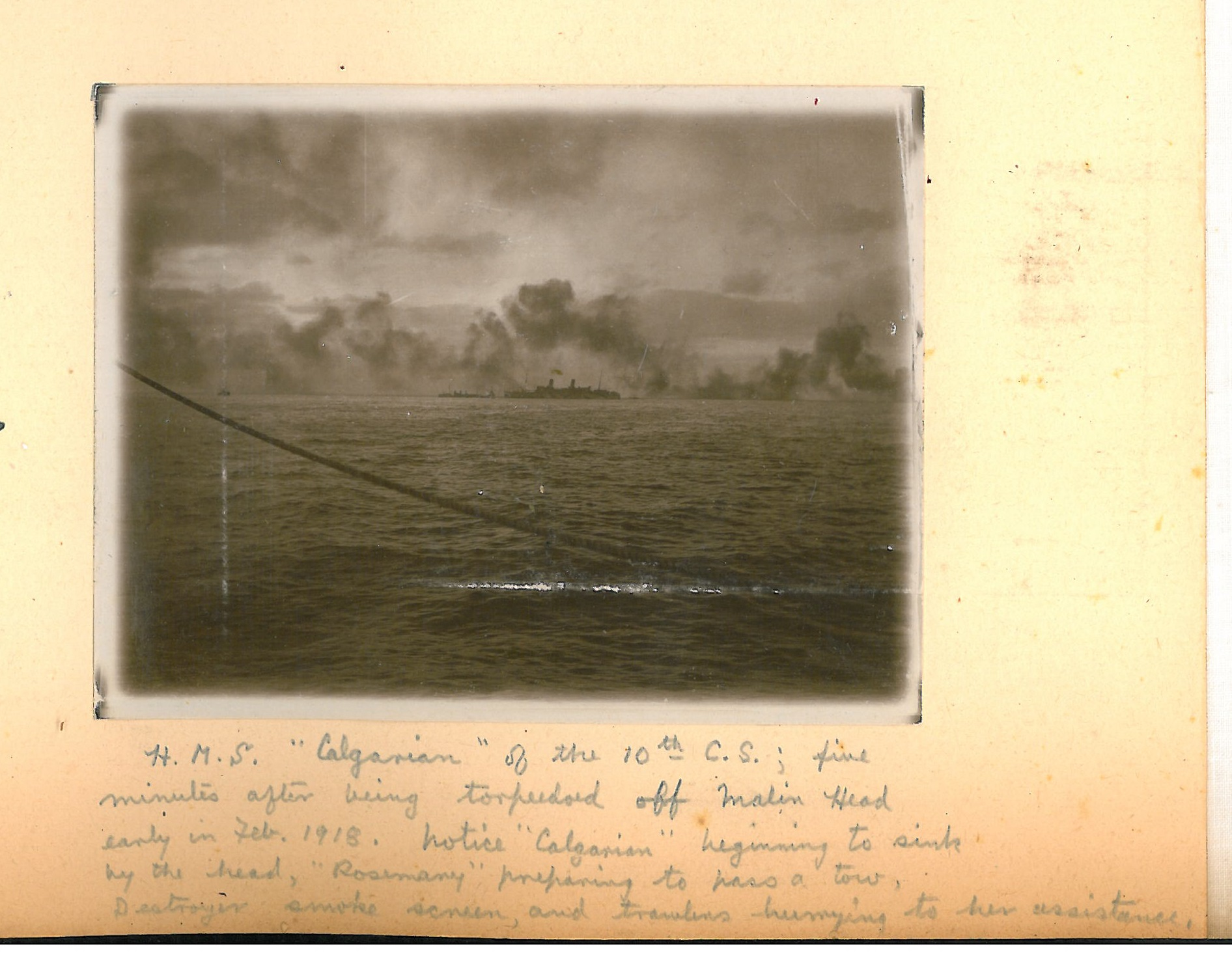
Calgarian sinking, seen from the deck of the sloop HMS Poppy

On 15 February 1918, Calgarian left Halifax with Convoy HS29. On arrival in Home Waters, she left HS29 escorted by the destroyers Beagle and Moresby. They reached the North Channel and were in sight of Convoy OB50 when U-19, commanded by Johannes Spieß, hit her with three torpedoes.

The sloops Anchusa and Rosemary detached from OB50: Anchusa trying to depth charge U-19 and Rosemary taking Calgarian in tow. However, the hawser broke, and Calgarian sank north of Rathlin Island with the loss of 49 men.

== See also ==
- Henry George Kendall

== Bibliography ==
- Lloyd's Register of Shipping. Vol. I–Steamers. London: Lloyd's Register of Shipping. 1914 – via Internet Archive.
- Lloyd's Register of Shipping. Vol. I–Steamers. London: Lloyd's Register of Shipping. 1917 – via Internet Archive.
- The Marconi Press Agency Ltd (1914). The Year Book of Wireless Telegraphy and Telephony. London: The Marconi Press Agency Ltd.
- Mercantile Navy List. London. 1916 – via Crew List Index Project.
- Osborne, Richard; Spong, Harry & Grover, Tom (2007). Armed Merchant Cruisers 1878–1945. Windsor: World Warship Society. ISBN 978-0-9543310-8-5.
- "The New Allan Liner Calgarian". International Marine Engineering. XIX (May 1914). Aldrich Publishing Company: 217–218. 1914.
