= TB Vulcan =

British steam-powered tugboat, 1893–1933

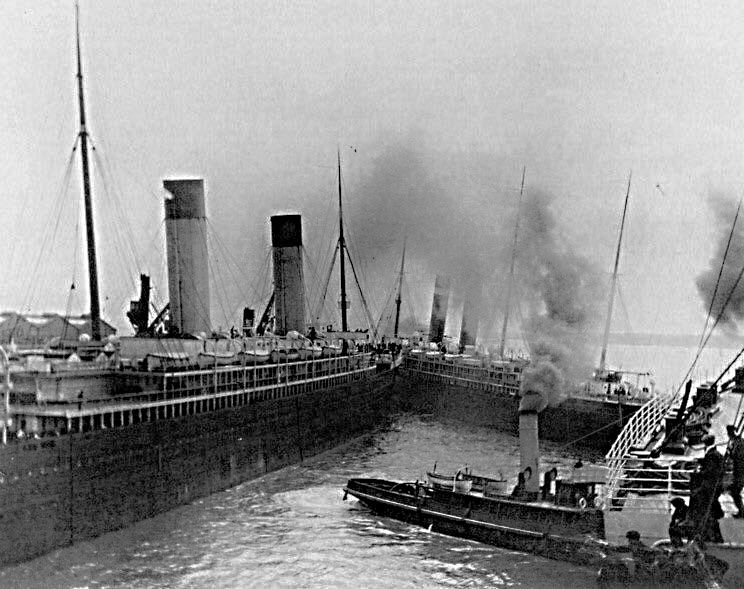
- Vulcan (right, foreground) pulling New York (right, back) away from Titanic on 10 April 1912

History

United Kingdom
- Name: Vulcan
- Namesake: Vulcan
- Owner: Red Funnel
- Builder: Barclay, Curle & Co. Ltd., Glasgow
- Yard number: 383
- Launched: 6 September 1893
- In service: 1893
- Out of service: 1957
- Identification: UK official number 98861
- Fate: Scrapped at Northam, 1957

General characteristics
- Type: Tug-tender
- Tonnage: 288 GRT, 121 NRT
- Length: 120.0 ft (36.6 m)
- Beam: 25.1 ft (7.7 m)
- Depth: 11.8 ft (3.6 m)
- Decks: 1
- Installed power: 2 × compound steam engines by the shipbuilder; 1,200 ihp
- Propulsion: Twin screws
- Speed: 12 kn (14 mph; 22 km/h)

TB Vulcan was a British steam-powered tugboat operated by the Southampton Isle of Wight and South of England Royal Mail Steam Packet Company Limited. Launched in 1893, she assisted in moving ocean liners and other large vessels at the Port of Southampton.

Vulcan is notable for averting a collision between RMS Titanic and SS New York during the former's maiden voyage on 10 April 1912. Under the command of Captain Charles Gale the vessel intervened when the suction created by Titanic's draft snapped New York's mooring lines, causing the smaller liner to drift towards Titanic. Vulcan secured a tow line and pulled the New York clear. The two ships avoided a collision by a distance of about 4 feet (1.2 m). In doing so, she prevented a crash that would have likely ended the Titanic's voyage before it had left English waters.

Vulcan was a passenger-tugboat of the Port of Southampton for over six decades, assisting many of the world's largest ships, including Olympic-class liners and various Cunard vessels, before being scrapped in 1957.

== Construction and early career ==
Vulcan was built in 1893 by Barclay, Curle & Co. Ltd in Glasgow, Scotland as yard number 383 and launched on 4 March 1893. She was the third of four similar tug-tenders ordered by the Southampton Isle of Wight and South of England Royal Mail Steam Packet Company Limited (Red Funnel) in the early 1890s to supersede their older and smaller tugs. They were more powerful, serving increasingly large ocean liners, and with passenger accommodation to attend continental vessels making calls in Cowes Roads as well as to provide local excursions in the season. Vulcan was licensed to carry 272 passengers.

The tug was designed with a steel hull and twin screws and was powered by two sets of 3-cylinder triple expansion steam engines, also manufactured by Barclay, Curle & Co. These engines were capable of producing 1,200 ihp. She was delivered to Southampton and became a workhorse for the Red Funnel fleet.

On 20 September 1911 Vulcan was one of the tugs that assisted the RMS Olympic after the famous collision with the cruiser HMS Hawke in the Solent.

== Titanic incident ==
On 10 April 1912, White Star Line's RMS Titanic was leaving Southampton docks, and the massive displacement of the new liner created a powerful suction effect. As Titanic passed the moored liners SS New York and RMS Oceanic, the suction was so intense that the six steel mooring lines of New York snapped. Her stern began to drift into the path of Titanic.

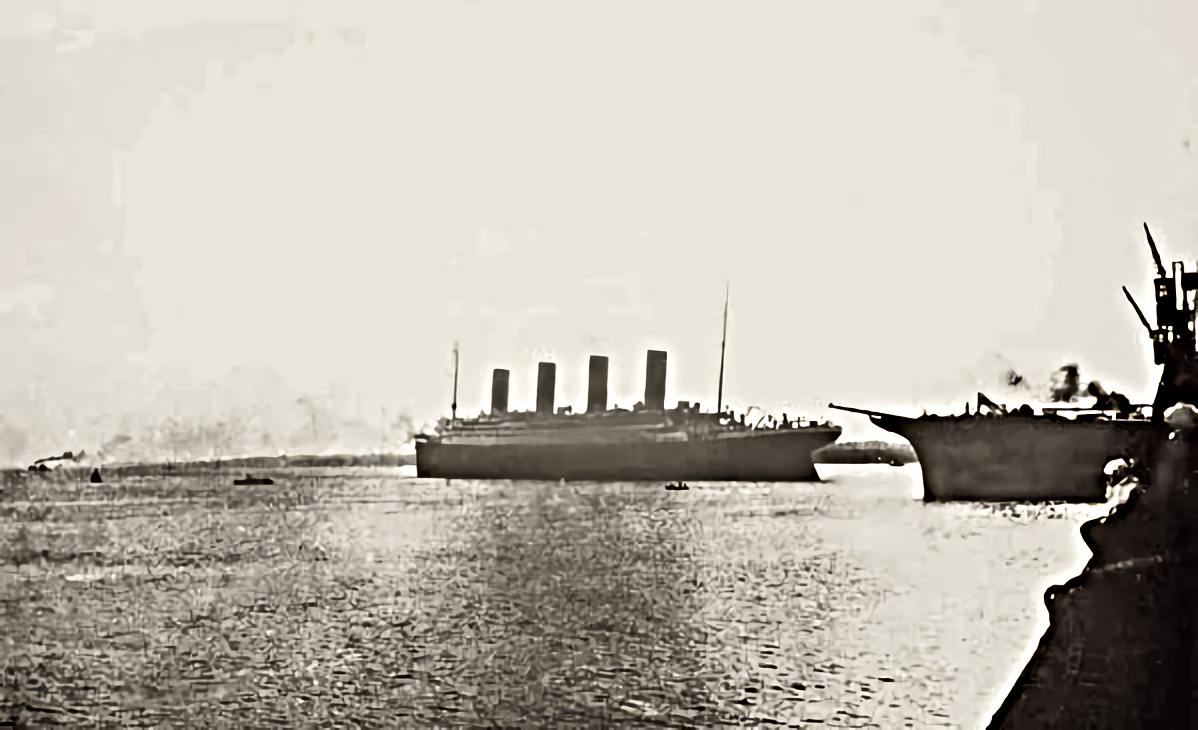
Titanic departing Southampton after the incident. Vulcan is alongside her aft-port quarter.

Vulcan was stationed nearby to assist with the departure, and her captain, Charles Gale, manoeuvred the tug into position to help. The vessel managed to get a tow line onto New York but the strain was so immense that the line snapped almost instantly. Captain Gale subsequently threw a second line, which held. Vulcan pulled the New York back to the quay. At the same time Titanic's Captain Edward Smith ordered the engines full astern, and the resulting wash from Titanic's propellers pushed the New York away from the hull.

The two ships came within 4 feet (1.2 m) of each other. The incident delayed Titanic's departure by about an hour, and many passengers saw this as a potential bad omen for the ship's fate only four days later.
