= Violet Jessop =

Argentine-born British ocean liner stewardess (1887–1971)

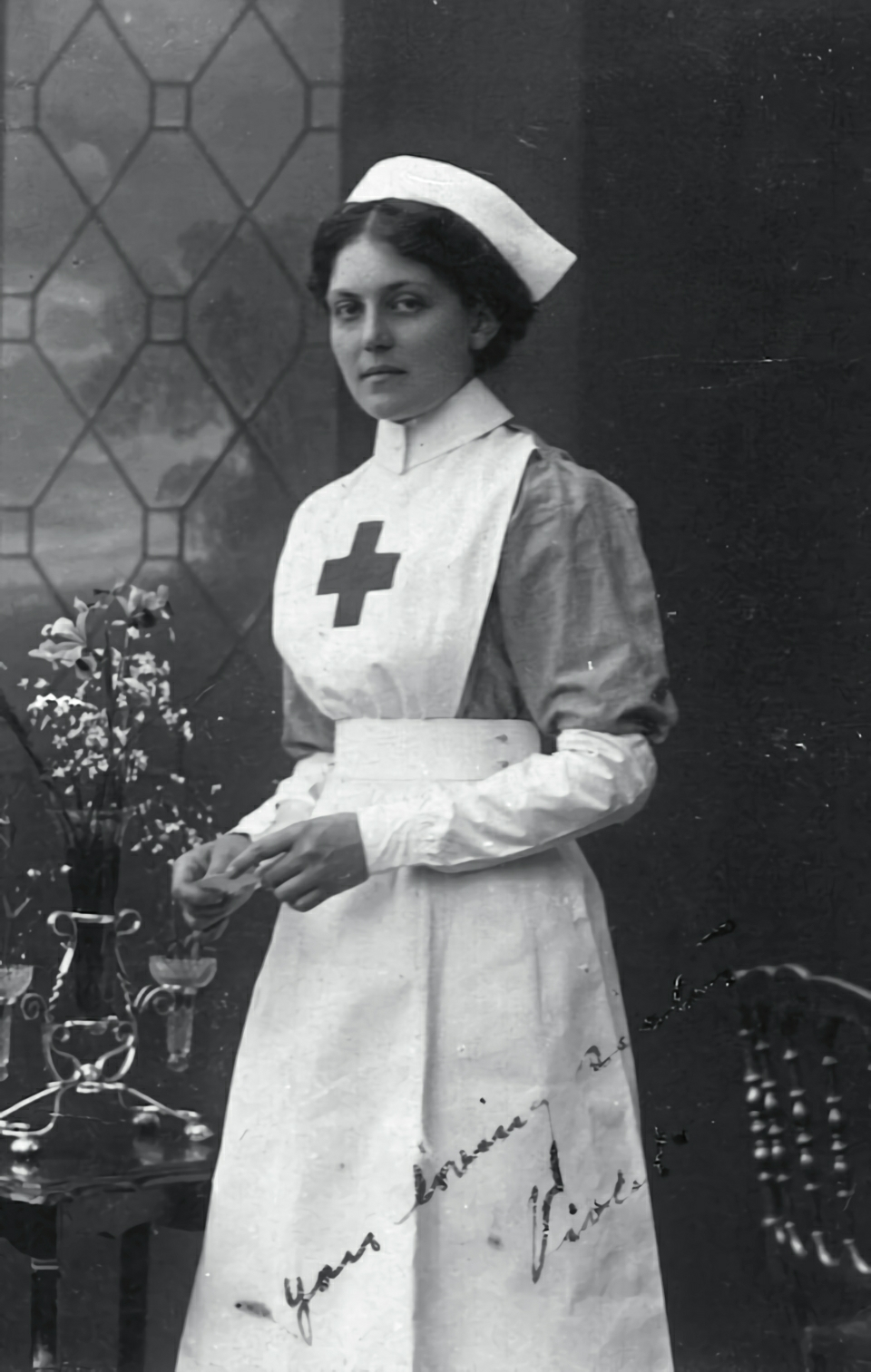
- Jessop in her Voluntary Aid Detachment uniform while assigned to HMHS Britannic.
- Born: 2 October 1887; Bahía Blanca, Argentina
- Died: 5 May 1971 (aged 83); Great Ashfield, Suffolk, England
- Occupations: Ocean liner stewardess, nurse
- Spouse: John J. Lewis (m. 1923; div. 1924)

Violet Constance Jessop (2 October 1887 – 5 May 1971) also known as Miss Unsinkable, was an Argentine-born Irish ocean liner stewardess and Voluntary Aid Detachment nurse during World War I. She is notable for having survived the sinking of both RMS Titanic in 1912 and sister ship HMHS Britannic in 1916, as well as having been aboard the eldest of the three ships of that class, RMS Olympic, when it collided with the British warship HMS Hawke in 1911.

== Early life ==
Born in the Pampas on 2 October 1887, near Bahía Blanca, Argentina, Violet Constance Jessop was the eldest daughter of Irish immigrants Katherine (née Kelly) and William Jessop, a sheep farmer. She was the first of nine children, six of whom survived. Jessop spent much of her childhood caring for her younger siblings. She became very ill as a child with what is presumed to have been tuberculosis. She survived, although the doctors had predicted that her illness would be fatal. When Jessop was 16 years old, her father died of complications from surgery and her family moved to England, where she attended a convent school and cared for her youngest sister while her mother was at sea working as a stewardess. When her mother became ill, Jessop left school and, following in her mother's footsteps, applied to be a stewardess. Jessop had to dress down to make herself less attractive to be hired. At age 21, her first stewardess position was with Royal Mail Line aboard Orinoco in 1908.

== RMS Olympic ==
In 1911, Jessop began working as a stewardess for the White Star liner RMS Olympic. Olympic was a luxury ship that was the largest civilian liner at that time. Jessop was aboard on 20 September 1911, when Olympic left from Southampton and collided with the British warship HMS Hawke. There were no fatalities and, despite damage, the ship returned to port unaided. Jessop did not discuss this collision in her memoirs. She continued to work on Olympic until April 1912, when she was transferred to its sister ship Titanic.

== RMS Titanic ==
Jessop boarded Titanic as a stewardess on 10 April 1912, at age 24. Four days later, on 14 April, it struck an iceberg in the North Atlantic and sank about two hours and forty minutes after the collision. Jessop described in her memoirs how she was ordered up on deck to serve as an example of how to behave for the non-English speakers who could not follow the instructions given to them. She watched as the crew loaded the lifeboats. She was later ordered into lifeboat 16, and as the boat was being lowered, Titanic's sixth officer, James Paul Moody, gave her a baby to look after. The next morning, Jessop and the rest of the survivors were rescued by the RMS Carpathia and taken to New York City on 18 April. According to Jessop, while aboard Carpathia, a woman, presumably the baby's mother, grabbed the baby she was holding and ran off crying, without saying a word. After arriving in New York City, she later returned to Southampton.

== HMHS Britannic ==
In the First World War, Jessop became a nurse for the Voluntary Aid Detachment. On the morning of 21 November 1916 she was aboard the hospital ship Britannic, the younger sister ship of Olympic and Titanic, when it sank in the Aegean Sea after detonating a German naval mine. Britannic sank within 55 minutes, killing 30 of the 1,066 people aboard.

While Britannic was sinking, Jessop and other passengers were nearly killed by the ship's propellers that were shredding lifeboats that collided with them. Jessop had to jump out of her lifeboat, resulting in a traumatic head injury which she survived. In her memoirs, she described the scene she witnessed as Britannic went under: "... dipped her head a little, then a little lower and still lower. All the deck machinery fell into the sea like a child's toys. Then she took a fearful plunge, her stern rearing hundreds of feet into the air until with a final roar, she disappeared into the depths." Two other Titanic survivors, Arthur Priest and Archie Jewell, were also aboard and both survived.

== Later life ==
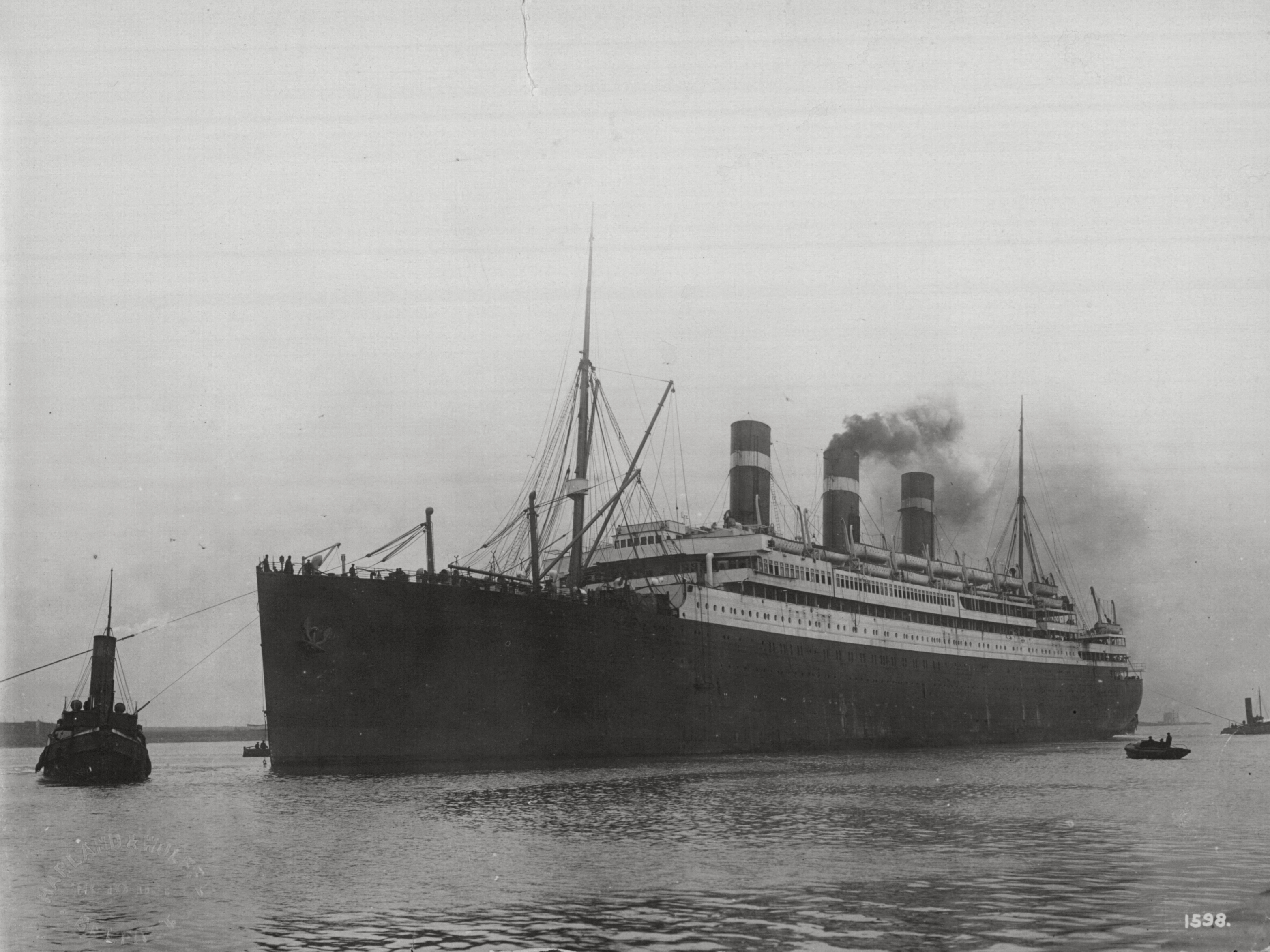
Belgenland, on which Jessop went twice around the World

Jessop returned to work for White Star Line in 1920, before joining Red Star Line and then Royal Mail Line again. In her time with Red Star, Jessop went on two cruises around the World on the company's flagship, Belgenland. When Jessop was 36, she married John James Lewis, a fellow White Star Line steward. Lewis had served aboard Olympic and Majestic. They divorced around a year later. In 1950, she retired to Great Ashfield, Suffolk.

Years after her retirement, Jessop claimed to have received a telephone call, on a stormy night, from a woman who asked Jessop if she had saved a baby on the night that Titanic sank. "Yes," Jessop replied. The voice then said "I was that baby," laughed, and hung up. Her friend and biographer John Maxtone-Graham said it was most likely some children in the village playing a joke on her. She replied, "No, John, I had never told that story to anyone before I told you now." Records indicate that the only baby on lifeboat 16 was As'ad Tannūs, also known as Assad Thomas, and later reunited with his mother on Carpathia. However, Tannūs died on 12 June 1931, so he could not have phoned Jessop two decades later.

In 1971, aged 83, Jessop died of congestive heart failure.

== In media ==
In the 1958 film A Night To Remember, a scene depicts naval architect Thomas Andrews (played by Michael Goodliffe) instructing a stewardess to be seen wearing her life jacket as an example to the other passengers. Several scenes from this film inspired later depictions of the sinking; in James Cameron's later 1997 blockbuster Titanic, a similar encounter takes place involving Andrews and a stewardess named Lucy, who is also told to wear her life jacket in order to convince the passengers to do the same.

In the 1979 television movie S.O.S. Titanic, Jessop is depicted as an elderly stewardess played by Madge Ryan. (Jessop was 24 at the time she served on the Titanic; Ryan was 60 at the time the movie was made.)

In 2006, "Shadow Divers" John Chatterton and Richie Kohler led an expedition to dive HMHS Britannic. The dive team needed to accomplish a number of tasks including reviewing the expansion joints. The team was looking for evidence that would change the thinking on RMS Titanic's sinking. During the expedition, Rosemary E. Lunn played the role of Violet Jessop, re-enacting her jumping into the water, from her lifeboat which was being drawn into Britannic's still turning propellers.

The character of Jessop is featured in the Chris Burgess stage play Iceberg – Right Ahead!, staged for the first time Upstairs at the Gatehouse in Highgate, March 2012, to commemorate the centenary of the sinking of Titanic. Jessop's role was played by Amy-Joyce Hastings.

Jessop was played by Vicky Allen in Titanic Sinks Tonight , a 2025 BBC 4-part drama-documentary series.

== See also ==
- Arthur Priest, a stoker who also survived the sinking of Titanic and Britannic and was on Olympic during the collision with HMS Hawke, as well as other shipwrecks
- Archie Jewell, lookout and sailor who survived Titanic and Britannic but died in the sinking of SS Donegal.
- Wenman Wykeham-Musgrave, a British sailor who survived three consecutive sinkings in the action of 22 September 1914.
- Helen Repa, nurse who saved lives during the SS Eastland Disaster.
- Mary McCann, nurse from the burning of the PS General Slocum.
