= The Gardens, Great Ashfield =

Site of Special Scientific Interest in Suffolk, England

Coordinates: 52.274°N 0.927°E

- Site of Special Scientific Interest
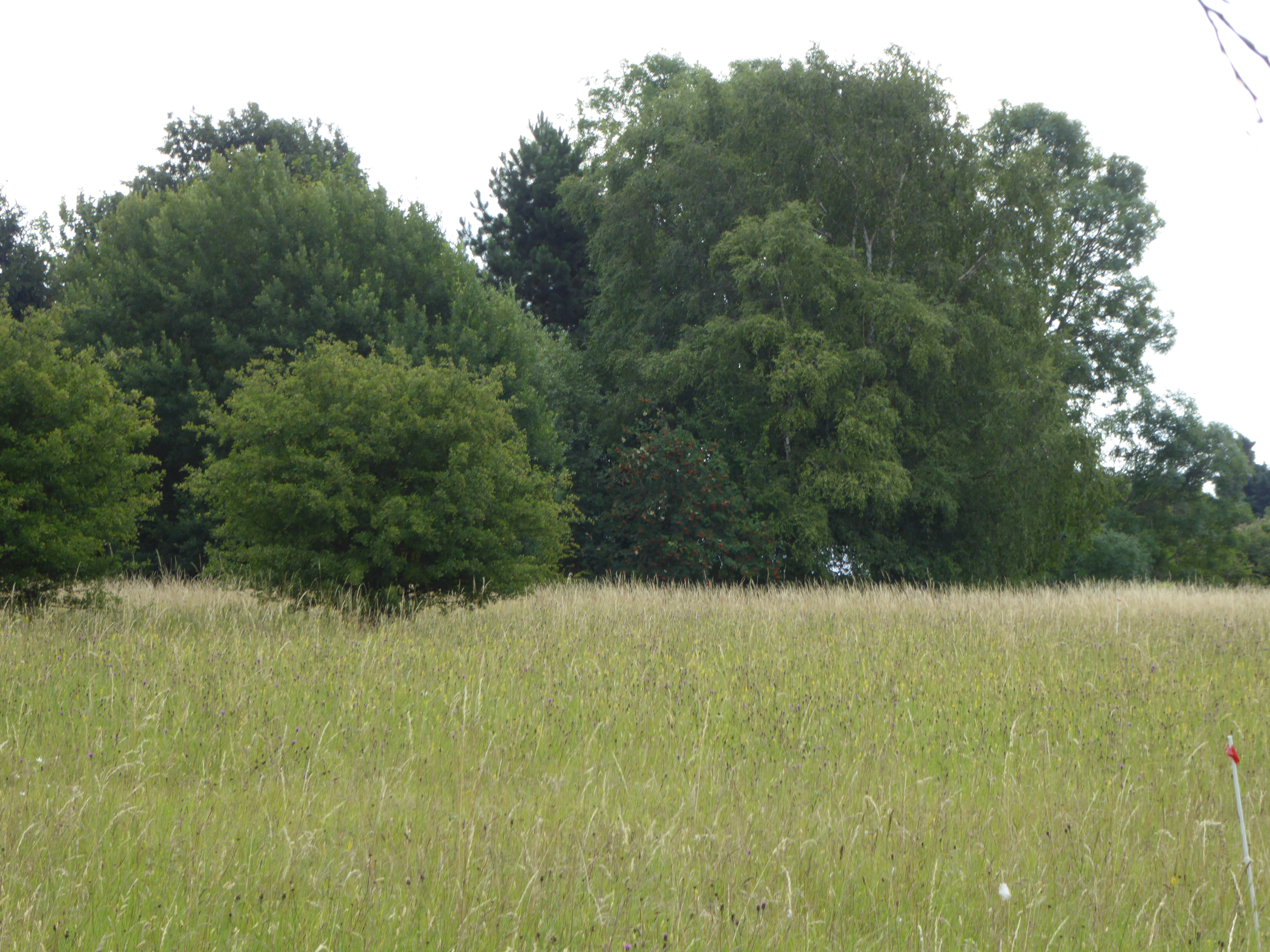
- Location of The Gardens, Great Ashfield.
- Area of search: Suffolk
- Grid reference: TL 998 680
- Interest: Biological
- Area: 3.8 hectares
- Notification date: 1987
- Location map: Magic Map

The Gardens, Great Ashfield is a 3.8-hectare (9.4-acre) biological Site of Special Scientific Interest north of Great Ashfield in Suffolk.

These ancient meadows are traditionally managed by grazing and cutting for hay. They have a rich variety of flora, such as green-winged orchid, bee orchid, common twayblade, pepper saxifrage, adder's tongue fern and ox-eye daisy.

The site is private land with no public access.
