= Olympic–Hawke collision =

1911 maritime incident

RMS Olympic and HMS Hawke collision
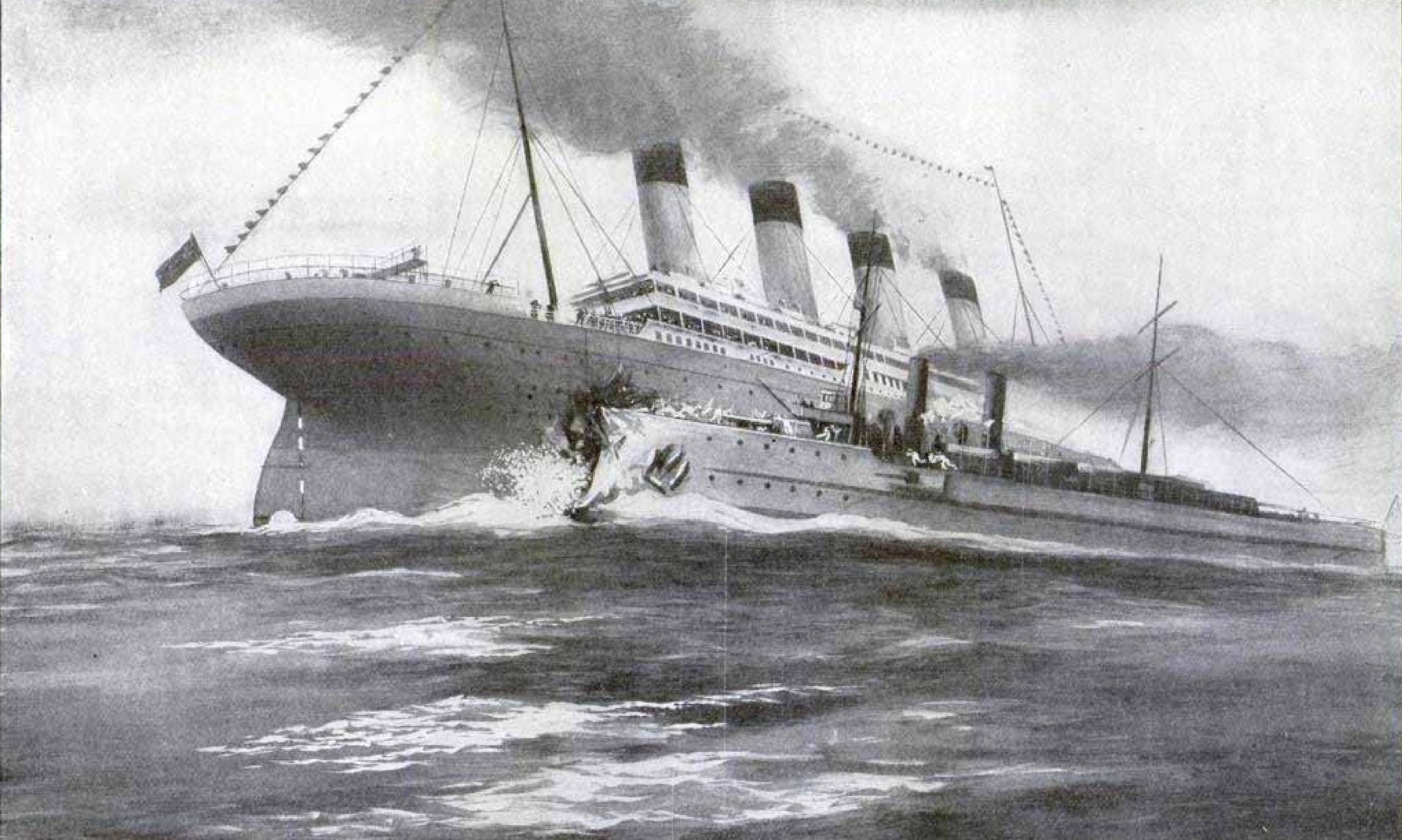
- A sketch of Hawke ramming into Olympic.
- Date: 20 September 1911; 115 years ago
- Location: The Solent, Isle of Wight; 50°46′39.6″N 1°16′41.5″W
- Type: Maritime incident
- Participants: Crews of RMS Olympic and HMS Hawke
- Outcome: Both ships remained afloat but heavily damaged.; White Star Line held liable for damage to HMS Hawke.; Repairs to RMS Olympic delayed maiden voyage of the RMS Titanic.

On 20 September 1911, while travelling down the Solent, the Royal Navy cruiser HMS Hawke collided with the White Star ocean liner RMS Olympic.

Olympic was, at the time, the world's largest ocean liner and was undergoing what would have been her fifth voyage. In the course of the collision, Hawke lost her inverted bow, which was replaced by a straight bow. The subsequent trial pronounced Hawke to be free from any blame. During the trial, a theory was advanced that the large amount of water displaced by Olympic had generated a suction that had drawn Hawke off course, causing the Olympic's voyage to be delayed. The White Star Line also lost on appeal.

The collision had the consequence of delaying the completion and maiden voyage of Olympic's sister ship, RMS Titanic. Due to the financial blow suffered from collision, the White Star Line was eager to get Olympic back into service and diverted workers from the still-under-construction Titanic to help with the repairs.

== Collision ==
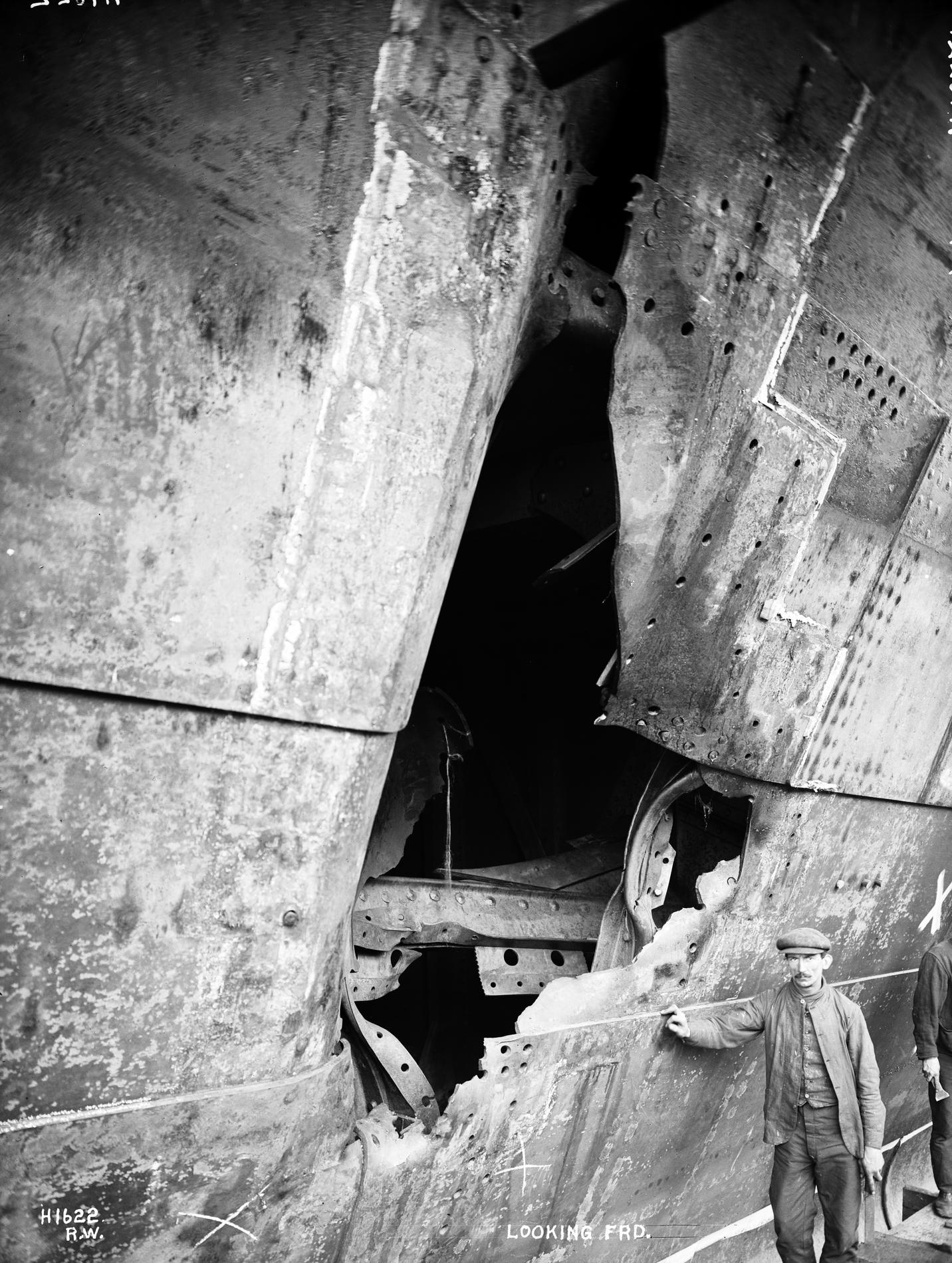
Damage to the Olympic under the waterline.

The collision took place as Olympic and Hawke were running parallel to each other through the Solent. As Olympic turned to starboard, the wide radius of her turn took the commander of Hawke, William Frederick Blunt, by surprise, and he was unable to take sufficient avoiding action. Hawke's bow, which had been designed to sink ships by ramming them, collided with Olympic's starboard side near the stern, tearing two large holes in Olympic's hull, above and below the waterline, resulting in the flooding of two of her watertight compartments and a twisted propeller shaft. Olympic settled slightly by the stern, but in spite of the damage was able to return to Southampton under her own power; no one was killed or seriously injured. HMS Hawke suffered severe damage to her bow but also managed to stay afloat.

Captain Edward Smith was in command of Olympic at the time of the incident; he would die seven months later as captain of RMS Titanic. Two crew members, stewardess Violet Jessop and stoker Arthur Priest, survived not only the collision with Hawke but also the later sinking of Titanic and the 1916 sinking of Britannic, the third ship of the class. First Officer William Murdoch, Chief Officer Henry Wilde, and Chief Purser Hugh McElroy, all of whom died in the Titanic sinking, were also aboard the ship. Also on board, as passengers, were businessman William Payne Whitney and politician William Waldorf Astor.

== Inquiries ==
At the subsequent inquiry the Royal Navy blamed Olympic for the incident, alleging that her large displacement generated a suction that pulled Hawke into her side. Amongst those testifying were Captain Smith, Chief Officer Wilde, and First Officer Murdoch of the Olympic.

The Hawke incident was a financial disaster for Olympic's operator. A legal argument ensued which decided that the blame for the incident lay with Olympic and, although the ship was technically under the control of the harbour pilot, George Bowyer, the White Star Line was faced with large legal bills and the cost of repairing the ship, and keeping her out of revenue service made matters worse. However, the fact that Olympic endured such a serious collision and stayed afloat appeared to vindicate the design of the Olympic-class liners, and reinforced their "unsinkable" reputation.

== Repairs ==
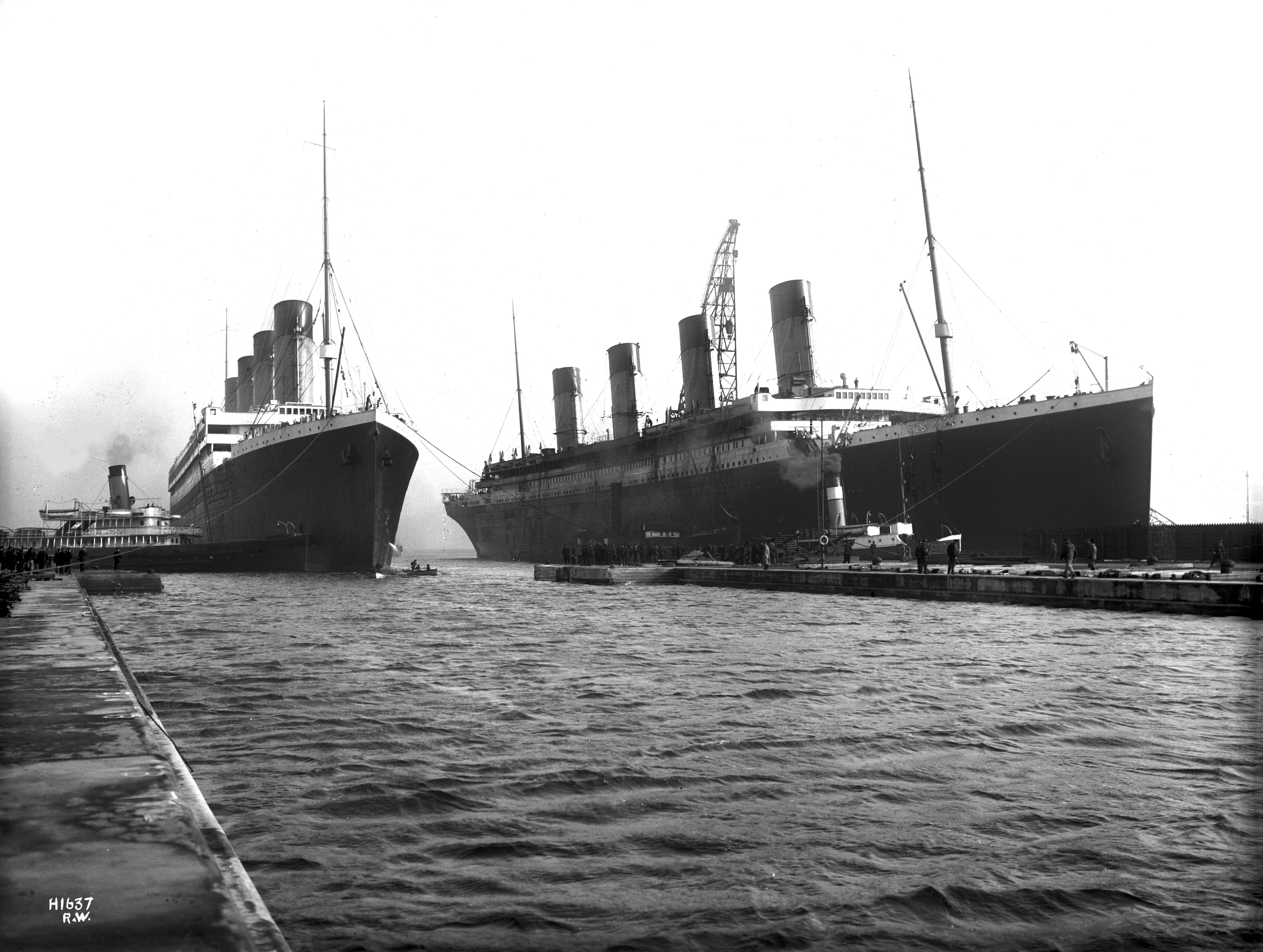
Olympic (left) being manoeuvred into dry dock in Belfast for repairs on the morning of 2 March 1912 after throwing a propeller blade. Titanic (right) is moored at the fitting-out wharf. This was the last time the two sisters ships were photographed together.

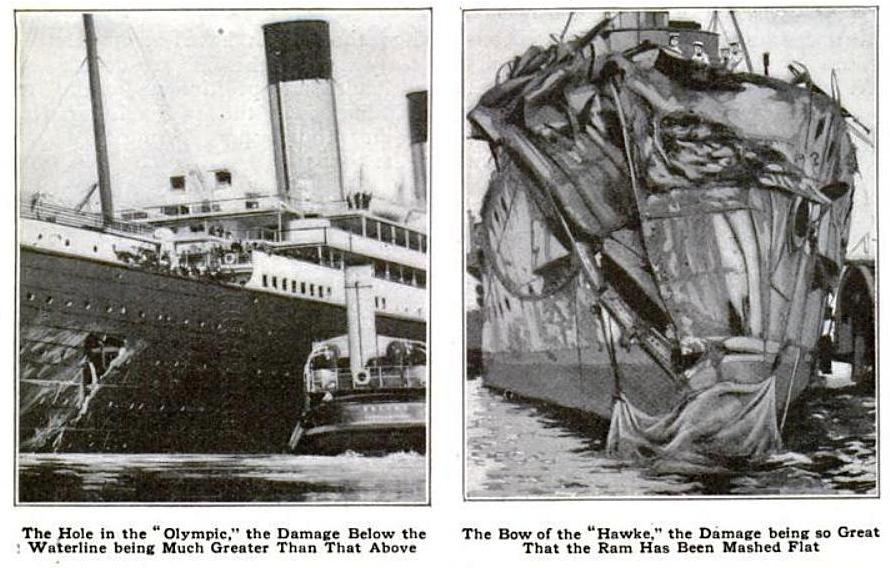
Images documenting the damage to Olympic (left) and Hawke (right) following their collision

It took two weeks for the damage to Olympic to be patched up sufficiently to allow her to return to Belfast for permanent repairs, which took just over six weeks to complete. To expedite repairs, Harland & Wolff was obliged to replace Olympic's damaged propeller shaft with one from Titanic, delaying the latter's completion. By 20 November 1911 Olympic was back in service.

However, on 24 February 1912, the Olympic suffered another setback when she lost a propeller blade on an eastbound voyage from New York, and once again returned to her builder for repairs. To return her to service as soon as possible, Harland & Wolff again had to pull resources from Titanic, delaying her maiden voyage by three weeks, from 20 March to 10 April 1912.

== See also ==
- Sinking of the Titanic
