= George Bowyer (pilot) =

British harbour pilot

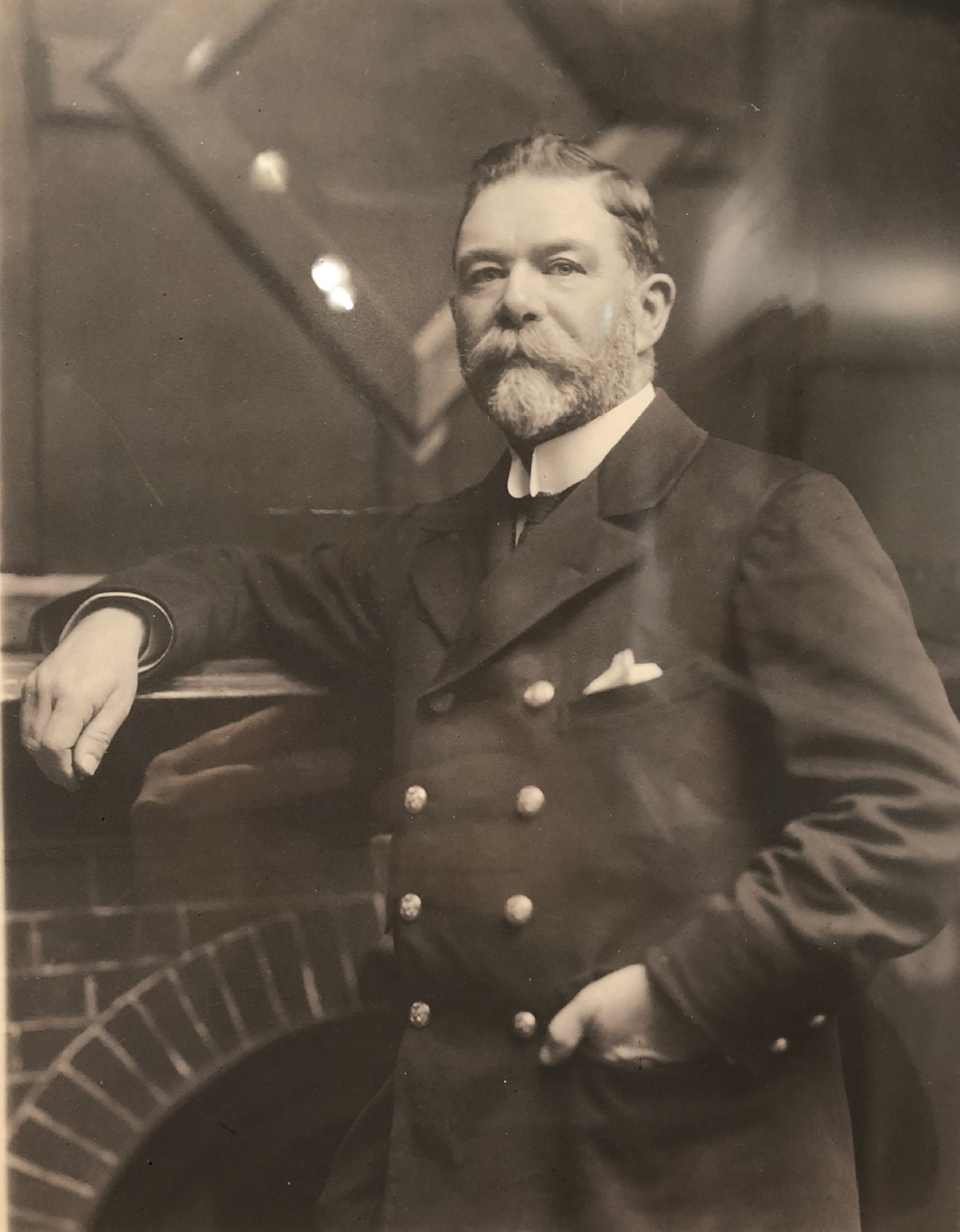
- Bowyer, c. 1910s
- Born: 16 October 1859; Southampton, Hampshire, England
- Died: 21 June 1945 (aged 85); Milford on Sea, Hampshire, England
- Occupation: Trinity House pilot
- Known for: Pilot at the time of RMS Olympic's collision with HMS Hawke
- Spouse: Emma Hill (m. 1860; died 1944)
- Children: 9

George William Bowyer (16 October 1859 – 21 June 1945) was a British maritime pilot for Trinity House. He is best known for being the long-time pilot who was tasked with taking ships from Southampton through the Solent, most notably doing so with the RMS Titanic during her ill-fated maiden voyage.

Bowyer was in charge of the RMS Olympic when it collided with HMS Hawke in 1911 and was found to be at fault for the accident in subsequent inquiries. However, despite this, the White Star Line continued to use his services until his retirement in 1929.

== Early life ==
Bowyer was born in The Cottage, West Gate in Southampton, Hampshire, one of nine children born to Richard Bowyer and Sarah (née Cue). His cousin Henry Bowyer went on to become Alderman and Mayor of Southampton and joined the Royal Naval Reserve. The Bowyer family were long associated with the port of Southampton and many family members took jobs in the maritime service.

== Career ==
Bowyer's father and uncle were both Southampton pilots and he followed the same family career, starting as an apprentice pilot in 1871. In 1890, he was appointed as pilot for the Union Line with whom he piloted ships such as the Roman, German, Arab, Nubian, Tartar, Mexican, Moor, and Scot. During the Second Boer War, he piloted the majority of troop transport ships, including the RMS Majestic and RMS Umbria.

In 1903, Bowyer was selected as pilot for the International Mercantile Marine Company (IMM), including the first of the American Line vessels on the Southampton-New York route. In 1907, Trinity House introduced new regulations which restricted pilots to serve for only two shipping lines. Subsequently, Bowyer worked exclusively the American Line and the White Star Line for the remainder of his career.

=== St. Paul–Gladiator collision ===
During a late snowstorm off the Isle of Wight on 25 April 1908, the Royal Navy cruiser HMS Gladiator was heading into port when she struck the outbound SS Saint Paul. Visibility was down to 800 yd (730 m), but the strong tides and gale force winds required both ships to maintain high speeds to maintain steerage.

Bowyer was, at the time, in charge of the ship whose job as its pilot. Saint Paul's lookouts on spotted the Gladiator off Hurst Point. In an attempt to prevent a collision, Bowyer ordered all engines stopped to reduce the closing speed, as well as attempting to pass to the port side of the cruiser, as was standard practice. However, Captain William Lumsden of the Gladiator chose to turn the opposite way and Saint Paul struck Gladiator just aft of her engine room.

The collision resulted in the naval cruiser capsizing and the deaths of 28 sailors.

=== Olympic–Hawke collision ===
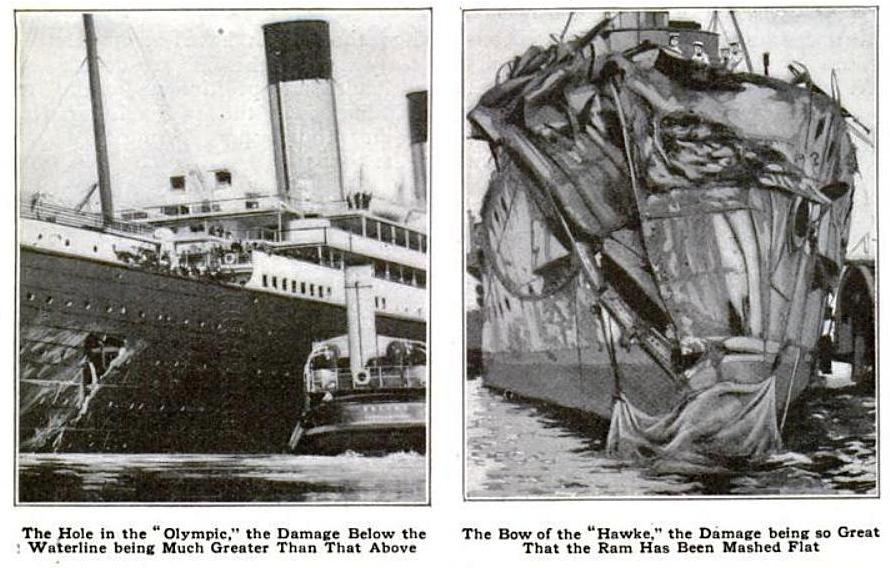
Images documenting the damage to RMS Olympic (left) and HMS Hawke (right) following their collision

On 20 September 1911, Bowyer was in charge of the brand new White Star liner RMS Olympic which had begun her fifth voyage. While travelling down the Solent, the ship found itself sailing parallel to the Royal Navy cruiser HMS Hawke.

The Hawke, under the command of William Frederick Blunk, took course to overtake on Olympic's starboard side. To his surprise, however, the cruiser began turning and drawing towards the liner, probably by a combination of water displacement and propeller suction. Hawke's bow, which had been designed to sink ships by ramming them, collided with Olympic's starboard side near the stern, tearing two large holes in Olympic's hull, above and below the waterline, resulting in the flooding of two of her watertight compartments and a twisted propeller shaft. Olympic settled slightly by the stern, while Hawke suffered severe damage to her bow but also managed to stay afloat.

According to later testimony, seconds before the Hawke struck Olympic, Captain Edward Smith and Bowyer had a short exchange:

Captain Smith: "I do not believe he will go under our stern, Bowyer."
Pilot Bowyer: "If she is going to strike let me know in time to put our helm hard-aport."

Smith did not reply immediately, and a few seconds later Bowyer asked the captain, "Is she going to strike us or not, sir?" to which Smith replied, "Yes she is going to strike us in the stern." Bowyer immediately gave the order to go hard to port to Quartermaster Albert Haines who only just managed to turn the helm hard over with the Hawke struck.

Bowyer was up before the court and questioned over his seamanship of navigating Olympic in the Solent. As Olympic had been under pilotage at the time, Bowyer was found to be at fault for the incident. However, the White Star Line felt they had been in the right and the Hawke was to blame. Subsequently, they never turned against Bowyer who would continue serving them until his retirement.

=== RMS Titanic and near collision with SS New York ===
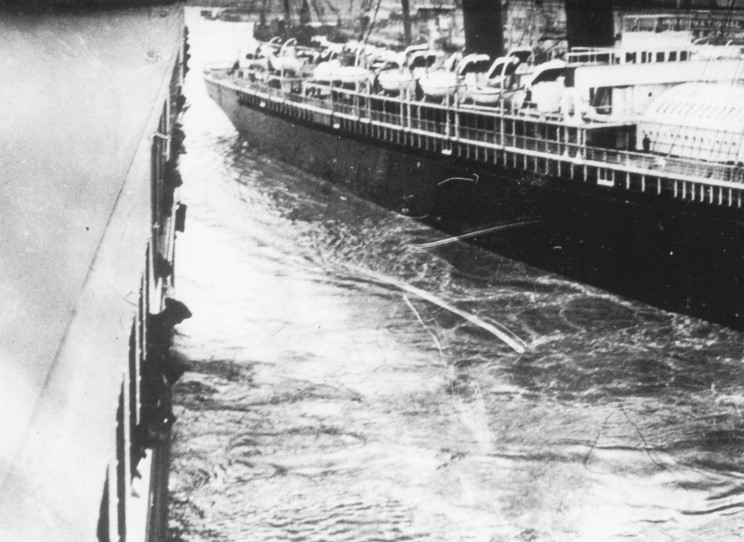
SS New York in her near collision with the Titanic on 10 April 1912

On 10 April 1912, Bowyer took charge of the new White Star liner Titanic at noon, for her maiden voyage. As the ship passed the moored liners RMS Oceanic and SS New York, Titanic's huge displacement caused both of the smaller ships to be lifted by a bulge of water and then dropped into a trough. New York's mooring cables were not able to take the sudden strain and snapped, swinging her around stern-first towards the Titanic.

The tugboat Vulcan came to the rescue by taking New York under tow, and Titanic's Captain Smith ordered her engines to be put "full astern". The two ships avoided a collision by a distance of about 4 feet (1.2 m). Bowyer led the ship out to St. Helen Pilot Boarding Area, near the Isle of Wight, where he disembarked on a pilot boat.

== Personal life ==
Bowyer married Emma Hill in St Matthew's Church, Hampshire, and had nine children together. After his retirement, the family moved to Barton on Sea. His wife Emma died in 1944. Bowyer died in 1945 in Milford on Sea, and was buried next to his wife in All Saints Churchyard, Milford-on-Sea.

Bowyer wrote a memoir Lively Ahoy - Reminiscences of 58 years in the Trinity House Pilotage Service, which came out in 1930.

In 2022, Bowyer's maritime logbooks, pocket compass, stopwatch, and whistle were put on auction at Henry Aldridge & Sons.
