= Great Ashfield =

Village in Suffolk, England

Coordinates: 52.267°N 0.933°E

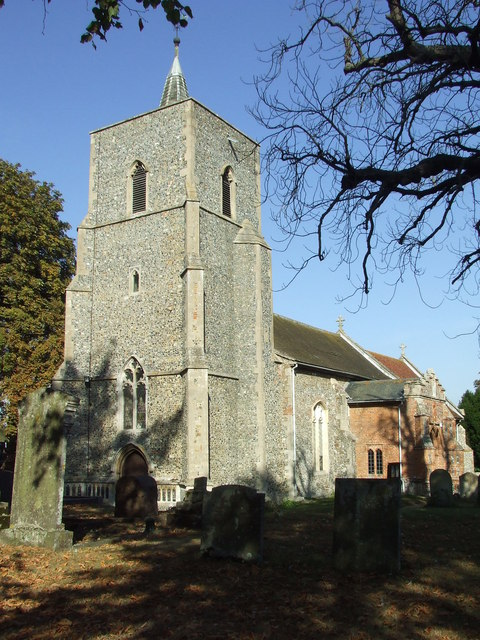
- All Saints' parish church

- Location within Suffolk
- Area: 6.36 km^{2} (2.46 sq mi)
- Population: 378
  - Density: 59/km^{2} (150/sq mi)
- OS grid reference: TL9967
- Civil parish: Great Ashfield
- District: Mid Suffolk
- Shire county: Suffolk
- Region: East
- Country: England
- Sovereign state: United Kingdom
- Post town: Bury St Edmunds
- Postcode district: IP31
- Dialling code: 01359
- Police: Suffolk
- Fire: Suffolk
- Ambulance: East of England
- UK Parliament: Waveney Valley
- Website: Great Ashfield

Great Ashfield is a village and civil parish in Suffolk, England, about 9 miles (14 km) east of Bury St Edmunds.

The Domesday Book of 1086 records the village's toponym as Eascefelda. It means "open land where ash-trees grow".

1/2 mile (800 m) west of the village is the overgrown motte of Great Ashfield Castle.

== Parish church ==
The Church of England parish church of All Saints is built of flint. The oldest parts of the building are 12th-century and the south doorway is 13th-century. The west tower, north aisle and current font were added in the 14th century. In the 15th century new windows were inserted in the nave and the present chancel arch was built. There are also 15th-century benches in the nave. The south porch was added in the 16th century and is built of brick. The altar rails and reredos are 17th-century. The church is a Grade I listed building.

The west tower has a ring of five bells. The third and fourth bells were cast at Bury St Edmunds about 1510. John Draper of Thetford cast the tenor bell in 1631. Thomas Newman of Norwich cast the treble and second bells in 1745.

== Notable residents ==
- Violet Jessop (1887-1971), Argentine ocean liner stewardess, memoirist and nurse who is known for surviving the disastrous sinkings of RMS Titanic in 1912 and her sister ship HMHS Britannic in 1916. In addition, she was onboard RMS Olympic, when it collided with a British warship, HMS Hawke, in 1911.

== See also ==
- RAF Great Ashfield

== Bibliography ==
- Mills, AD; Room, Adrian (2003). A Dictionary of British Place-Names. Oxford: Oxford University Press. p. 14. ISBN 0-19-852758-6.
- Pevsner, Nikolaus; Radcliffe, Enid (revision) (1974) [1961]. Suffolk. The Buildings of England. Harmondsworth: Penguin Books. pp. 232–233. ISBN 0-14-071020-5.
