= Arthur Priest =

British fireman and shipwreck survivor (1887–1937)

- John Priest c. 1912
- Born: 31 August 1887; Southampton, Hampshire England
- Died: 11 February 1937 (aged 49); Southampton, Hampshire, England
- Resting place: Hollybrook Cemetery, Southampton, England
- Other name: Jack
- Occupation: Fireman
- Known for: Surviving multiple shipwrecks, most notable the RMS Titanic
- Spouse: Annie Hampton (m. 1915)
- Children: 3

Arthur John Priest (31 August 1887 – 11 February 1937) was an English stoker who was notable for surviving four ship sinkings, including the RMS Titanic, HMS Alcantara, HMHS Britannic and the SS Donegal. Due to his many escapes, Priest eventually gained the moniker The Unsinkable Stoker.

== Life ==
Priest was the son of Harry Priest, a labourer, and his wife Elizabeth Garner, and was one of twelve children. In 1915, Priest married Annie Hampton in Birkenhead and had three sons; called Arthur John, George and Frederick Harry. The family lived for a number of years at 17 Briton Street, Southampton.

== Career ==
Priest worked as a stoker, in the bowels of steam-powered ships. He was considered a part of the black gang, in a group of 27 men, which consisted of six firemen, two trimmers, and the firemen's steward colloquially known as a 'peggy' whose task was to bring food and refreshments to the group. The work was intense and often done while stripped to the waist due to the sustained and intense heat of the furnaces. Whilst working as a stoker, Priest survived four ship sinkings and two major collisions, most of them during World War I. The ships in question were RMS Asturias (collision on her maiden voyage, 1908), RMS Olympic (collision with HMS Hawke, 1911), RMS Titanic (sunk by an iceberg, 1912), HMS Alcantara (sunk in combat with SMS Greif, 1916), HMHS Britannic (sunk by a mine, 1916) and SS Donegal (torpedoed by SM UC-27, 1917). Two other survivors of the Titanic, Archie Jewell and Violet Jessop, would later also survive the sinking of the Britannic with Priest, with Jewell later being killed on the Donegal. In 1917, Priest was awarded the Mercantile Marine Ribbon for his service in the Great War.

After the sinking of SS Donegal, Priest retired from working at sea and left his job as a stoker. He lived out the rest of his days in Southampton, with his wife Annie. He claimed that "no one wished to sail with him after these disasters."

Other than his survival stories, there is little information about his personal life. According to sources, he died in 1937 at his home in Southampton at the age of 49 from pneumonia with his wife Annie by his side. He is buried at Hollybrook Cemetery in Southampton, England. He was given the nickname "the unsinkable stoker" because of his stories of survival at sea.
