= Archie Jewell =

British merchant sailor (1888–1917)

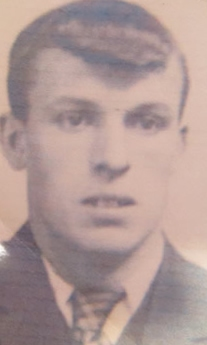
- Jewell during his World War I service
- Born: 4 December 1888; Bude, Cornwall, England
- Died: 17 April 1917 (aged 28); English Channel
- Occupation: Sailor
- Known for: Surviving the sinkings of RMS Titanic and HMHS Britannic
- Spouse: Bessie Heard (m. 1916)
- Children: 1

Archie Jewell (4 December 1888 – 17 April 1917) was a British sailor who was on the crew of the Titanic. He survived the sinking of the Titanic and its sister ship HMHS Britannic, but died during the sinking of the SS Donegal when it was torpedoed without warning by German forces during the course of World War I.

== Life ==
Archie Jewell was the youngest child of John Jewell, a sailor, and his wife Elizabeth Jewell. He had six older siblings, two sisters and four brothers. His mother died on 9 April 1891, shortly after Archie had turned two.

In 1903, at the age of 15, Jewell began working on smaller sailing ships. He joined the White Star Line in 1904. Jewell served as a full seaman on the Oceanic for almost eight years, during which time he lived in Southampton. He was married sometime around 1916 to Bessie Heard and moved to Bitterne with her. Bessie Jewell gave birth to their son, Raymond Hope Jewell, in autumn 1916.

== Career ==
On 6 April 1912 Jewell was transferred to the Titanic as one of six lookouts along with 24-year-old George Symons. Jewell was scheduled to be in the crow's nest between 20:00 and 22:00 and then from 2:00 to 4:00, during the night of 15 April 1912.

At around 22:00 Jewell and Symons were replaced by their colleagues Reginald Lee and Frederick Fleet. Jewell was in his cabin at 23:40 when the iceberg collision occurred. At 00:40, Jewell was one of the first to escape the sinking in lifeboat 7.

After arriving in New York City on the RMS Carpathia, Jewell returned to England on 29 April 1912 on board the SS Lapland. He was among the first witnesses interviewed by Lord Justice Mersey on 3 May 1912 before the British Committee of Inquiry on the accident. At least 331 questions were asked.

Jewell worked on HMHS Britannic during World War I. He survived the sinking of the Britannic on 21 November 1916 along with two other Titanic survivors, Violet Jessop, a stewardess, and Arthur Priest, a stoker.

In 1916 Jewell left the White Star Line and was hired on the SS Donegal, a passenger ship put into service in 1904. The Donegal was converted into a hospital ship during World War I and transported wounded soldiers from France to England. On 1 March 1917 one of these voyages involved contact with a German submarine. Badly damaged, the Donegal managed to reach safety, but it was never repaired. On 17 April 1917 another German submarine fired without warning on the Donegal. The ship went down in the English Channel, about 19 nautical miles (35 km) south of the Dean light vessel. The 28-year-old Jewell was one of the 12 crew members who died, along with 29 British soldiers. Jewell's body was never recovered. Arthur Priest was also on board, but survived.

A plaque commemorates Jewell at the Tower Hill Memorial, in London. Archie Jewell was survived by his wife and son, his father, and all six of his siblings; his son died in Exeter on 10 December 1930, at the age of 14, after a serious illness.
