= Great Ashfield Castle =

Castle in the United Kingdom

- Great Ashfield, Suffolk, England
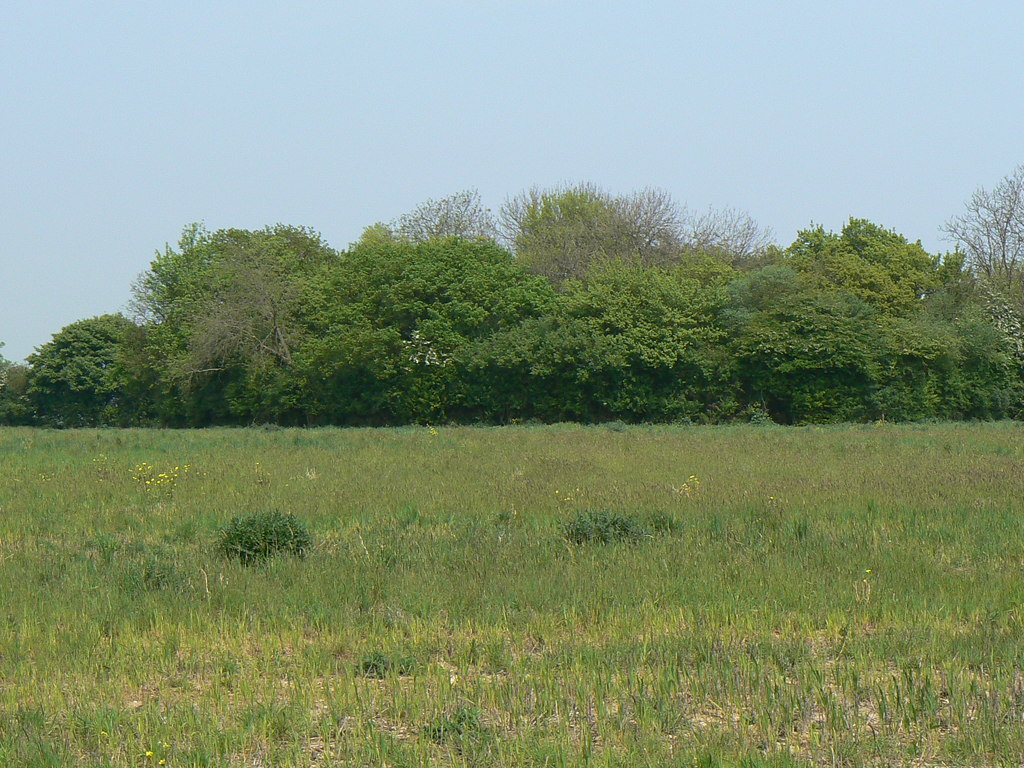
- Overgrown remains of Great Ashfield Castle

Site information
- Type: Motte and bailey
- Condition: Earthworks remain

Location
- Shown within Suffolk
- Coordinates: 52.2696°N 0.9169°E
- Grid reference: grid reference TL991675

Great Ashfield Castle, also known locally as Castle Hill, is a medieval motte and bailey castle near the village of Great Ashfield, Suffolk, England.

== Details ==
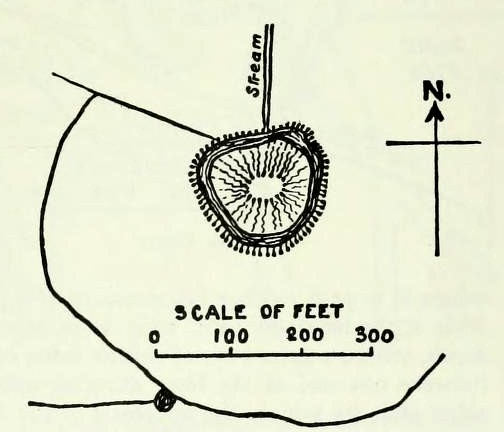
Plan of Great Ashfield Castle in 1911

Great Ashfield Castle is a Norman motte and bailey castle near the village of Great Ashfield in Suffolk. the motte is 130 feet in diameter at the base and 24 feet high. The motte is surrounded by a fosse, 18 feet wide and 7 feet wide, which some investigations have suggested is a later edition to the castle.

Today the castle is a scheduled monument.

== See also ==
- Castles in Great Britain and Ireland
- List of castles in England

== Bibliography ==
- Page, William. (ed) (1911) The Victoria History of Suffolk, Vol. 1. London: University of London.
- Wall, J. C. (1911) "Ancient Earthworks," in Page (ed) (1911).
