= S.O.S. Titanic =

1979 television film by William Hale

- StudioCanal DVD cover
- Genre: Drama; History
- Written by: James Costigan
- Directed by: William Hale
- Starring: David Janssen; Cloris Leachman; Susan Saint James; David Warner; Ian Holm; Helen Mirren; Harry Andrews; Beverly Ross
- Music by: Howard Blake
- Countries of origin: United States/ United Kingdom
- Original language: English

Production
- Executive producer: Roger Gimbel
- Producer: Lou Morheim
- Production locations: RMS Queen Mary - 1126 Queens Highway, Long Beach, California; Shepperton Studios, Shepperton, Surrey, England; The Waldorf Hotel, Aldwych, Strand, London, England
- Cinematography: Christopher Challis
- Editor: Rusty Coppleman
- Running time: Unedited U.S. TV version 144 min. Edited European theatrical version 103 min.
- Production company: EMI Films
- Budget: $5 million 1979 $dollars

Original release
- Network: ABC
- Release: September 23, 1979

S.O.S. Titanic is a 1979 drama disaster television movie that depicts the doomed 1912 maiden voyage of RMS Titanic from the perspective of three distinct groups of passengers in first, second and third class. Produced by EMI Films, the script, written by James Costigan, was based at least in part on survivor Lawrence Beesley's book The Loss of The SS Titanic: Its Story and Its Lessons, by One of the Survivors. The all star cast included David Janssen, Ian Holm, David Warner, Helen Mirren and Cloris Leachman. Directed by William Hale (credited as Billy Hale) with soundtrack by Howard Blake, it is the first Titanic film to be filmed and released in colour, not counting the 1964 musical The Unsinkable Molly Brown.

== Plot ==
First class passengers include a May–December couple, multi-millionaire John Jacob Astor IV (David Janssen) and his new wife Madeleine Talmage Force as they sought to maintain a reputable position in society; their friend, Molly Brown; another pair of honeymooners, Daniel and Mary Marvin; and Benjamin Guggenheim, returning to his wife and children after a scandalous affair.

One plot line relates two schoolteachers, Lawrence Beesley and the fictional Leigh Goodwin, as they hesitantly become involved in a romantic interest in the other.

In steerage, the plot focuses on the experiences of eight Irish immigrants, who board the ship from a tender in the harbor of Queenstown (now Cobh), Ireland. These characters, all based on real people, include Katie Gilnagh, Kate Mullens, Mary Agatha Glynn, Bridget Bradley, Daniel Buckley, Jim Farrell, Martin Gallagher, and David Charters. During the voyage, Martin Gallagher falls for an unnamed "Irish beauty".

== Cast ==
=== Historical characters ===
- David Janssen as John Jacob Astor IV
- Beverly Ross as Madeleine Astor
- Cloris Leachman as Margaret "Molly" Brown
- David Warner as Lawrence Beesley
- Geoffrey Whitehead as Thomas Andrews
- Ian Holm as J. Bruce Ismay
- Helen Mirren as Stewardess Mary Sloan
- Harry Andrews as Captain Edward J. Smith
- Robert Pugh as James Farrell (Irish Traveller in steerage)
- Jerry Houser as Daniel Marvin
- Deborah Fallender as Mary Marvin
- Shevaun Briars as Katie Gilnagh
- Catherine Byrne as Bridget Bradley
- Nick Brimble as Olaus Abelseth
- Norman Rossington as Master-at-arms Thomas King
- Ed Bishop as Henry B. Harris
- Lise Hilboldt as Renee Harris
- John Moffatt as Benjamin Guggenheim
- Aubrey Morris as Steward John Hart
- Nancy Nevinson as Ida Straus
- Gordon Whiting as Isidor Straus
- Peter Bourke as Harold Bride
- Kate Howard as the Noël Leslie, Countess of Rothes
- Madge Ryan as Stewardess Violet Jessop
- Malcolm Stoddard as Second Officer Charles Lightoller
- Philip Stone as Arthur Rostron, the captain of RMS Carpathia
- Christopher Strauli as Harold Cottam, the wireless operator of RMS Carpathia
- Paul Young as First Officer William McMaster Murdoch
- Victor Langley as Wallace Hartley
- Tony Caunter as Chief Officer Henry Tingle Wilde
- Maurice Roëves as Frederick Barrett
- Warren Clarke as Fourth Officer Joseph Boxhall
- Karl Howman as Fifth Officer Harold Lowe
- Matthew Guinness as Father Thomas Byles
- Kevin O'Shea as Lookout Reginald Robinson Lee
- Alec Sabin as Lookout Frederick Fleet
- David Battley as Sydney Frederick Stebbings
- Nicholas Davies as Alfred King
- Gerard McSorley as Martin Gallagher
- Philip O'Sullivan as David Charters
- Jacob Brooke as Steward John Hardy
- Tony Maiden as Elgar John Guy
- Michele O'Connor as Catherine "Kate" Mullin
- Rynagh O'Grady as Mary Agatha Glynn
- Dorothea Phillips as Emma Eliza Bucknell
- Anna Quayle as Maude Louise Slocombe
- Carolle Rousseau as Berthe Antonine Mayné, Madame de Villiers
- Ronan Smith as Daniel Buckley
- Rosemary Leach as Augusta Davies Odgen

=== Fictional characters ===
- Susan Saint James as Leigh Goodwin

Cast notes:

- Norman Rossington previously appeared in A Night to Remember (1958) as a steward.
- David Warner later appeared in the 1997 film Titanic as fictional character Spicer Lovejoy
- Cloris Leachman had previously played Margaret Brown in the 1957 Telephone Time episode "The Unsinkable Molly Brown".
- Helen Mirren has a small role as Mary Sloan, a real-life surviving Titanic stewardess.

== Production ==
The film was greenlit by Bernard Delfont of EMI Films, at the same time as Delfont's brother, Sir Lew Grade, was making a film based on Raise the Titanic. Delfont says Grade was upset about this and asked his brother to stop production but Delfont refused as it was too late. He wrote he consoled "myself with the thought that the market was big enough for the both of us. It was an expensive miscalculation. SOS Titanic and Raise the Titanic were disaster movies in every sense."

Producer William Filmore called it the "thinking man's disaster film".

=== Filming ===
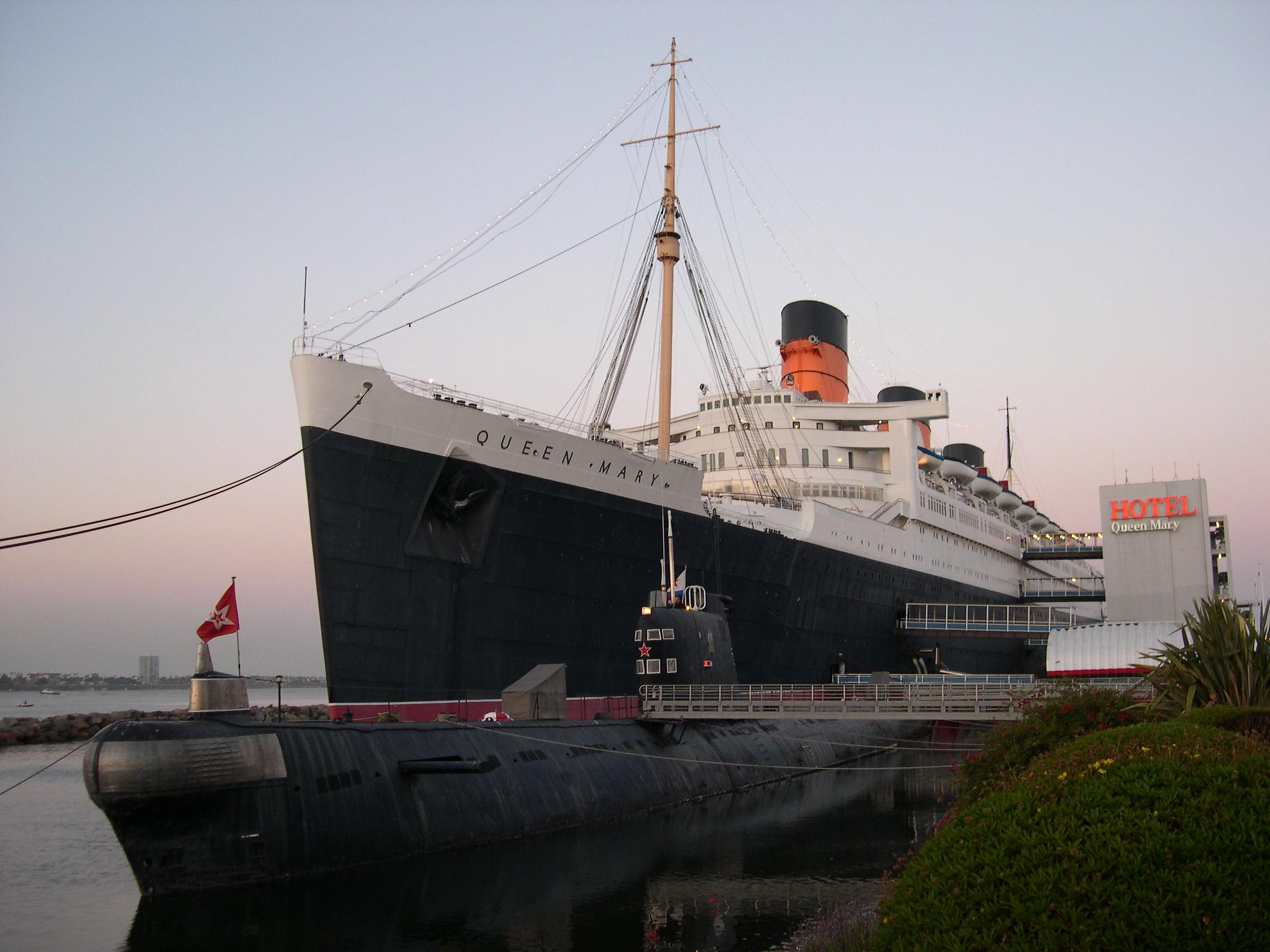
The RMS Queen Mary, which in the movie was partly used as the RMS Titanic

Several of the scenes on the exterior decks, as well as those in the ship's wheelhouse, were filmed on board the later British ocean liner from the 1930s, the retired RMS Queen Mary in Long Beach, California.

Some interior scenes were filmed at the Waldorf and Adelphi historic hotels in London and Liverpool, respectively. The town of Peel on the Isle of Man served as the Queenstown backdrop. Some external shots were filmed aboard, and of, the TSS Manxman which also appears as the R.M.S. Carpathia in some of the opening sequences and as the R.M.S. Titanic in a few shipboard scenes.

=== Versions ===
S.O.S. Titanic was originally broadcast as a television film on ABC on September 23, 1979. It ran for 3 hours, or approximately 144 minutes, excluding commercials. Although this version was shown on TV occasionally and bootleg copies sometimes surfaced on the internet, it was never commercially released until making its debut on home video from Kino Lorber on October 13, 2020, as both a Blu-ray and a two-disc DVD set along with the European theatrical version.

== Reception ==
Film-Authority.com gave the film three out of five stars. DVD Talk praised the movie for its tension building, haunting imagery and immersive sound design. It also notes that the film attempts a nonjudgmental portrayal of Ismay compared to other films about the disaster. Reviewer Glenn Erickson notes that the film depicts an authentically Irish group of shipboard acquaintances and felt the film to be impressive, in spite of its flaws.

== See also ==
- List of films about the RMS Titanic
