= George Symons (sailor) =

British sailor (1888–1950)

George Thomas Macdonald Symons
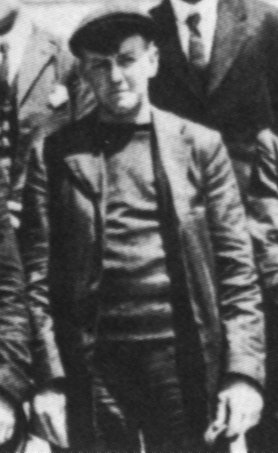
- George Symons in 1912, shortly after the Titanic survivors arrive in New York
- Born: 23 February 1888; Weymouth, England, United Kingdom
- Died: 3 December 1950 (aged 62); Southampton, England, UK
- Occupations: Seaman, Sailor
- Known for: Titanic survivor
- Military career
- Allegiance: United Kingdom
- Branch: Royal Navy
- Service years: 1914–1918
- Conflicts: World War I

George Thomas Macdonald Symons (23 February 1888 – 3 December 1950) was a British sailor who worked as a lookout on board the ill-fated RMS Titanic. Symons, who was 24 at the time of the sinking of the ship, was put in charge of one of the first lifeboats to be launched, lifeboat #1. The boat was an emergency cutter which had a capacity of 40 but was launched with only 12 people on board, including seven crew members, and had gained notoriety after the disaster.

== Early life and Titanic ==
Symons was born in Weymouth, Dorset, England, son of Robert James Symons and Bessie Newman. He was one of thirteen children.

Symons worked with Archie Jewell as a lookout on the Titanic. On the night of 14 April 1912, Symons and Jewell were replaced by their colleagues Reginald Lee and Frederick Fleet and off-duty when the ship struck the iceberg. Shortly afterwards, he was ordered to go up to boat deck and help with the task of loading the lifeboats. At around 1:00 am, First Officer William McMaster Murdoch began to load Boat #1. Murdoch put Symons in charge of the lifeboat and loaded it with five stokers, Sir Cosmo Duff-Gordon, Lucy, Lady Duff-Gordon, her secretary and three other first-class passengers. The boat finally rowed away from the Titanic at 1:05 a.m. The lifeboat was picked by the RMS Carpathia hours later.

On board the Carpathia, Symons stumbled upon his brother Jack who was a crew member of that ship.

== Later life ==
After the sinking, he returned to Britain and married Mary Jane Bolt. The couple had two daughters.

After the outbreak of World War I in 1914, Symons served for the Royal Naval Volunteer Reserve. Then again, Symons ran into his brother Jack and then both ran into their other brother Bob who had been seriously wounded in combat. They all survived the war.

Symons died in Southampton on 3 December 1950.
