= SS Donegal =

British hospital ship during World War I

Coordinates: 50°16′N 1°00′W

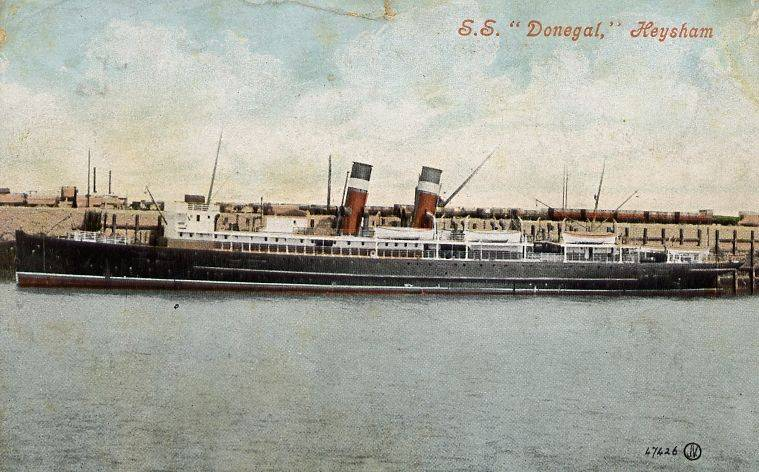
- Donegal in Midland Railway service

History

United Kingdom
- Name: SS Donegal (1904–1914); HMHS Donegal (1914–1917)
- Namesake: County Donegal, Ireland
- Owner: Midland Railway
- Port of registry: (United Kingdom) Belfast (United Kingdom)
- Route: Heysham – Belfast
- Builder: Caird & Company, Greenock
- Yard number: 303
- Launched: 30 April 1904
- Completed: 1904
- Fate: Torpedoed and sunk, 17 April 1917

General characteristics
- Type: Passenger ferry (1904–1914); Hospital ship (1914–1917)
- Tonnage: 1,885 GRT
- Length: 331 ft (101 m)
- Beam: 42.1 ft (12.8 m)
- Draught: 17.2 ft (5.2 m)
- Installed power: 386 NHP
- Propulsion: triple-expansion steam engine; screw
- Speed: 13 knots (24 km/h; 15 mph)
- Capacity: 610 (as hospital ship)
- Crew: 70 (as hospital ship)
- Notes: sister ship: SS Antrim

HMHS Donegal was a Midland Railway passenger ferry that served in the First World War as a hospital ship. She was completed in 1904 and sunk by enemy action in April 1917.

== Building and peacetime service ==
From 1897 to 1903 the Midland Railway of England had Heysham Port on the coast of Lancashire built as a terminal for ferries to and from Ireland. In 1903 the Midland established its interest in Ireland by buying the Belfast and Northern Counties Railway. In 1904 the Midland took delivery of a pair of new passenger ferries from Clydeside shipyards in Glasgow and Greenock to work between Heysham Port and Belfast Harbour. They came from different builders but they were sister ships: Antrim built by John Brown & Company of Clydebank, and Donegal built by Caird & Company of Greenock.

Donegal had a triple-expansion steam engine rated at 386 nominal horsepower, giving her a speed of 13 knots (24 km/h; 15 mph). She and Antrim worked between Heysham and Belfast from 1904 until they were requisitioned for government service in the First World War.

== War service and loss ==
Approximate position of Donegal's wreck off the French coast in the English Channel

Donegal was one of numerous ferries, many of them requisitioned from railway companies, that were converted into ambulance ships to carry wounded personnel from France back to Great Britain. Ambulance ships were classified as hospital ships under Hague Convention X of 1907 and as such were to be clearly marked and lit to make them easy to identify. Nevertheless, in the First World War the Imperial German Navy attacked and sank a number of British hospital ships. The UK Government then announced it would cease marking hospital ships, alleging that German vessels had used their markings and lighting to target them, so Donegal was unmarked.

On 1 March 1917 a German submarine tried to attack Donegal but the steamer managed to outrun her. Then on 17 April 1917 both Donegal and a larger ship, HMHS Lanfranc, were sunk by U-boats when carrying British wounded across the English Channel.

Donegal had sailed from Le Havre bound for Southampton carrying 610 lightly wounded soldiers and 70 crew. She had a Royal Navy escort. She was about 19 nautical miles (35 km; 22 mi) south of the Dean light vessel when the German Type UC II submarine UC-21 torpedoed her. She sank with the loss of 29 wounded British soldiers and 12 of her crew.

A Royal Naval Reserve officer, Lieutenant Harold Holehouse, jumped from his ship into the sea to recover one of Donegal's wounded soldiers from the water. Although he successfully pulled the soldier out of the water and onto a rescue craft, the man did not survive. Lt. Holehouse's actions led to the Royal Humane Society awarding him its bronze medal.

== Titanic connections ==
Two of Donegal's crew, Archie Jewell and Arthur Priest, had served on RMS Titanic and survived her sinking in April 1912. Jewell had been one of Titanic's lookouts (although not on watch when she struck the iceberg) and Priest had been one of her stokers. Priest had also been on the liner RMS Asturias on her collision on her maiden voyage in 1908, and on RMS Olympic when she was damaged in a collision with HMS Hawke in 1911.

Priest then served on the armed merchant cruiser Alcantara when she and the German armed merchant cruiser SMS Greif sank each other in February 1916. Both Jewell and Priest then served on Titanic's White Star Line sister ship HMHS Britannic, and survived when she was sunk in November 1916. When Donegal sank, Priest survived yet again but Jewell was killed. In 1917 Priest was awarded the Mercantile Marine Ribbon for his service in the war.

== Wreck ==
Donegal's wreck lies intact on her port side in about 45 to 50 metres (148 to 164 ft) of water.

== See also ==
- List of hospital ships sunk in World War I

== Sources ==
- The War on Hospital Ships, With Narratives of Eye-Witnesses and British and German Diplomatic Correspondence (Second and Revised ed.). New York and London: Harper and Brothers. 1918. p. 16.
- Durham, Dick (25 November 2008). "Died at sea". Yachting Monthly. IPC Media.
