= Lawrence Beesley =

English teacher and RMS Titanic survivor (1877–1967)

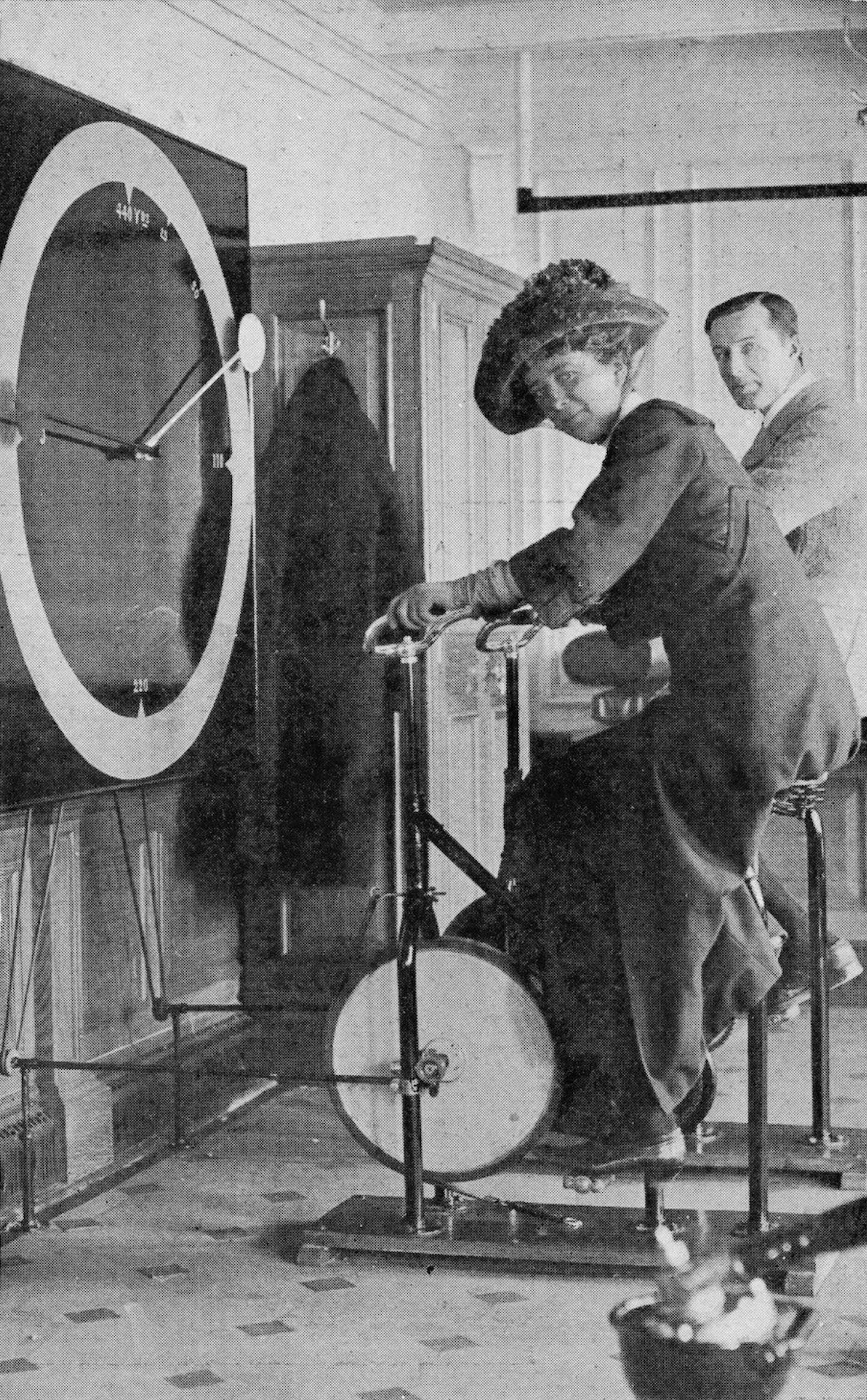
- Lawrence Beesley (back) in the Gymnastics Room of Titanic
- Born: 31 December 1877; Wirksworth, Derbyshire, England
- Died: 14 February 1967 (aged 89); Lincoln, Lincolnshire, England
- Education: Derby School
- Alma mater: Caius College, Cambridge
- Occupations: Teacher, Author
- Known for: Surviving the sinking of RMS Titanic
- Notable work: The Loss of The SS Titanic (1912)
- Spouse(s): Gertrude Cecile "Cissie" Macbeth (m. 1901; died 1906) Muriel "Mollie" Brownjohn Greenwood (m. 1919)
- Children: 4
- Relatives: Dodie Smith (daughter-in-law); Nicholas Wade (grandson)

Lawrence Beesley (31 December 1877 – 14 February 1967) was an English science teacher and author who was a survivor of the sinking of RMS Titanic.

== Education ==
Beesley was educated at Derby School, where he was a scholar, and afterwards at Caius College, Cambridge, again as a scholar. He took a First Class degree in the Natural Science tripos in 1903.

== Career ==
Beginning as a schoolmaster at Wirksworth Grammar School in Derbyshire, he moved to Dulwich College in south London, where he was a science master. In 1957 he was still teaching as Principal of the Northwood School of Coaching, Northwood, Middlesex.

== RMS Titanic ==
A second class passenger, Beesley is one of the survivors of the sinking of Titanic in April 1912. He wrote a successful book about his experience, The Loss of the SS Titanic (June 1912), published just nine weeks after the disaster.

Lifeboat No.13 was being launched on the Boat Deck, no women or children were in immediate sight, but it seemed there was room for more. As a result, Beesley was instructed to jump into the lifeboat just before it launched. He managed to survive a subsequent incident where Lifeboat No.15 nearly landed on top of No.13. The leading stoker of boiler room No.6, Frederick Barrett, managed to cut the ropes connecting the boat to the falls at the last minute, and those in both boats emerged unharmed. Beesley and the rest of the survivors were picked up by RMS Carpathia in the early morning of 15 April.

== Later life and legacy ==
Beesley was portrayed by actor David Warner (who later played fictional character Spicer Lovejoy in James Cameron's 1997 Titanic film) in the 1979 dramatisation of the voyage and sinking, S.O.S. Titanic. Beesley was also portrayed by Lawrence Bennett in the 1999 musical stage adaptation Titanic. His son Alec married the author Dodie Smith, and he is the grandfather of New York Times science editor Nicholas Wade.

In a scene in Julian Barnes' novel A History of the World in 10½ Chapters, a fictionalized Beesley makes a brief appearance. In the scene, Beesley is a consultant on the 1958 film A Night to Remember and attempts to stay on the set during a sinking scene. However, he was spotted by the director, Roy Ward Baker, who vetoed this unscheduled appearance due to actors' union rules.

== Publication ==
- The Loss of The SS Titanic: Its Story and Its Lessons, by One of the Survivors (June 1912)
- The Loss of The SS Titanic (new edition, Mariner Books, 2000) ISBN 0-618-05531-2
