= Frederick Barrett =

English stoker and Titanic survivor (1883–1931)

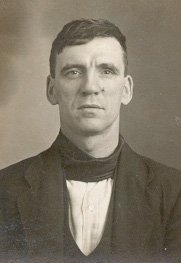
- Born: 10 January 1883; Bootle, Lancashire, England
- Died: March 3, 1931 (aged 48); Liverpool, Lancashire, England
- Other name: Fred
- Occupation: Fireman
- Known for: Leading fireman and survivor of RMS Titanic
- Spouse: Mary Anne Jones (m. 1915; died 1923)
- Children: Harold Barrett

Frederick William Barrett (10 January 1883 – 3 March 1931) was a British fireman who was one of the leading firemen aboard the RMS Titanic and was in Boiler Room No. 6 when the ship struck the iceberg, opening several compartments to the ocean. While the ship was sinking, Barrett boarded lifeboat No. 13 and was given command of it, thus surviving the disaster. He later testified before commissions of inquiry into the sinking of the ship and continued to work in the merchant marine until the 1920s.

== Early life and career ==
Frederick William Barrett was born on 10 January 1883 in Bootle, near Liverpool. He was the only surviving child of Henry Charles Barrett (1862–1909), a Devon workman, and Mary Barrett (née Morgan) (1864–?) of Birkenhead. On 4 October of the same year, he was baptised at St. John's Church in Bootle.

Little is known about his youth, but the census of 1891 indicates that he was described as being a "carman" and his father was described as being a timber labourer.

The date of Barrett's first trip to sea is uncertain but it was likely around the early 1900s. In 1903, he joined the Cunard Liner RMS Campania as a stoker. In 1904, he joined the Allan Liner Parisian, and then the White Star Liner RMS Cedric. In 1906, he served again aboard Campania. He then joined the American Line ship City of New York.

== Aboard Titanic ==
=== Crossing and collision ===
Barrett signed on as leading fireman aboard RMS Titanic on 6 April 1912. (Note: Barrett is not to be confused with a fellow crewmember, another stoker named Frederick William Barrett (born in 1879), who died in the sinking.) He was a lead stoker working in boiler room 6 when the Titanic struck an iceberg on the night of 14 April 1912. Boiler room 6 was at the site of the impact with the iceberg.

Barrett was talking to the second engineer John Henry Hesketh, when the red light and bells came on signalling the order to stop the engines. He shouted to the men in the boiler room to shut the dampers, the doors to the furnaces and to shut off the wind for the fires. Then he felt a crash, and water came pouring in on him from a large tear in the ship's starboard side. Barrett made his way through the watertight door into boiler room 5. He was ordered to go back into boiler room 6, but there was 8 feet of water there. As some of the engineers attended the pumps, the engine room rang for all the stokers to go up on deck. Barrett was ordered to stay behind by an engineer, Mr. Harvey, in boiler room 5 to get some lamps, draw fires, and lift the manhole plate until water started to rush in.

=== Aboard lifeboat 13 ===
Barrett went up along a hatchway to reach the starboard side of A Deck, where there were only two lifeboats left. He left the sinking ship on lifeboat 13, which was filled with about 65 to 70 people.

As the boat touched the water, water from the main discharge caused a current which led to No. 13 drifting under Lifeboat 15 which nearly came down on top of their lifeboat, but they got out in time. Lawrence Beesley, also in Lifeboat 13, recalled a fireman taking his knife and cutting away the falls just in time and averting a potential disaster. This fireman was Barrett who later testified that he had to cut the falls away and allowing No. 13 to get away from under No. 15.

Barrett took charge of the lifeboat for about an hour, saying, "I did not see anybody that was going to take charge of the boat. The rudder was lying in the stern at the bottom, and I shipped the rudder and took charge of the boat till after the Titanic sank." Due to wearing his thin gear only, Barrett later said he became numb with cold and let someone else take over the tiller. At one point a woman put a cloak over him, and he was unable to remember anything that took place after that in the lifeboat. At 4:45 am, Barrett and the others in the lifeboat were rescued by the RMS Carpathia.

=== Inquiries ===
After the sinking, he testified at both the British Wreck Commissioner's inquiry and United States Senate inquiry into the sinking of the Titanic.

On 25 May 1912, just a few weeks after the sinking, Barrett was working on Titanic's sister ship RMS Olympic, where he was questioned by Senator William Alden Smith as part of the U.S. inquiry.

== Personal life ==
In 1915, Barrett married Mary Anne Jones. Their only surviving child was a son named Harold. In 1923, Mary died. Barrett never remarried and remained in Liverpool and worked ashore as a logger.

Barrett died in Liverpool on 3 March 1931 due to tuberculosis.

Harold Barrett was raised by an uncle in Bootle and he later married Josephine Teresa Berry in 1951 with whom he had twins, Frederick and Susan (b. 1955). Harold died in Liverpool in 1974.

== Portrayals ==
- Jack Stewart (1958) (A Night to Remember)
- Maurice Roëves (1979) (S.O.S. Titanic) (TV film)
- Derek Lea (1997) (Titanic)
- Brian d'Arcy James (1997) (Titanic: The Musical)
- Gary Cargill (2008) The Unsinkable Titanic (Documentary)
- Phil Cheadle (2011) "What Sank Titanic" Curiosity (TV series) (Season 1: Episode 4)
- Ciarán McMenamin (2012) (Saving the Titanic)
- Ciaran McCourt (2025) (Titanic Sinks Tonight)
