= Reginald Lee =

Lookout and survivor of R.M.S. Titanic

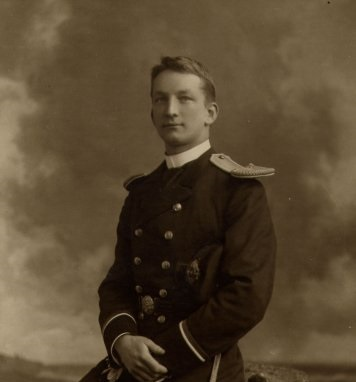
- Lee in his Royal Navy uniform, c. 1900
- Born: 19 May 1870; Bensington, Oxfordshire, England
- Died: 6 August 1913 (aged 43); Southampton, Hampshire, England
- Occupations: Merchant sailor, Lookout
- Spouse: Emily Selina Hannah Hill (m. 1897)
- Military career
- Allegiance: United Kingdom
- Branch: Royal Navy
- Service years: 1887–1900
- Rank: Assistant-Paymaster

Reginald Robinson Lee (19 May 1870 – 6 August 1913) was a British sailor who served as a lookout aboard the Titanic in April 1912. He was on duty with Frederick Fleet in the crow's nest when the ship collided with an iceberg at 23:40 on 14 April 1912 and subsequently survived the sinking. Lee died in August 1913, over a year after the Titanic disaster, the first surviving crewmember to die.

== Early years ==
Lee was born in Bensington, Oxfordshire, one of six surviving children of William Lee and Jane Sarah (née Jackson), both of whom were school teachers. When Lee was young, the family moved to Hampshire, first to Whitchurch and then settling in Southsea.

In 1897, Lee married Emily Hill in Portsea, Hampshire. The couple had no children.

== Seafaring career ==
=== Royal Navy ===
Lee joined the Royal Navy in 1887 as a clerk and was promoted to as Assistant-Paymaster in 1891. During this time, Lee developed a serious drinking problem which became an issue with his superiors. He was sent home from a posting in Jamaica in February 1898 suffering from delerium tremens.

Eventually, his drinking led to the Royal Navy discharging him in 1900, stating that his duty was "not at all satisfactory" and that he "cannot be trusted where liquor is obtainable."

=== Merchant Navy and Titanic ===
Lee eventually began working with British Merchant fleet. In the 1911 consensus, he was listed as being a stevedore. He had worked as a lookout on several ships, including the RMS Olympic, from which he was transferred to the brand new liner, the RMS Titanic.

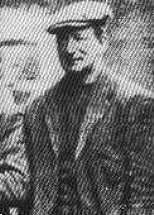
Lee during the British inquiry of the Titanic disaster

Lee joined the Titanic's crew on 6 April 1912, in Southampton. He was listed as a "special lookout" and, as with the rest of the lookouts, held a British Board of Trade certificate, qualifying him as a lookout. For the voyage, he was paired up with lookout Frederick Fleet.

On 14 April at 22:00, Lee and Fleet in the crow's nest, replacing Archie Jewell and George Symons. They were instructed to keep a lookout for "small ice and growlers." There were no binoculars available for the lookouts aboard Titanic, so the lookouts relied on their own eyesight; it is highly doubtful the use of binoculars would have aided in spotting the iceberg due to how dark it was that night, and several captains later testified they never provided lookout men with binoculars as their job was to alert the bridge to what was ahead, not identify it.

When the Titanic began to founder, Lee was ordered to man lifeboat No. 13, which was launched from the ship's starboard side at 01:30. As a result, Lee survived the sinking, as did Fleet. While Fleet and Lee were both detained in New York, only Fleet testified at the American inquiry. Lee returned to England aboard the RMS Celtic, along with Quartermaster Robert Hichens, where both men testified before the Board of Trade inquiry into the disaster.

At the inquiry, Lee claimed he saw a haze on the horizon ahead of them, and that Fleet told him, "Well, if we can see through that we will be lucky." However, Fleet did not back Lee up on the matter, instead saying that there was a slight haze but "it was nothing to talk about."

He soon returned to sea, and was serving aboard the RMS Kenilworth Castle in July 1913.

== Death ==
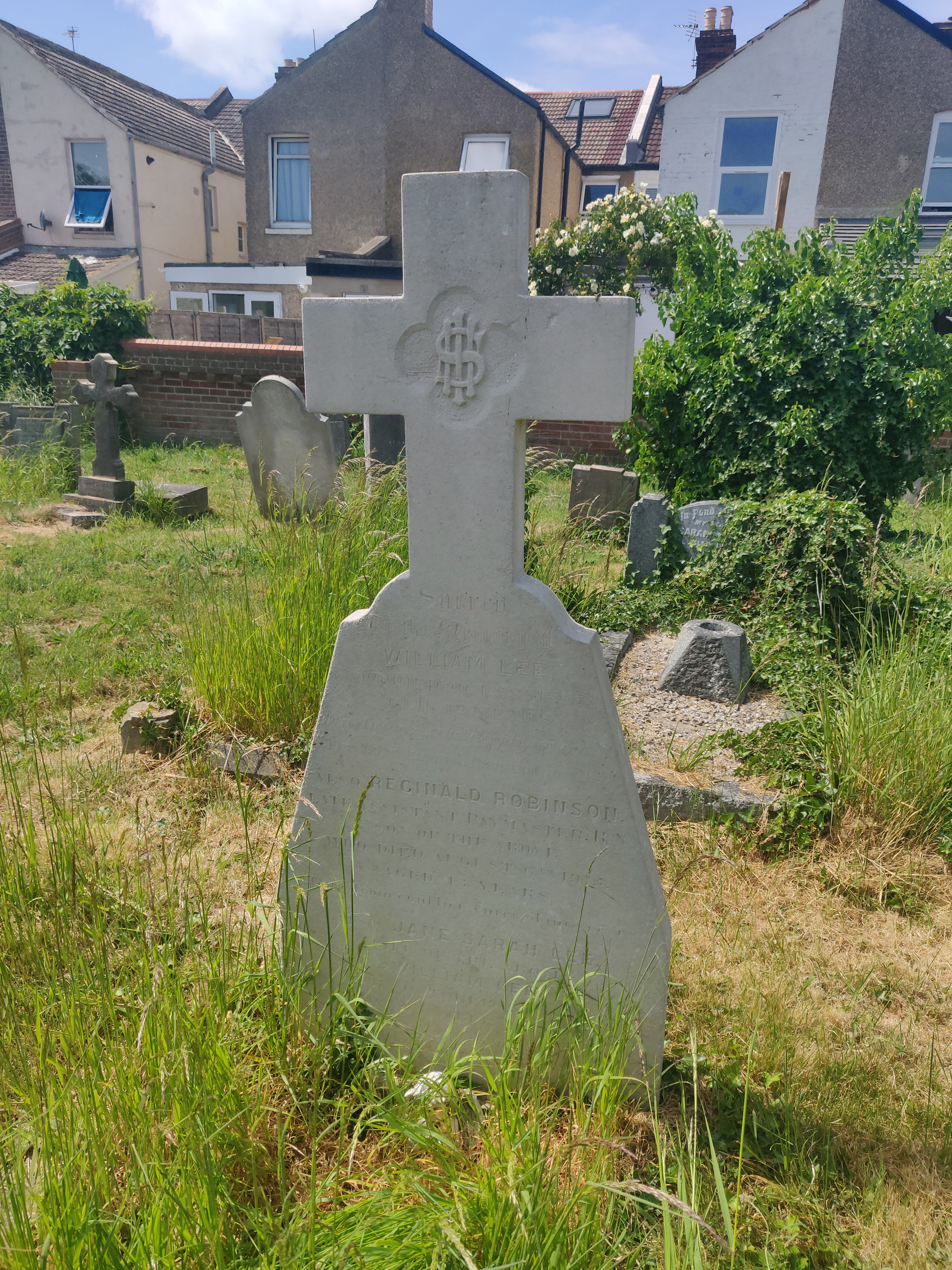
Lee's grave in Highland Road Cemetery, in Southsea, Portsmouth

In July 1913, Lee returned to living at the Sailors' Home in Southampton but was unwell and breathing heavily, and was told to go see a doctor. He was found dead in his room lying face down and partially dressed, on 6 August 1913. Post-mortem revealed that he had an enlarged heart and died of heart failure following pneumonia and pleurisy. Aged 43 years old at the time, he was the first surviving Titanic crewmember to die.

Lee was buried in Highland Road Cemetery in Southsea, Hampshire.

== Portrayals ==
- Roger Avon (1958) - A Night to Remember
- Kevin O'Shea (1979) - S.O.S. Titanic
- Aaron Pearl (1996) - Titanic
- Martin East (1997) - Titanic
- Martin East (2005) - Last Mysteries of the Titanic (Documentary)
- Richard Clements (2012) - Save Our Souls: The Titanic Inquiry (TV film)
- Tom Leigh (2023) – Fred (short film)
