= Barford, Warwickshire =

Village in Warwickshire, England

Coordinates: 52.245°N 1.605°W

Barford
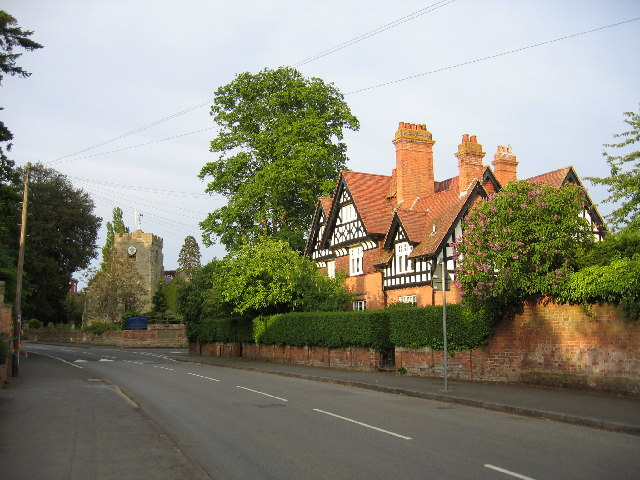
- Church Street and St Peter's Church

- Location within Warwickshire
- Population: 1,336 (2011 census)
- Civil parish: Barford
- District: Warwick
- Shire county: Warwickshire
- Region: West Midlands
- Country: England
- Sovereign state: United Kingdom
- Post town: Warwick
- Postcode district: CV35
- Police: Warwickshire
- Fire: Warwickshire
- Ambulance: West Midlands
- UK Parliament: Warwick and Leamington

Barford is a village and civil parish in the Warwick district of Warwickshire, England, about 3 miles (4.8 km) south of Warwick. As of the 2001 census, the parish had a population of 1,171, which increased to 1,336 as of the 2011 census. The Joint parish council also runs the villages of Sherbourne and Wasperton.

In March 2014, The Sunday Times listed the village as one of the Top 10 places to live in The Midlands. The village has two pubs, a hotel with swimming pool, and a village shop owned and run by the community.

The Church of England primary school in the village is called "Barford St. Peters".

The University of Warwick Boat Club trains on the River Avon at Barford.

== Transport ==
Barford is served by Stagecoach Midlands. Routes run to Leamington Spa, Warwick, Stratford-upon-Avon and Wellesbourne.

The M40 motorway is just 1.5 miles (2.4 km) from the village, with Warwick and Warwick Parkway railway stations just over 4 miles (6.4 km) away.

== History ==
Barford is mentioned in the Domesday Book as a fair-sized settlement situated in the hundred of Tremlowe and in Warwickshire with a water mill.

St Peter's Parish Church dates back to the 14th century although largely rebuilt in 1844 by Richard Charles Hussey, sponsored by Louisa Ryland. The floors are paved with local Wilmcote stone.

Westham House on Westham Lane is now cut off from the rest of the village by the A429 bypass. It was originally a 16th-century farmhouse, before being rebuilt in the 18th century as a gentleman's hunting lodge. In World War II, the house was used by Seaford Ladies College. It is now converted into apartments.

Barford House is a fine Grade II* listed Regency house, located on the main Wellesbourne Road through the village. Evelyn Waugh was a frequent visitor in the 1920s and 1930s.

A private asylum operated in Barford from 1833 until the early 1850s.

== Notable people ==
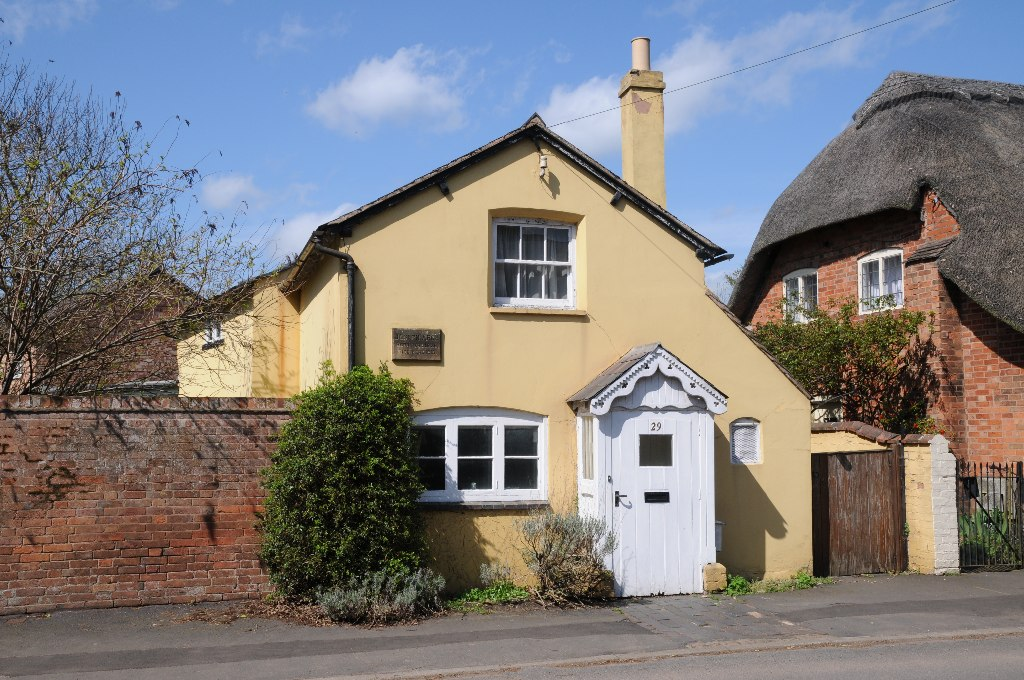
Joseph Arch's Cottage in Barford.

- Joseph Arch (1826–1919), first president of the National Agricultural Labourers Union and Liberal MP. One of the two pubs in Barford is named after him and he is buried at St Peter's Church.
- Annie Butler (4 June 1897 – 28 September 2009), English supercentenarian, who, aged 112, was the second-oldest person in the United Kingdom until her death in 2009.
- John Fairfax (24 October 1804 – 16 June 1877), English-born journalist, is notable for the incorporation of the major newspapers of modern-day Australia.
- William Ivens (1878 – 1957), a religious and political figure in Manitoba.
- Louisa Ryland (b.1814), heiress and philanthropist.
- Wenman Wykeham-Musgrave (1899–1989), a Royal Navy officer who survived being torpedoed on three different ships on the same day in the action of 22 September 1914.

== In fiction ==
C. P. Snow's novel The New Men (1954) is set as a British nuclear experimental establishment in Barford, where the characters try to build a nuclear pile and harvest enough enriched uranium or plutonium to beat US atomic bomb development.

Snow's characters are portrayed as Cambridge dons, so he did not use the real United Kingdom nuclear Centre at Harwell, with its close association to Oxford. The novel describes the location: "For a site, they picked on a place called Barford – which I had not heard of, but found to be a village in Warwickshire, a few miles from Stratford-upon-Avon."
