= Wenman Wykeham-Musgrave =

- Nickname: Kit
- Born: 4 April 1899; Barford, Warwickshire, England
- Died: 13 July 1989 (aged 90) Cirencester, Gloucestershire, England
- Allegiance: United Kingdom
- Branch: Royal Navy
- Rank: Commander
- Awards: First World War: The Action of 22 September 1914

Wenman Humfry "Kit" Wykeham-Musgrave (4 April 1899 – 13 July 1989) was a Royal Navy officer who has the possibly unique distinction of having survived being torpedoed on three different ships on the same day.

He was born on 4 April 1899 at Barford, Warwick, Warwickshire, England, the son of Herbert Wenman Wykeham-Musgrave and his wife Gertrude St. Aubyn Walrond, daughter of the Rev. Main Swete Alexander Walrond. He was educated at Royal Naval College, Osborne, Isle of Wight, and at Royal Naval College, Dartmouth

He was serving as a midshipman aboard HMS Aboukir when, on the morning of 22 September 1914, HMS Aboukir, HMS Hogue and HMS Cressy, three armoured cruisers, were on patrol in the Broad Fourteens off the Dutch coast. They were attacked by the German U-Boat U-9, which was under the command of Kapitänleutnant Otto Weddigen. Wykeham-Musgrave's daughter, Pru Bailey-Hamilton, recounted the tale of his torpedoing during a BBC interview in 2003: "He went overboard when the Aboukir was going down and he swam like mad to get away from the suction. He was then just getting on board the Hogue and she was torpedoed. He then went and swam to the Cressy and she was also torpedoed. He eventually found a bit of driftwood, became unconscious and was eventually picked up by a Dutch trawler."

Wykeham-Musgrave survived the war and re-joined the Royal Navy in 1939, reaching the rank of commander.

== See also ==
- Violet Jessop, ocean liner stewardess and nurse who survived three disastrous maritime incidents, notably aboard RMS Titanic, HMHS Britannic and RMS Olympic
