= HMS Hawke (1891) =

British Royal Navy cruiser (1891–1914)

Coordinates: 57°47′05″N 00°11′50″E

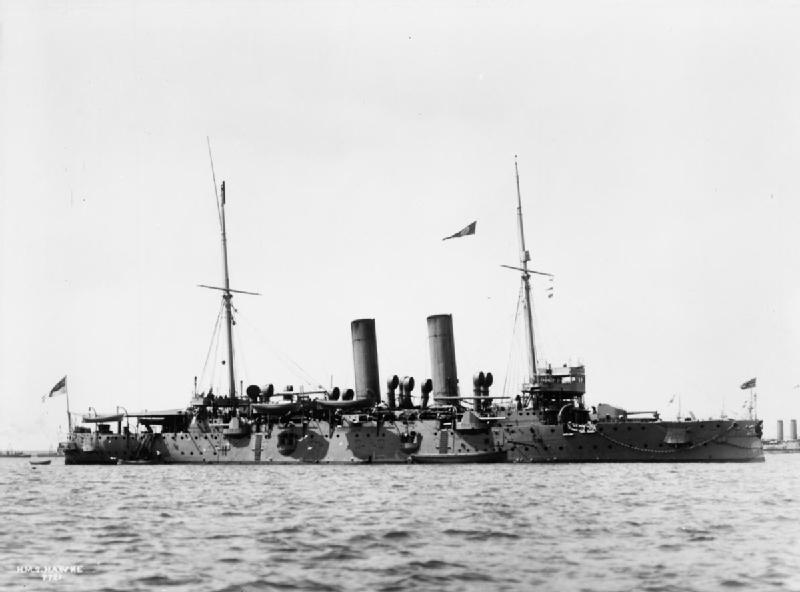
- HMS Hawke

History

United Kingdom
- Name: HMS Hawke
- Builder: Chatham Dockyard
- Laid down: 17 June 1889
- Launched: 11 March 1891
- Fate: Sunk, 15 October 1914

General characteristics
- Class & type: Edgar-class protected cruiser
- Displacement: 7,770 long tons (7,895 t)
- Length: 387 ft (118.0 m)
- Beam: 60 ft (18.3 m)
- Draught: 24 ft (7.3 m)
- Installed power: 12,000 ihp (8,900 kW)
- Propulsion: 2 × steam engines; 2 × shafts
- Speed: 20 knots (37 km/h; 23 mph)
- Range: 10,000 nmi (11,510 mi; 18,520 km) at 10 knots (18.5 km/h; 11.5 mph)
- Complement: 544
- Armament: 2 × BL 9.2 in (234 mm) Mk VI guns; 10 × QF 6 in (152 mm) guns; 12 × 6 pdr (2.7 kg) guns

HMS Hawke, launched in 1891 from Chatham Dockyard, was the seventh Royal Navy warship to be named Hawke. She was an Edgar-class protected cruiser.

After commissioning in 1893, Hawke served in the Mediterranean Fleet, the International Squadron during the Cretan Revolt (1897–1898), and various other duties, including transporting relief crews to naval stations. In September 1911, Hawke collided with the ocean liner RMS Olympic; the damage smashed Hawke's bow. During World War I, Hawke was part of the 10th Cruiser Squadron, performing blockade duties. She was sunk by the German U-boat U-9 in the North Sea in October 1914, resulting in the loss of 524 crew members.

The wreck of Hawke was discovered in August 2024, 70 miles (110 km) off the coast of Scotland.

== Construction ==
Hawke was laid down at Chatham Dockyard on 17 June 1889, one of nine Edgar-class cruisers ordered for the Royal Navy under the Naval Defence Act 1889, and launched on 11 March 1891. Sea trials in March 1892 were satisfactory, with her engines reaching the required power, and the ship was completed on 16 May 1893.

Hawke was 387 feet 6 inches (118.11 m) long overall and 360 feet (109.73 m) between perpendiculars, with a beam of 60 feet (18.29 m) and a draught of 23 feet 9 inches (7.24 m). She displaced 7,350 long tons (7,468 t).

Armament consisted of two 9.2-inch (234 mm) guns, on the ship's centreline, backed up by ten 6-inch (152 mm) guns, of which four were in casemates on the main deck and the remainder behind open shields. Twelve 6-pounder and four 3-pounder guns provided anti-torpedo-boat defences, while four 18-inch (457 mm) torpedo tubes were fitted. The Edgars were protected cruisers, with an arched, armoured deck 5–3 inches (127–76 mm) thick at about waterline level. The casemate armour was 6 inches (152 mm) thick, with 3-inch (76 mm) thick shields for the 9.2-inch (234 mm) guns and 10 inches (254 mm) of armour on the ship's conning tower.

Hawke's machinery was built by Fairfields, with four double-ended cylindrical boilers feeding steam at 150 pounds per square inch (1,000 kPa) to two 3-cylinder triple expansion engines, which drove two shafts. This gave 12,000 indicated horsepower (8,900 kW) under forced draught, giving a speed of 20 knots (37 km/h; 23 mph).

== Service ==
On commissioning, Hawke joined the Mediterranean Fleet, remaining on that station for most of the rest of the decade.

In early 1897, Hawke deployed to Crete to serve in the International Squadron, a multinational force made up of ships of the Austro-Hungarian Navy, French Navy, Imperial German Navy, Italian Royal Navy (Regia Marina), Imperial Russian Navy, and Royal Navy that intervened in the 1897–1898 Greek uprising on Crete against rule by the Ottoman Empire. The uprising prompted Greece to land a Greek Army expeditionary force of 1,500 men on Crete to support the Cretan insurgency, which in turn precipitated the outbreak of the Greco-Turkish War of 1897, also known as the Thirty Days War, in April 1897. The war ended in a quick and disastrous Greek defeat, and the ceasefire agreement required the Greek Army to withdraw from Crete. Accordingly, the Greek expeditionary force embarked aboard Hawke on 23 May 1897 for transportation to Greece. The uprising on Crete continued, however, and the International Squadron continued to operate off Crete until December 1898. In August 1901 Hawke was paid off at Chatham and placed in the Fleet Reserve.

In February 1902 she received orders to prepare to convey relief crews to the Cape of Good Hope Station, and she was commissioned for this duty on 1 April. She left Chatham the following week with new crews for the British vessels Forte, Dwarf and Partridge, and arrived at Simon's Town on 10 May. She left South Africa ten days later, stopping at Saint Helena, Ascension, Sierra Leone, Las Palmas and Madeira before she arrived at Plymouth on 16 June 1902. She took part in the fleet review held at Spithead on 16 August 1902 for the coronation of King Edward VII. Following the review she left Chatham to convey relief crews for the vessels HMS Vulcan, HMS Foam, HMS Bruizer, HMS Dragon, and HMS Boxer, all serving in the Mediterranean. She arrived at fleet headquarters at Malta on 27 August. She returned to Chatham the following month with the relieved crews of Vulcan, Boxer, Bruiser, and Foam. She paid off into the A division of the Fleet Reserve at Chatham on 4 October 1902.

In January 1903, she was again ordered to convey relief crews to ships on the Mediterranean station, this time HMS Pyramus, HMS Speedy, HMS Dryad, and HMS Imogene, all recommissioned for new terms on the station, and she left Sheerness for Malta on 23 January, arriving there in early February, and returned home again after a couple of days. The ship paid off at Chatham on 21 February 1903.

In November 1904, Hawke became Boy's Training Ship as part of the 4th Cruiser Squadron, serving in that role until August 1906, when she joined the torpedo school at Sheerness. In 1907, Hawke joined the Home Fleet.

=== Collision with the liner Olympic ===
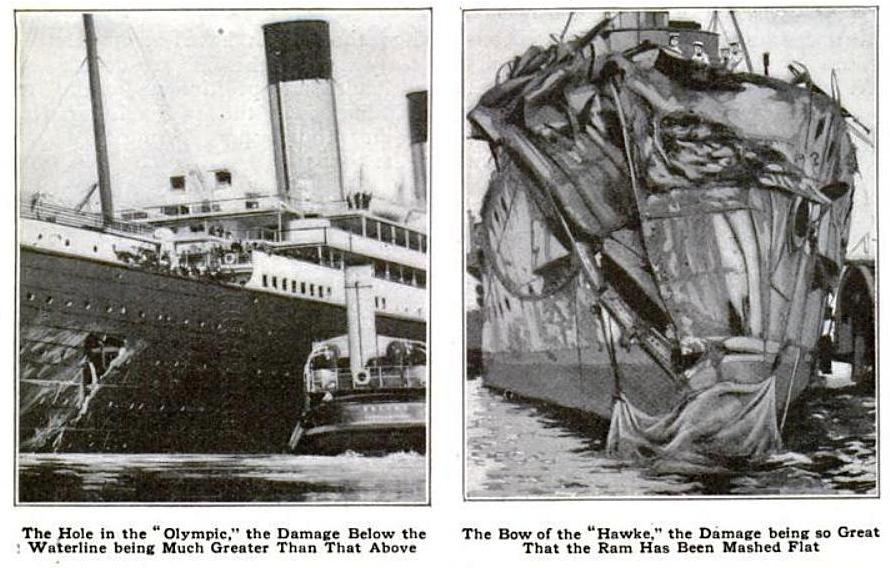
Photographs documenting the damage to Olympic (left) and Hawke (right) following their collision

On 20 September 1911, Hawke collided in the Solent with the White Star ocean liner RMS Olympic, captained by Edward Smith, who died seven months later as captain of Olympic's sister ship, RMS Titanic. In the course of the collision, Hawke lost her inverted bow, which was replaced by a straight bow. The subsequent trial pronounced Hawke to be free from any blame. During the trial, a theory was advanced that the large amount of water displaced by Olympic had generated a suction that had drawn Hawke off course, causing Olympic's voyage to be delayed. The White Star Line also lost on appeal.

=== Sinking ===
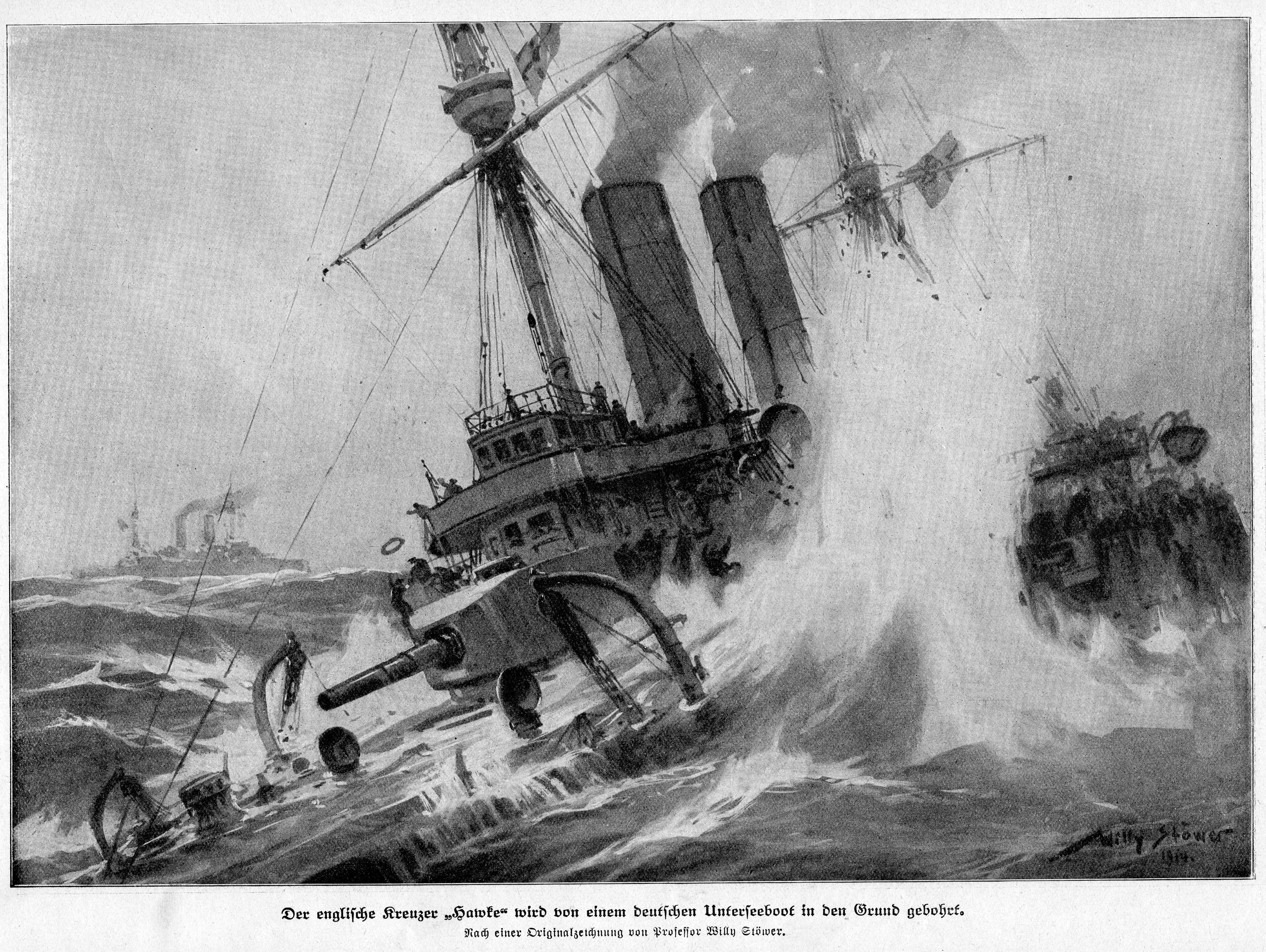
German artistic impression of the sinking by Willy Stoewer 1914

In February 1913, Hawke joined the training squadron based at Queenstown, Ireland, where she served along with most of the rest of the Edgar class. In August 1914, on the outbreak of the First World War, Hawke and the other Edgars from Queenstown, formed the 10th Cruiser Squadron, operating on blockade duties between the Shetland Islands and Norway.

In October 1914, the 10th Cruiser Squadron was deployed further south in the North Sea as part of efforts to stop German warships from attacking a troop convoy from Canada. On 15 October, the squadron was on patrol off Aberdeen, deployed in line abreast at intervals of about 16 km (9.9 mi). Hawke stopped at 9:30 am to pick up mail from sister ship Endymion. After recovering her boat with the mail, Hawke proceeded at 13 knots (24 km/h; 15 mph) without zig-zagging to regain her station, and was out of sight of the rest of the squadron when at 10:30 a single torpedo from the German submarine U-9 (which had sunk three British cruisers on 22 September), struck Hawke, which quickly capsized. The remainder of the squadron realised something was amiss only when, after a further, unsuccessful attack on Theseus, the squadron was ordered to retreat at high speed to the northwest, and no response to the order was received from Hawke. The destroyer Swift was dispatched from Scapa Flow to search for Hawke and found a raft carrying twenty-two men, while a boat with a further forty-nine survivors was rescued by a Norwegian steamer. 524 officers and men died, including the ship's captain, with only 70 survivors (one man died of his wounds on 16 October).

== Wreck ==
On 12 August 2024, deep sea explorer group Lost in Waters Deep announced the discovery of the wreck of Hawke below 360 feet (110 metres) of water about 70 miles (110 km) east of Fraserburgh, Scotland. The location of the wreck was conducted by diving support vessel MV Clasina. One of the divers on the Lost in Waters Deep crew noted that the ship was found "in remarkable condition", with guns, teak wood decks, and "lots of Royal Navy crockery" still in place, noting that a dearth of organic nutrients in the surrounding waters meant that organisms had not been attracted to the area to eat away at the wreck.
