= Passengers of the Titanic =

List of the passengers of RMS Titanic

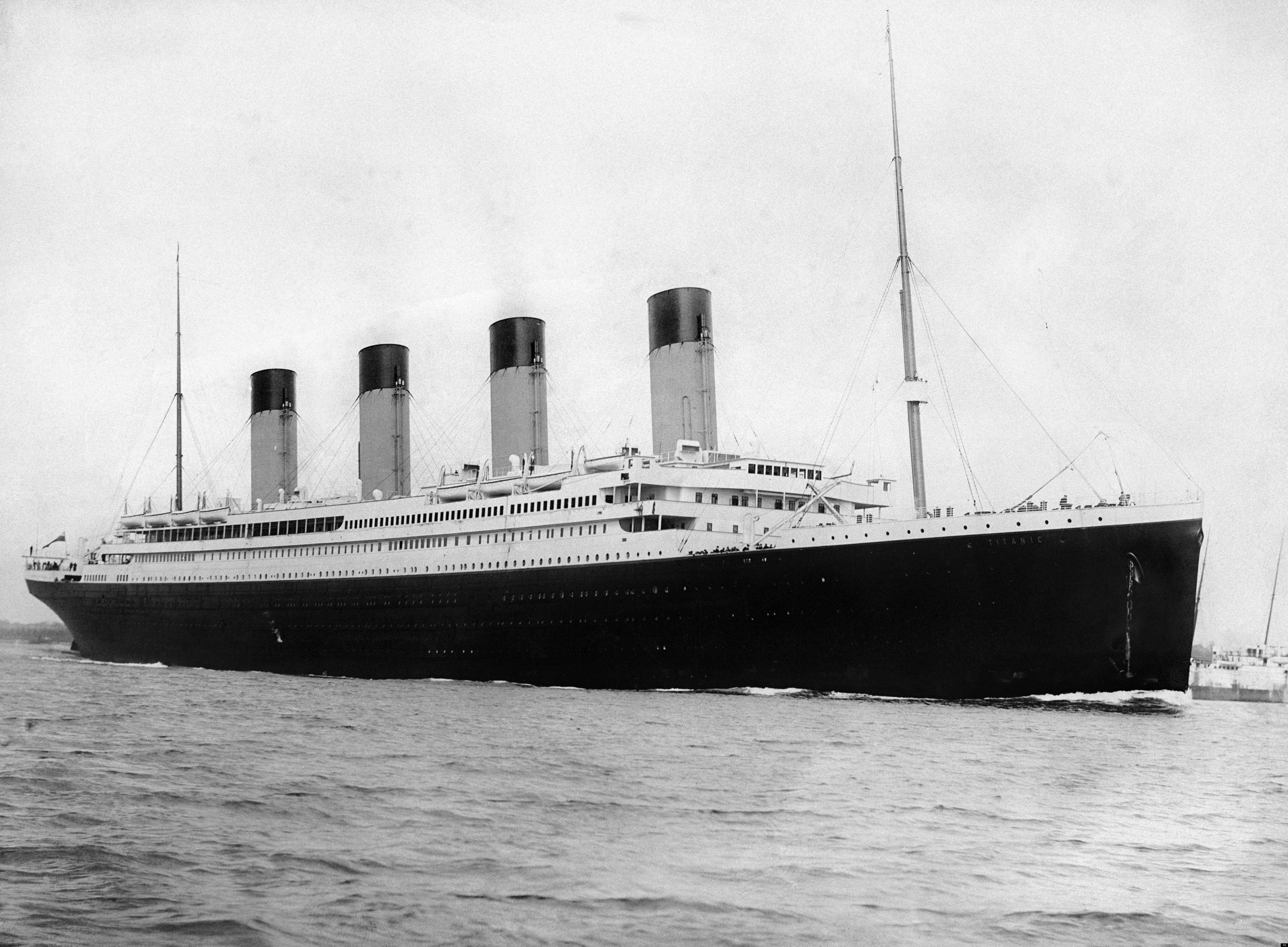
The RMS Titanic departing Southampton, on 10 April 1912 ; five days later, after colliding with an iceberg, it sank in the North Atlantic Ocean

A total of 1,317 people sailed as passengers on the maiden voyage of the RMS Titanic, the second of the White Star Line's Olympic-class ocean liners, from Southampton, England, to New York City. (Note: The total number would be 1,316 if Marius Petersen is excluded as recent research has made his presence on board after the ship left Queenstown doubtful.) Partway through the voyage, the ship struck an iceberg and sank in the early morning of 15 April 1912, resulting in the deaths of 1,496 people, of which around 816 were passengers.

The ship's passengers were separated into three separate classes determined by the price of their ticket: those travelling in first class—most of them the wealthiest passengers on board—including prominent members of the upper class, businessmen, politicians, high-ranking military personnel, industrialists, bankers, entertainers, socialites, and professional athletes. Second-class passengers were predominantly middle-class travelers and included professors, authors, clergymen, and tourists. Third-class or steerage passengers were primarily immigrants moving to the United States and Canada.

== First Class ==
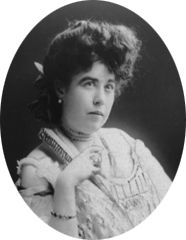
Socialite and activist Margaret Brown who later became known as the "Unsinkable Molly Brown".

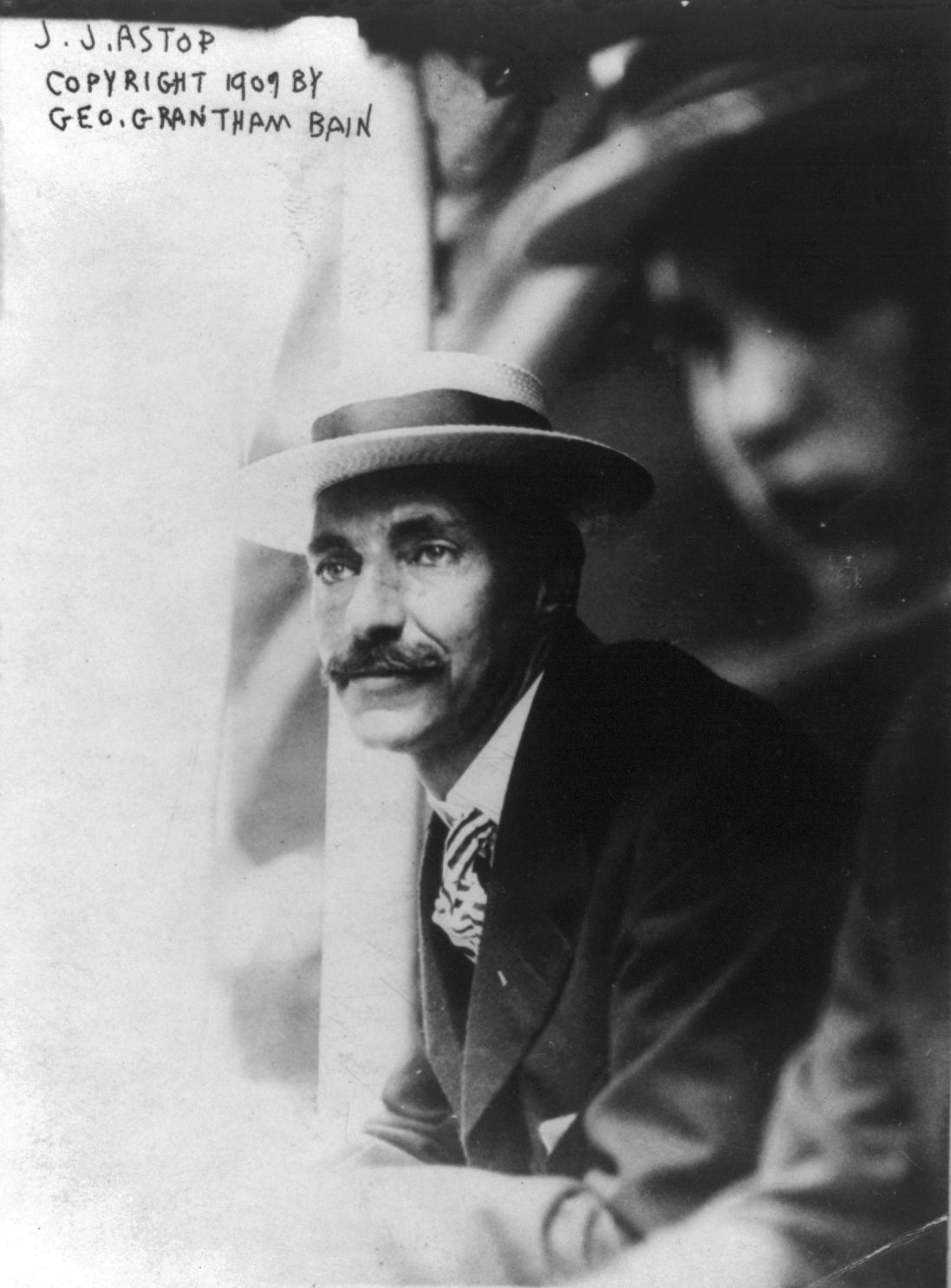
John Jacob Astor IV, the wealthiest person aboard Titanic; he did not survive.

The Countess of Rothes who took charge of the tiller in lifeboat 8.

The Titanic's first-class list was a "who's who" of the prominent upper class in 1912. A single-person berth in first class cost between £30 (equivalent to £3,000 in 2025) and £870 (equivalent to £86,000 in 2025) for a parlour suite and small private promenade deck. First-class passengers enjoyed a number of amenities, including a gymnasium, a squash court, a saltwater swimming pool, electric and Victorian-style Turkish baths, a barbershop, kennels for first-class dogs, elevators, and both open and enclosed promenades. First-class passengers also traveled accompanied by personal staff—valets, maids, nurses and governesses for the children, chauffeurs, and cooks.

Many members of the British aristocracy made the trip: the Countess of Rothes, wife of the 19th Earl of Rothes, embarked at Southampton with her parents, Thomas and Clementina Dyer-Edwardes, and cousin Gladys Cherry. Sir Cosmo Duff-Gordon and his wife, fashion designer Lucy, Lady Duff-Gordon were aboard, travelling under the alias of "Mr. and Mrs. Morgan". Colonel Archibald Gracie IV, a real estate investor and member of the wealthy Gracie family, embarked at Southampton. White Star Line's managing director J. Bruce Ismay and the ship's Harland and Wolff designer, Thomas Andrews, were both on board to oversee the ship's progress on her maiden voyage.

Some of the most prominent members of the American social elite made the trip: 47-year-old real estate builder, businessman, and multimillionaire Colonel John Jacob Astor IV and his 18-year-old pregnant wife Madeleine were returning to the United States for their child's birth. Astor was the wealthiest passenger aboard the ship and one of the richest men in the world. Among others were industrialist magnate and millionaire Benjamin Guggenheim; Macy's department store owner, and former member of the United States House of Representatives Isidor Straus, and his wife Ida; George Dennick Wick, founder and president of Youngstown Sheet and Tube Company; millionaire streetcar magnate George Dunton Widener and his wife Eleanor; John B. Thayer, vice president of Pennsylvania Railroad, and his wife, Marian; Charles Hays, president of Canada's Grand Trunk Railway; William Ernest Carter and his wife, American socialite Lucile Carter; millionaire, philanthropist and women's rights activist Margaret Brown; theatre manager and producer Henry B. Harris and his wife (and future theatre manager) Renee Harris; famous American silent film actress Dorothy Gibson; prominent Buffalo architect Edward Austin Kent; and President William Howard Taft's military aide, Major Archibald Butt, who was returning to resume his duties after a six-week trip to Europe. Swedish first class passenger and businessman Mauritz Björnström-Steffansson owned the most highly valued single object on board: a masterpiece of French neoclassical painting entitled La Circassienne au Bain, for which he would later claim US$100,000 in compensation (equivalent to US$3.3 million in 2025).

== Second Class ==
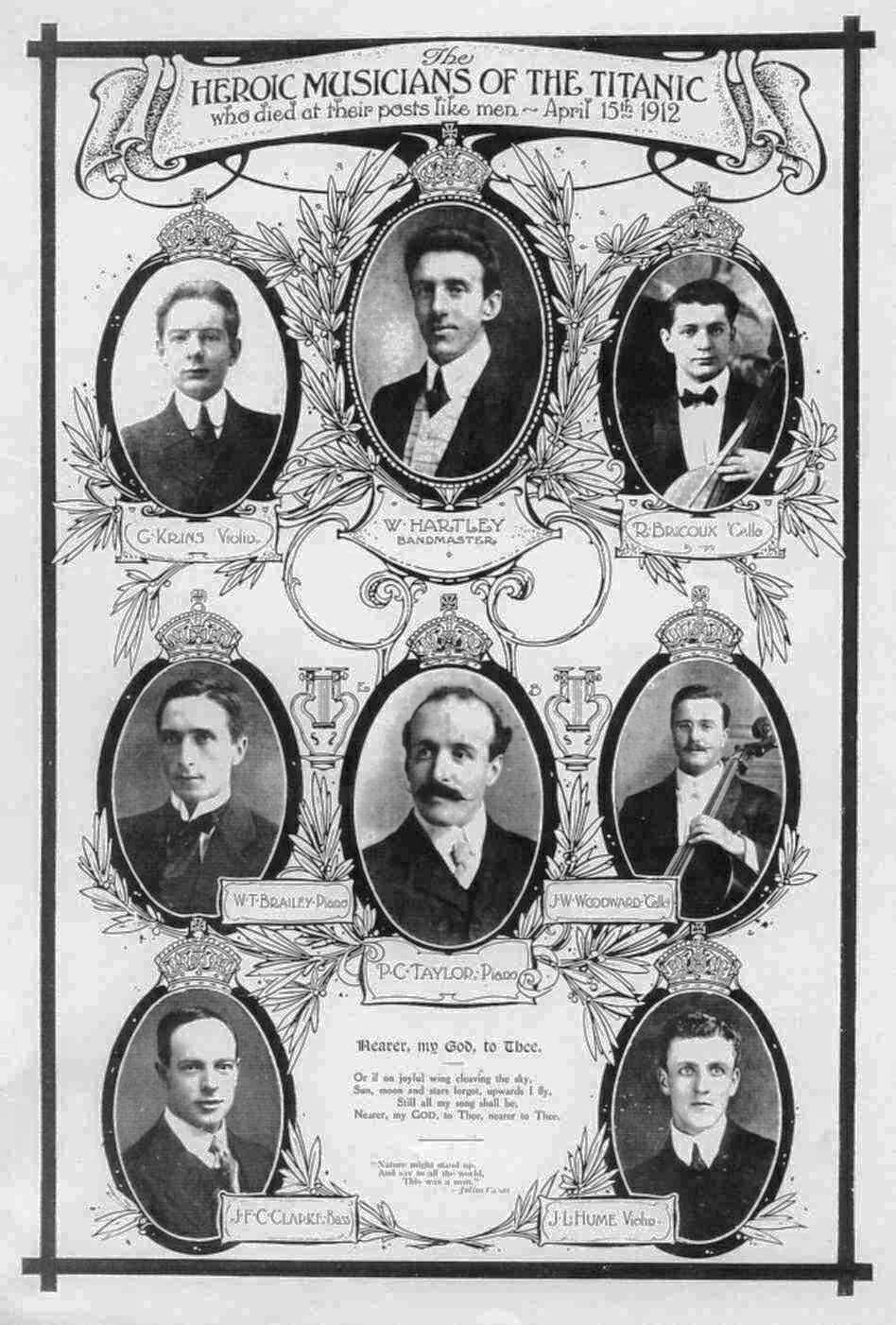
The Titanic' instrumental musicians, led by Wallace Hartley, were employed as crew, but given second-class accommodations.

Second-class passengers were leisure tourists, academics, members of the clergy, and middle-class British and American families. The ship's musicians traveled in second-class accommodations; they were not counted as members of the crew, but were employed by an agency under contract to the White Star Line. The average ticket price for an adult second-class passenger was £13 (equivalent to £1,300 in 2025). and for many of these passengers, their travel experience on the Titanic was akin to travelling first class on smaller liners. Second-class passengers had their own library and the men had access to a private smoking room. Second-class children could read the children's books provided in the library or play deck quoits and shuffleboard on the second-class promenade. Twelve-year-old Ruth Becker passed the time by pushing her two-year-old brother Richard around the enclosed promenade in a stroller provided by the White Star Line.

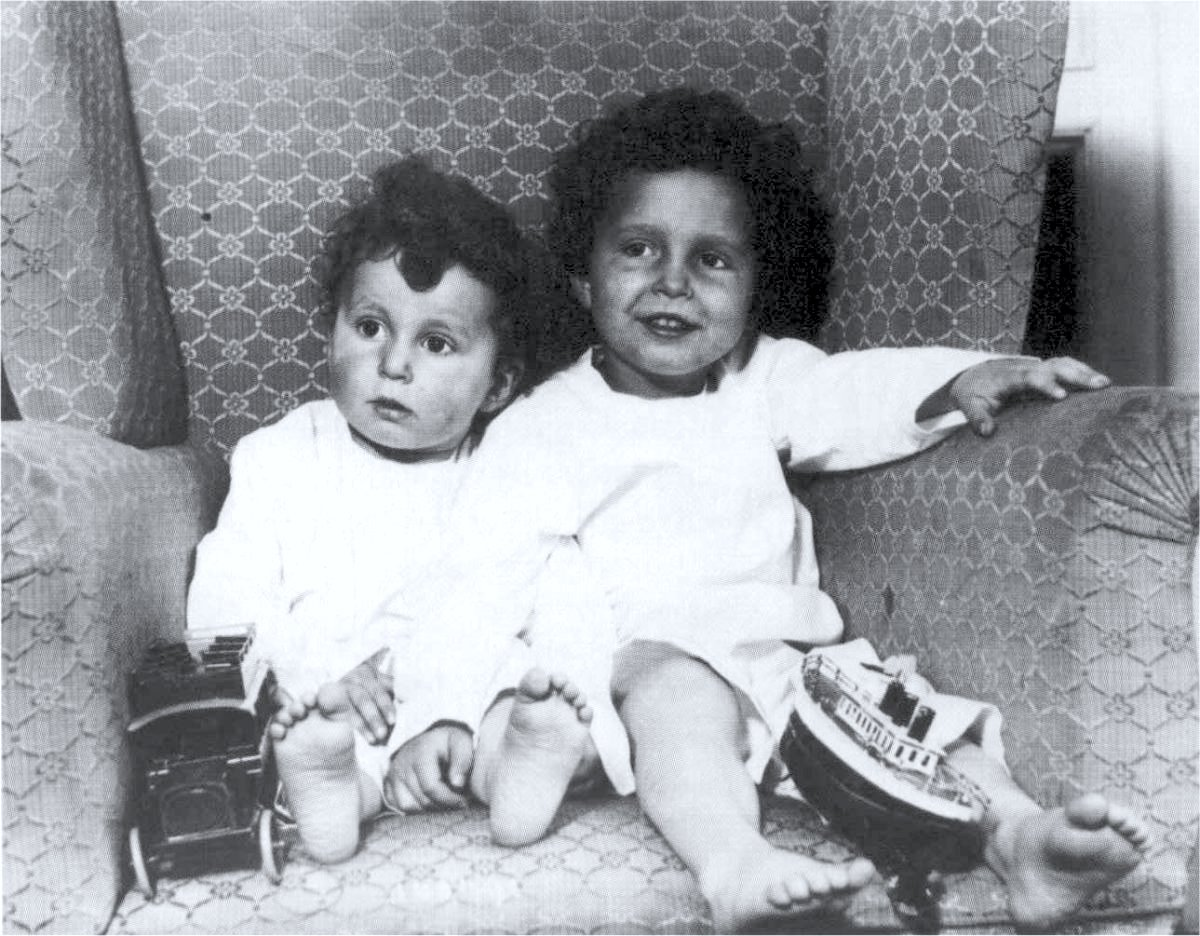
Michel (right) and Edmond Navratil, the "Titanic Orphans"

Two Roman Catholic priests on board, Father Thomas Byles and Father Joseph Peruschitz, celebrated mass every day for second- and third-class passengers during the voyage. Father Byles gave his homilies in English, Irish, and French and Father Peruschitz gave his in German and Hungarian. Father Byles reportedly perished in the sinking, performing blessings and last rites for those trapped.

On the ship, a Lithuanian priest, Father Juozas Montvila, also perished during the sinking.

Rev. John Harper, a well-known Baptist pastor from Scotland, was travelling to the United States with his daughter and sister to preach at the Moody Church in Chicago.

Schoolteacher Lawrence Beesley, a science master at Dulwich College, spent much of his time aboard the ship in the library. Two months after the sinking, he wrote and published The Loss of the SS Titanic, the first eyewitness account of the disaster.

The Laroche family, father Joseph and daughters Simone and Louise, were the only known passengers of black ancestry on board the ship. They, along with Joseph's pregnant wife Juliette, were travelling to Joseph's native island of Haiti. Joseph hoped that a move from their former home in Paris back to Haiti, where his uncle Cincinnatus Leconte was president, would take his family away from racial discrimination.

Another French family travelling in second class was the Navratils, travelling under the assumed name Hoffman. Michel Navratil, a Slovak-born French tailor, had kidnapped his two young sons, Michel Jr. and Edmond from his estranged wife, assumed the name Charles Hoffman, and boarded the ship in Southampton, intent on taking his children to the United States. Michel Sr. died in the sinking and photographs of the boys were circulated throughout the world in the hopes that their mother or another relative could identify the French toddlers, who became known as the "Titanic Orphans". After arriving in New York, the children were cared for by Titanic survivor Margaret Hays until their mother, Marcelle Navratil traveled from Nice, France, to claim them. The last living second-class survivor was Barbara West; she was 10 months old at the time of sinking and died in 2007 at the age of 96.

== Third Class ==
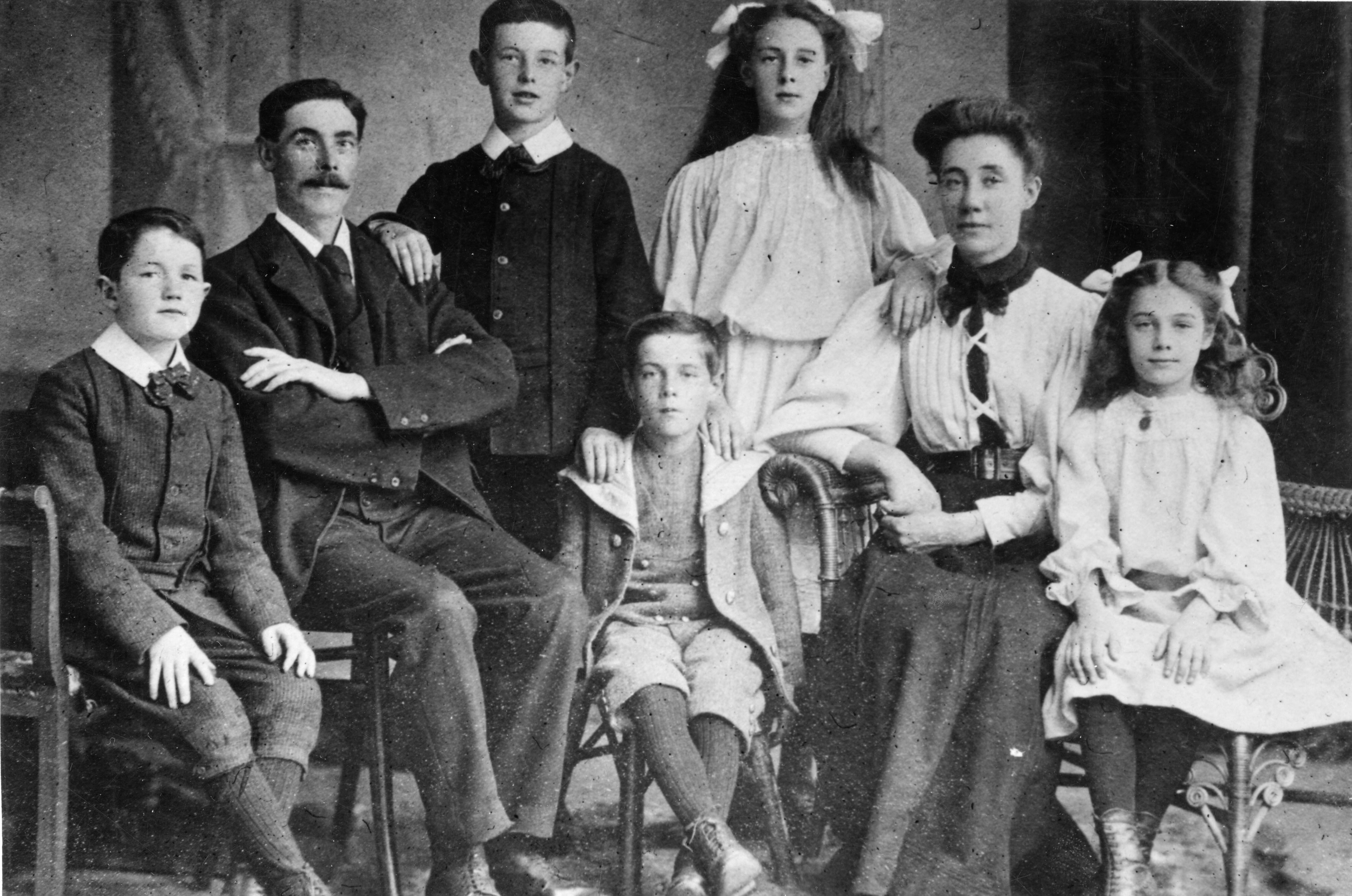
The Goodwins and five of their six children: William, Frederick, Charles, Harold, Lillian, Augusta, and Jessie

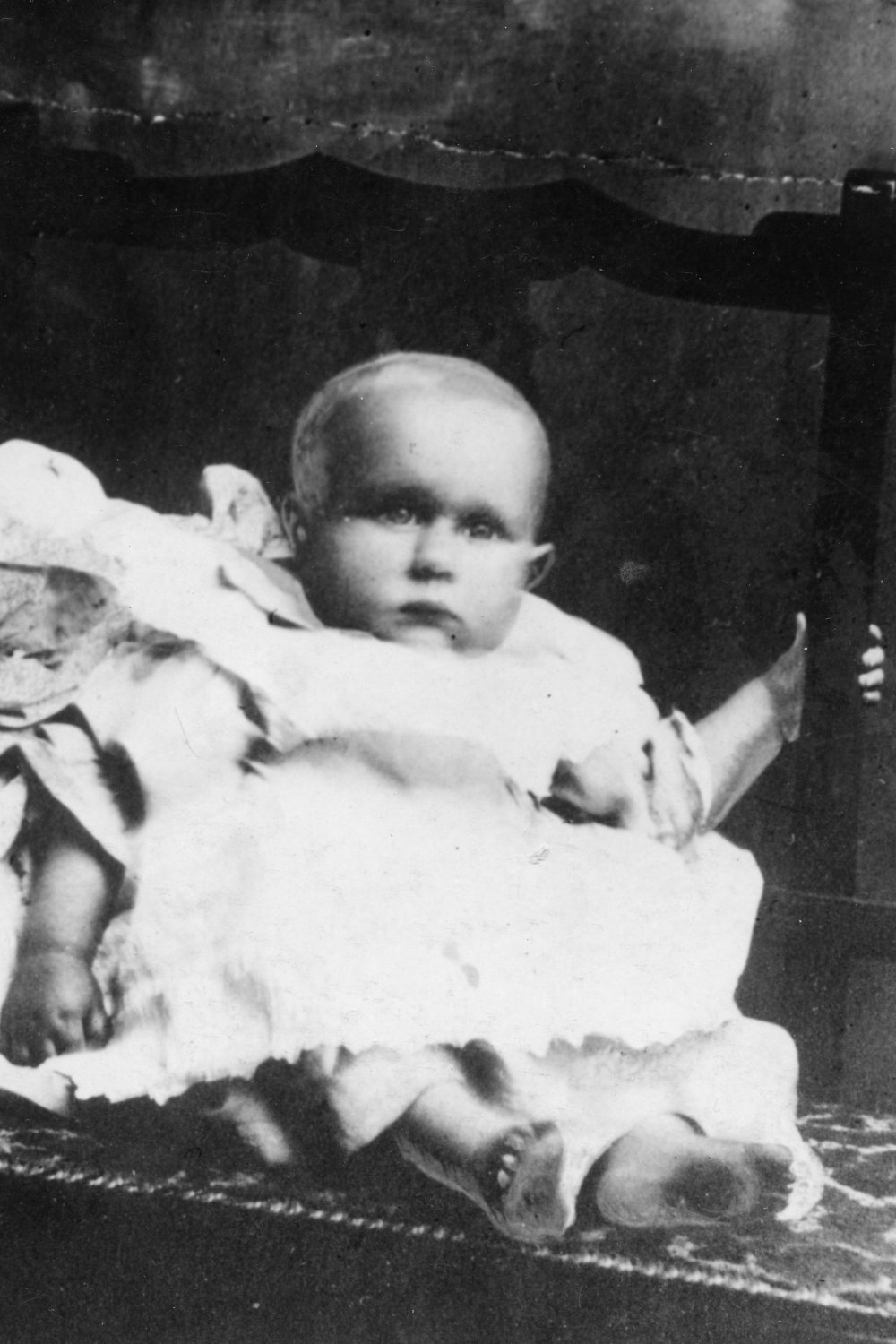
The youngest Goodwin, Sidney

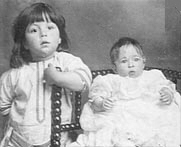
Siblings Bertram and Millvina Dean, both third class passengers. Millvina was the youngest passenger aboard.

The third-class passengers or steerage passengers left hoping to start new lives in the United States and Canada. Third-class passengers paid £7 (equivalent to £700 in 2025) for their ticket, depending on their place of origin; ticket prices often included the price of rail travel to the three departure ports. Tickets for children cost £3 (equivalent to £300 in 2025).

Some traveled alone or in small family groups. Several groups of mothers were travelling alone with their young children, including the Lefebvres, the Pålssons, and the Panulas. Most were going to join their husbands, who had already gone to America to find jobs, and having saved enough money, could now send for their families.

Among the larger third-class families were John and Annie Sage, who were immigrating to Jacksonville, Florida, with their 9 children, ranging in age from 4 to 20 years; Anders and Alfrida Andersson of Sweden and their five children, who were travelling to Canada along with Alfrida's younger sister Anna, husband Ernst, and baby Gilbert; and Frederick and Augusta Goodwin, who were moving with their six children to his new job at a power plant in New York. In 2007, scientists using DNA analysis identified the body of a small, fair-haired toddler, one of the first victims to be recovered by the CS Mackay-Bennett, as Frederick and Augusta's youngest child, 19-month-old Sidney. The Sages, Anderssons and Goodwins all perished in the sinking.

The youngest passenger on board the ship, 2-month-old Millvina Dean, who with her parents Bertram Sr. and Eva Dean and older brother Bertram, was emigrating from England to Kansas, died in 2009. She was the last survivor of the Titanic disaster to die.

To compete with rival shipping company Cunard, the White Star Line offered their steerage passengers modest luxuries, in the hopes that emigrants would write to relatives back home and encourage them to travel on White Star Line ships. Third-class passengers had their own dining facilities, with chairs instead of benches, and meals prepared by the third-class kitchen staff. On other liners, the steerage-passengers would have been expected to bring their own food.

Rather than dormitory-style sleeping areas, third-class passengers had their own cabins. The single men and women were separated, women in the stern in two to six berth cabins, men in the bow in up to 10 berth cabins, often shared with strangers. Each stateroom was fitted with wood panelling and beds with mattresses, blankets, pillows, electric lights, heat, and a washbasin with running water, except for the bow cabins, which did not have a private washbasin. Two public bathtubs were also provided, one for the men, the other for women.

Passengers gathered in the third-class common room, where they could play chess or cards, or walk along the poop deck. Third-class children played in the common room or explored the ship. Nine-year-old Frank Goldsmith recalled peering into the engine room and climbing up the baggage cranes on the poop deck.

== Ticket-holders who did not sail ==
Numerous notable and prominent people of the era, who held tickets for the westbound passage or were guests of those who held tickets, did not sail. Others were waiting in New York to board for the passage back to Plymouth, England, on the second leg of Titanic's maiden voyage. Many of the unused tickets that survived, whether they were for the westbound passage or the return eastbound passage, have become quite valuable as Titanic-related artifacts.

Milton S. Hershey, founder of Hershey's chocolate, made plans to sail aboard the ship's maiden voyage, but cancelled his booking before the ship set sail in order to go back earlier for business reasons; he travelled back earlier on the SS Amerika. Guglielmo Marconi, the inventor of wireless telegraphy which would play a large role in the rescue of survivors, ended up leaving on the RMS Lusitania for urgent business in New York and would have been aboard the voyage back to England. Financier J. P. Morgan was also reported to have been planning to make the voyage but changed his plans. George Washington Vanderbilt II and his wife Edith ended up booking an earlier voyage aboard RMS Olympic; his servant Edwin Wheeler was sent to travel with their luggage on Titanic and was subsequently lost in the sinking.

Other notables include: novelist Theodore Dreiser – who ended up travelling on the SS Kroonland – Pittsburgh steel baron Henry Clay Frick, and evangelist John Mott.

== Passengers by ethnicity ==
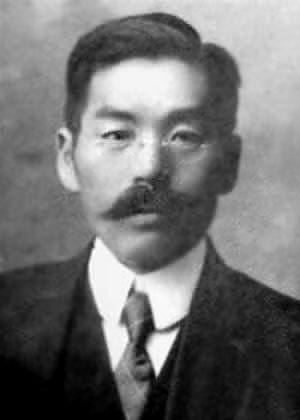
Masabumi Hosono, a second-class passenger and the only Japanese passenger aboard.

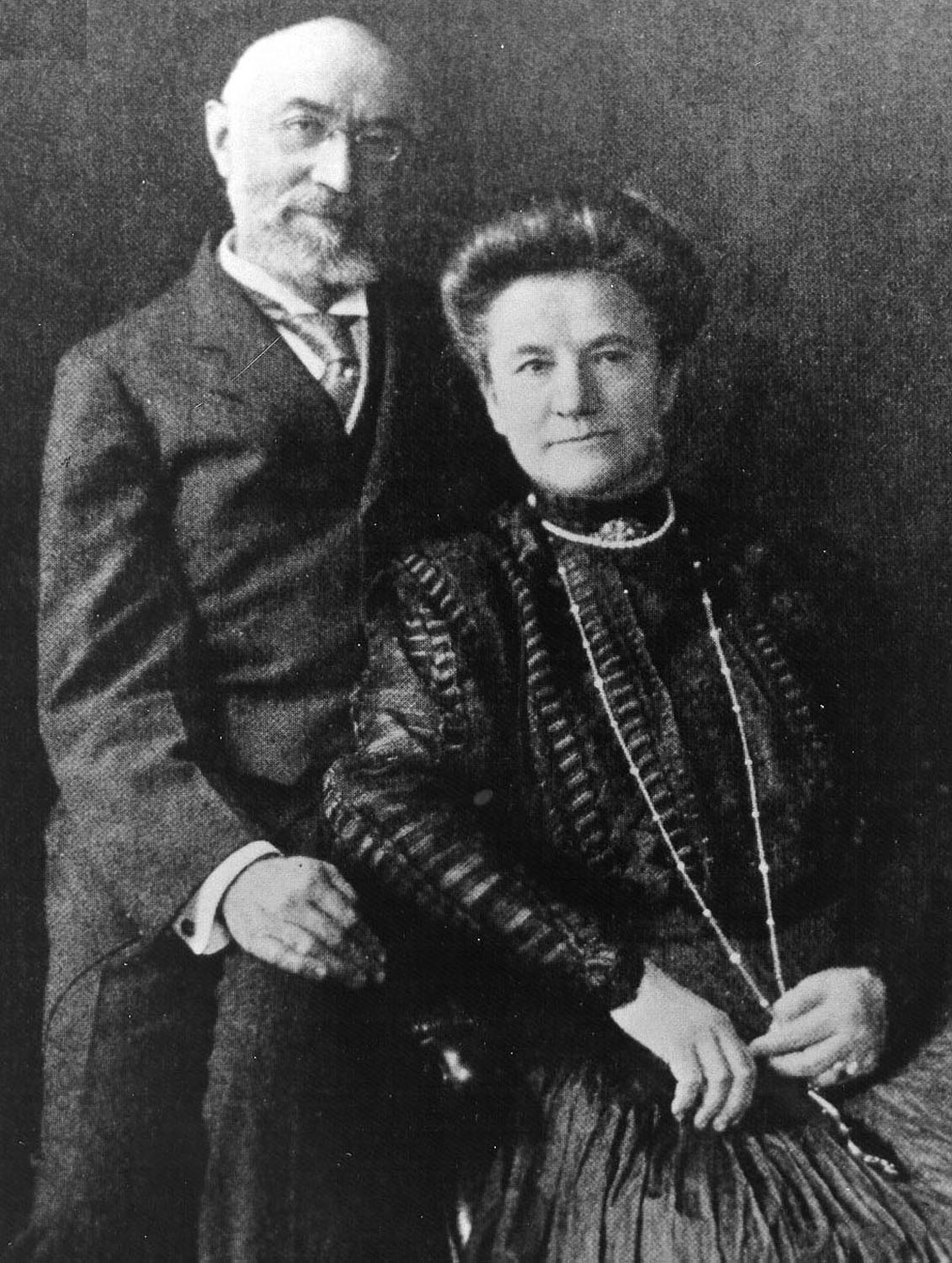
Isidor and Ida Straus, Jewish first class passengers

Aboard Titanic, the complement of passengers were representative of several nationalities and ethnicities, across all classes. In particular, third class were a diverse group. In addition to British and Irish immigrants, amongst them were also: Bulgarians, Croatians, Greek, Portuguese, and Scandinavian passengers. Many of them were either immigrating or coming back from visiting family in their ancestral countries.

Also notable amongst passengers were Jews, who were represented in all classes, but mostly as immigrants from Central and Eastern Europe. A sizable group of passengers came from the Ottoman Empire, from diverse backgrounds. A small group of Chinese passengers, from Hong Kong, were also aboard; most of them were sailors who were travelling to America to join their ship. There was also a Haitian passenger, his French wife, and their two daughters. Included amongst the diverse group were also passengers from Central and South America and also one Japanese passenger.

=== Black passengers ===
The Laroche family were second class passengers. father Joseph Philippe Lemercier Laroche and daughters Simone and Louise, were the only known passengers of Black ancestry on board the ship. They, along with Joseph's pregnant wife Juliette, were travelling to Joseph's native island of Haiti. Joseph hoped that a move from their former home in Paris back to Haiti, where his uncle Cincinnatus Leconte was president, would take his family away from racial discrimination.

=== Chinese passengers ===
Eight passengers are listed on the passenger list with a home country of China, from the hometown of Hong Kong, with a destination of New York. Six of these men survived the disaster. After their rescue, the six survivors disembarked from the Carpathia on Ellis Island and joined the Donald Line ship Annetta. (Note: The documentary The Six made the inference that the seamen were prevented from leaving the Carpathia in compliance with the Chinese Exclusion Act but it is unclear whether this was really the case as they were sailors with the Donaldson Line and had intended to join the Annetta all along.) One of the Chinese survivors, Fang Lang (real name Wing Sun Fong), was one of the four men whom Fifth Officer Harold Lowe rescued from the water after returning in Lifeboat 14 to search for any survivors still stranded in the sea. Fong eventually settled in the US, and fellow survivor Lee Bing moved to Canada, settling in Galt, Ontario. The stories of the Chinese survivors, which were mostly overlooked for over a century, were presented in a 2021 documentary film, The Six, after researchers worked to piece together their whereabouts and lives after the sinking. A book complementing the documentary was published in 2025.

=== Jewish passengers ===
There were at least 69 known Jewish passengers aboard the Titanic, though the number is likely to be much higher. Of those 69 confirmed, 39 perished in the sinking. At least one crew member was Jewish: Second class barber Herbert Klein, who did not survive. It is known that the White Star Line provided a kosher menu for Jewish passengers and also provided utensils marked in both English and Hebrew.

Jewish passengers were in every class and represented a variety of nationalities, including Poland, England, the United States and the Russian Empire. Notable Jewish passengers include Eva Hart and her parents Esther and Benjamin in second class; Ida and Isidor Straus, founder of Macy's store and his wife; Benjamin Guggenheim, one of the richest men in the world at the time; Herman Klaber, founder of Klaber Hop Fields; journalist Edith Rosenbaum; and Broadway producer Renee Harris. Most Jewish passengers, however, were in the third class, the majority of whom were immigrating to the United States, escaping prosecution from Eastern Europe.

=== Ottoman passengers ===
There were more than 80 passengers from the Ottoman Empire, including Turkish, Armenian and Levantine backgrounds. At the time, many carried identification from the Ottoman Empire that stated they were from the region of Syria, (Note: See also Ottoman Syria) which included Palestine, Jordan, Lebanon, and Syria.

According to Bakhos Assaf, mayor of Hardine, Lebanon, 93 passengers originated from what is today Lebanon, with 20 of them from Hardine, the highest number of any Lebanese location. Of the Hardine passengers, 11 adult men died, while eight women and children and one adult man survived. Kamal Seikaly, an individual quoted in an article from the Lebanese publication The Daily Star, stated that according to a 16 May 1912, issue of the Al-Khawater magazine stored in the American University of Beirut, of the 125 Lebanese aboard, 23 survived. The magazine states that 10 people from Kfar Meshki died on the Titanic. According to author Judith Geller, "officially [there] were 154 Syrians on board the Titanic and 29 were saved: four men, five children, and 20 women".

In 1997, Ray Hanania, a Palestinian American journalist, watched the Titanic (1997) film and noticed some background characters saying yalla, meaning "hurry" in Arabic. This prompted him to research the issue and he discovered that Arab passengers were on board. In 1998, he wrote a column about the Arabs on the Titanic, "Titanic: We Share the Pain But Not the Glory." According to Hanania's analysis, 79 Arab passengers were on board the ship, though the task to "identify precisely" which passengers were Arab is difficult. Hanania stated that many were Christians because church sponsorship made getting passage easier for Christians as opposed to Muslims, and Christians were more likely to emigrate due to persecution by the Ottoman regime. An in-depth study was made by Leila Salloum Elias about the lives of Syrian, as well as Armenian passengers aboard the ship, using volumes of research taken from Arabic newspapers contemporary to the sinking to clarify the names and circumstances of many Syrian passengers. The total number of Syrian passengers, according to Syrian survivors was between 145 and 165, of these, only one couple who boarded as second-class passengers. Salloum's passenger count is based on the contemporary sources of the sinking in which names are clarified and given based on their true and authentic Arabic names, families and village, town or city of origin.

== Survivors and victims ==
On the night of 14 April 1912, around 11:40 pm, while the Titanic was sailing about 400 mi (640 km) south of the Grand Banks of Newfoundland, the ship struck an iceberg and began to sink. Shortly before midnight, Captain Edward Smith ordered the ship's lifeboats to be readied and a distress call was sent out. The closest ship to respond was Cunard Line's Carpathia 58 mi (93 km) away, which would arrive in an estimated 4 hours—too late to rescue all of Titanic's passengers. Forty-five minutes after the ship hit the iceberg, Captain Smith ordered the lifeboats to be loaded and lowered under the orders women and children first.

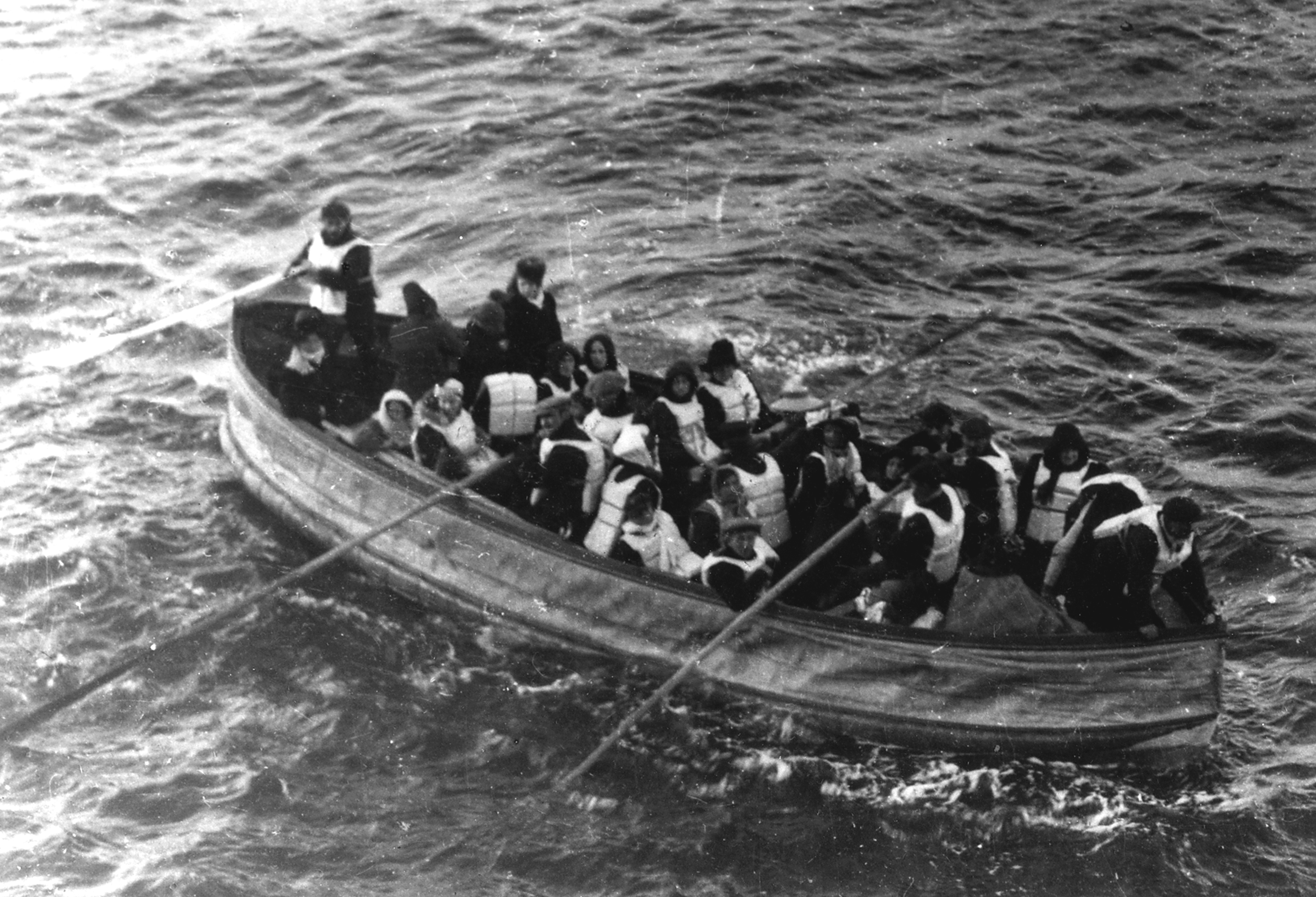
Titanic lifeboat D, taken from the Carpathia

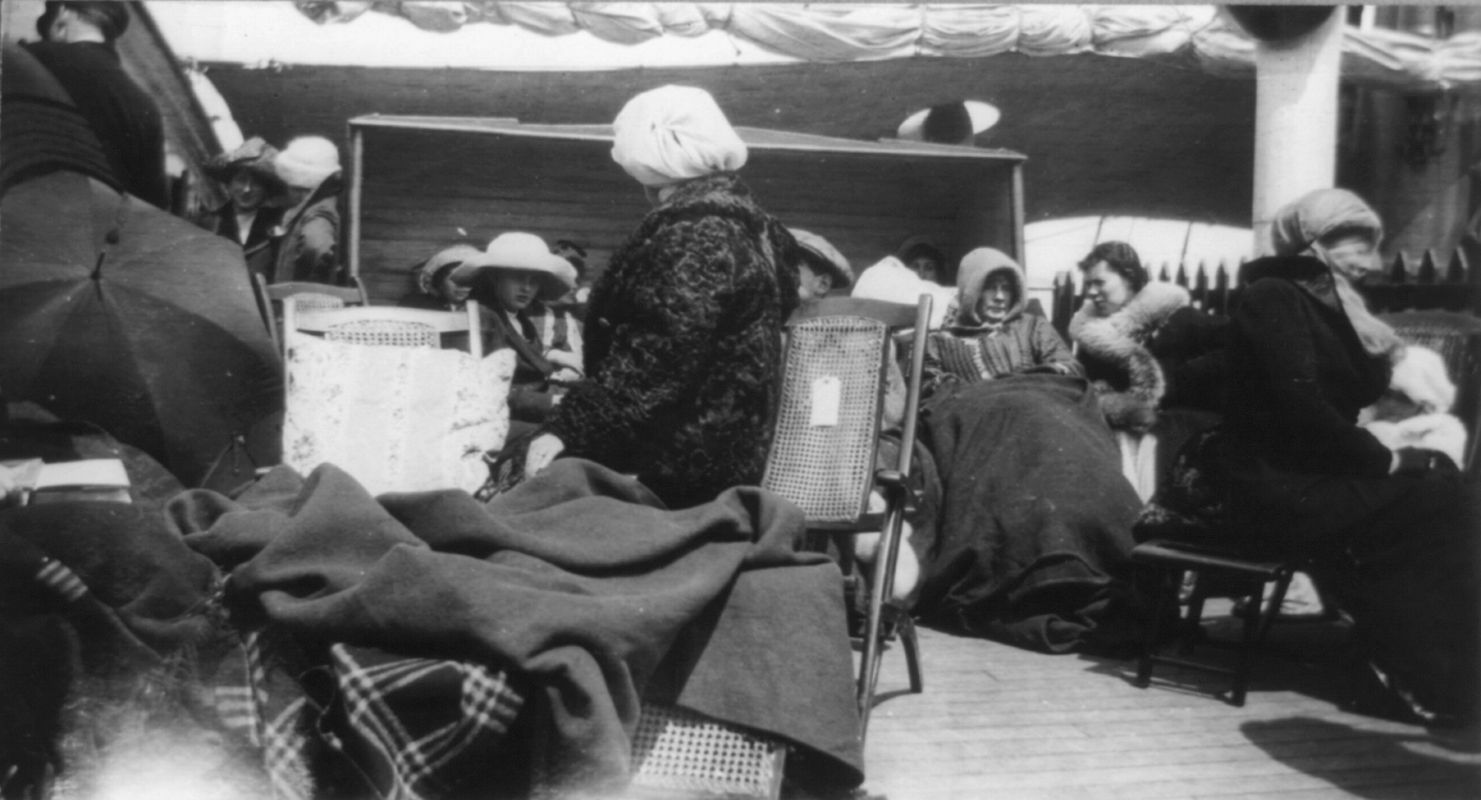
Titanic survivors on board Carpathia

The first lifeboat launched was Lifeboat 7 on the starboard side. It was lowered around 12:45 am as believed by the British Inquiry. Collapsible Boat D was the last lifeboat to be launched, at 1:55. Two more lifeboats, Collapsibles Boat A and Boat B, were in the process of being removed from their location on the roof of the officer's house, but could not be properly launched. Collapsible B floated away from the ship upside down, while Collapsible A became half-filled with water after the supports for its canvas sides were broken in the fall from the roof of the officers' quarters.

Arguments occurred in some of the lifeboats about going back to pick up people in the water, but many survivors were afraid of being swamped by people trying to climb into the lifeboat or being pulled down by the suction from the sinking Titanic, and discouraged those in charge of the boats from returning to the wrecksite. At 2:20 am, Titanic herself sank. Fifth Officer Harold Lowe, after transferring passengers in Lifeboat 14 to other nearby lifeboats, did return to the wrecksite and managed to pull out four survivors, one of whom died soon after. Another lifeboat, No. 4, was close enough to the sinking ship to pick up a few swimmers in the water before pulling away.

After the ship sank, a small number of passengers and crew who had still been aboard were able to make their way to the two unlaunched collapsible boats, some of them surviving until daybreak. The survivors of Boat A, numbering around 12, were rescued by Fifth Officer Lowe who spotted the boat after finishing Lifeboat 14's search of the wrecksite, while Second Officer Charles Lightoller, on Boat B, used his officer's whistle to attract the attention of nearby Lifeboats 4 and 12 who rowed over and took of the survivors, numbering around 24, of the overturned collapsible.

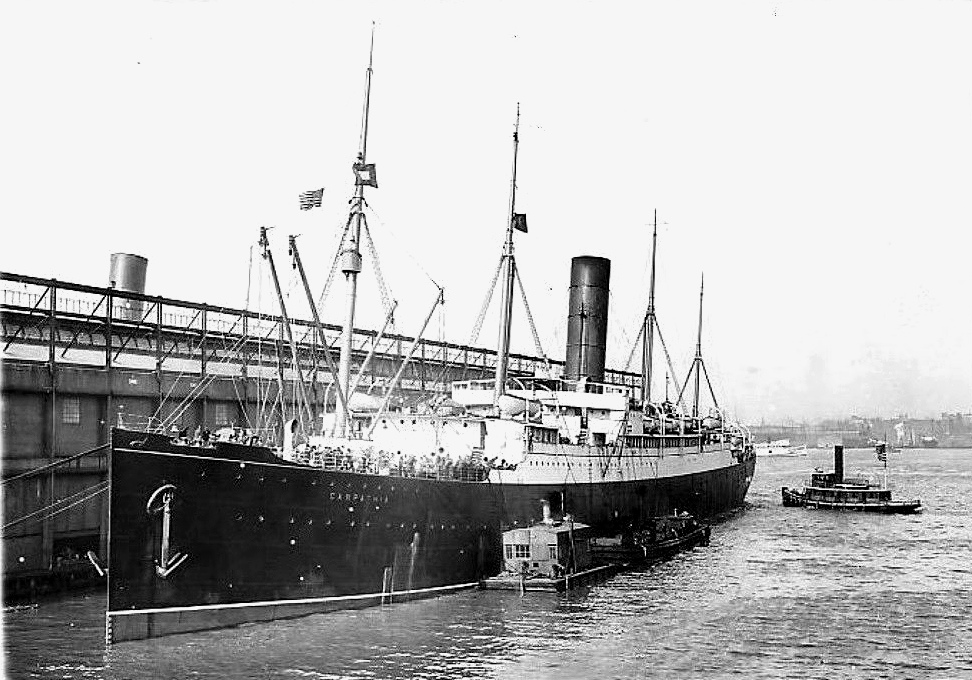
Carpathia arriving at Pier 54 with Titanic survivors

At 4:10 am, Carpathia arrived at the site of the sinking and began rescuing survivors. By 8:30 am, she picked up the last lifeboat with survivors and left the area at 08:50 bound for Pier 54 in New York City. Of the 712 passengers and crew rescued by the Carpathia, six, including first-class passenger William F. Hoyt, either died in a lifeboat during the night or on board the Carpathia the next morning, and were buried at sea.

=== Recovery of bodies ===
In the days following the sinking, several ships sailed to the disaster area to recover victims' bodies. The White Star Line chartered the cable ship CS Mackay-Bennett from Halifax, Nova Scotia, to retrieve bodies. Three other ships followed in the search: the cable ship CS Minia, the lighthouse supply ship Montmagny, and the sealing vessel Algerine. Each ship left with embalming supplies, undertakers, and clergy. Upon recovery, each body retrieved by the Mackay-Bennett was numbered and given as detailed a description as possible to help aid in identification. The physical appearance of each body—height, weight, age, hair and eye colour, visible birthmarks, scars or tattoos, was catalogued and any personal effects on the bodies were gathered and placed in small canvas bags corresponding to their number.

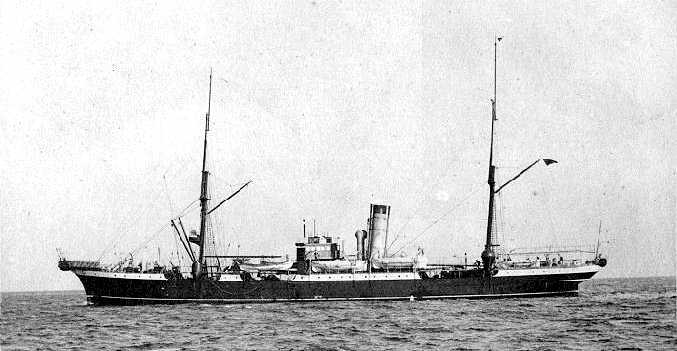
CS Mackay-Bennett, the first ship to arrive at the Titanic wreck site in search for bodies

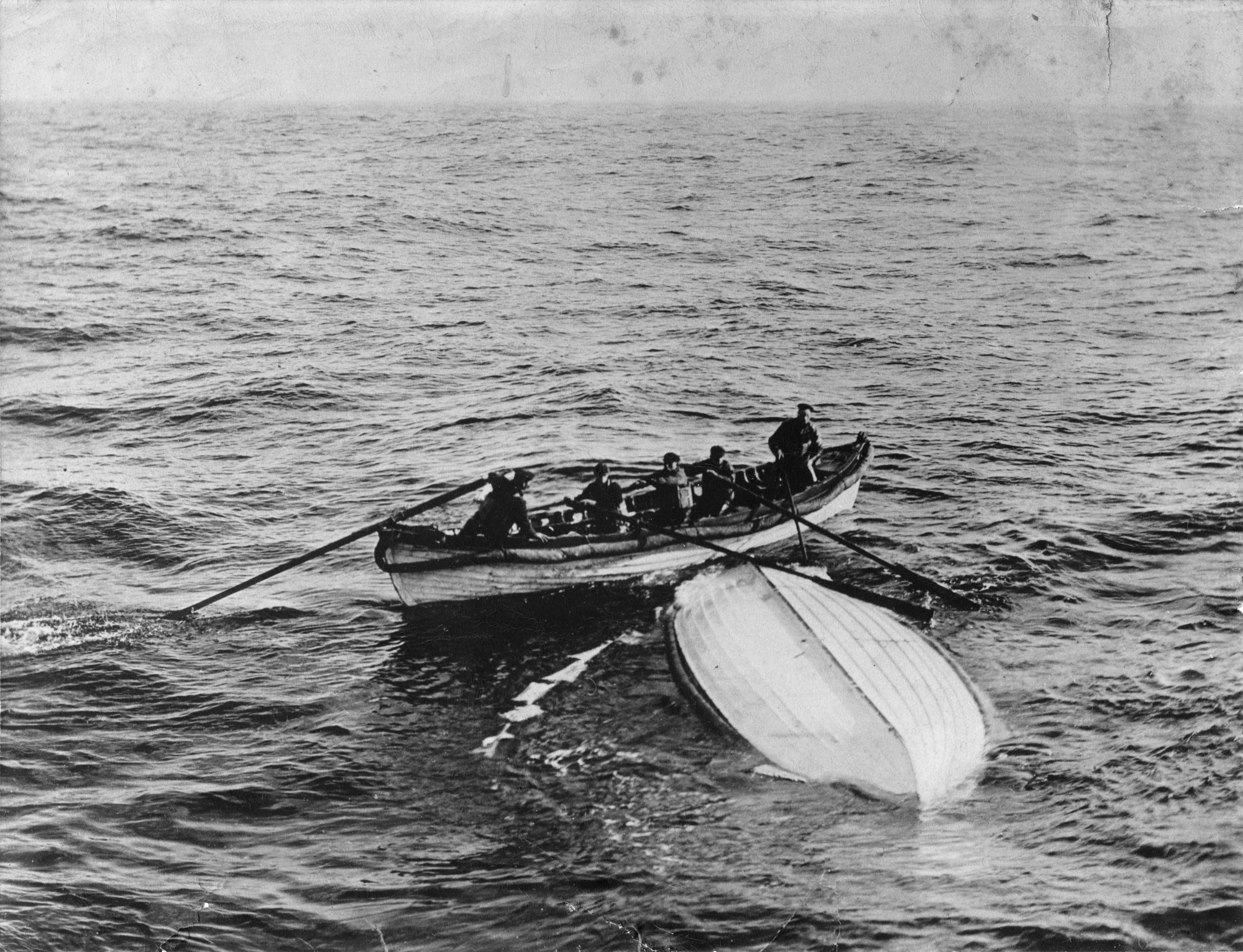
Crew of the Mackay-Bennett coming across Collapsible Boat B

The ship found such a large number of bodies – 306 – that the embalming supplies aboard were quickly exhausted. Health regulations permitted that only embalmed bodies could be returned to port. Captain Larnder of the Mackay-Bennett and the undertakers aboard decided to preserve all bodies of first-class passengers because of the need to visually identify wealthy men to resolve any disputes over large estates. As a result, the majority of the 116 burials at sea were third-class passengers and crew (only 56 were identified). Larnder himself claimed that as a mariner, he would expect to be buried at sea. However, complaints about the burials at sea were made by families and undertakers. Later ships such as Minia found fewer bodies, requiring fewer embalming supplies, and were able to limit burials at sea to bodies that were too damaged to preserve.

190 bodies recovered were preserved and taken to Halifax, Nova Scotia, the closest city to the sinking with direct rail and steamship connections. A large temporary morgue was set up in a curling rink, and undertakers were called in from all across Eastern Canada to assist. Relatives from across North America came to identify and claim the bodies of their relatives. Some bodies were shipped to be buried in their home towns across North America and Europe. About two-thirds of the bodies were identified. Of the remaining 150 unclaimed bodies, 121 were taken to the non-denominational Fairview Lawn Cemetery; 19 were buried in the Roman Catholic Mount Olivet Cemetery, and 10 were taken to the Jewish Baron de Hirsch Cemetery. Unidentified victims were buried with simple numbers based on the order in which their bodies were discovered.

In mid-May 1912, over 200 mi (320 km) from the site of the sinking, RMS Oceanic recovered three bodies, numbers 331, 332, and 333, who were occupants of Collapsible A, which was swamped in the last moments of the sinking. Although numerous people managed to reach this lifeboat, several died during the night from hypothermia and, in most cases, their bodies pushed off to keep the boat afloat. When Fifth Officer Lowe and the crew of Lifeboat 14 returned to pick up survivors, they rescued surviving passengers from Collapsible A, but Lowe decided to leave the three dead bodies in the boat, covering them up with lifebelts. Only one of the bodies, that of first-class passenger Thomson Beattie, was identified. The other two were determined to be unidentified crew members. After their retrieval of Collapsible A, the crew of the Oceanic buried the decomposed bodies at sea.

== Passenger list ==
Breakdown of casualties according to the British Board of Trade report (click for detail)

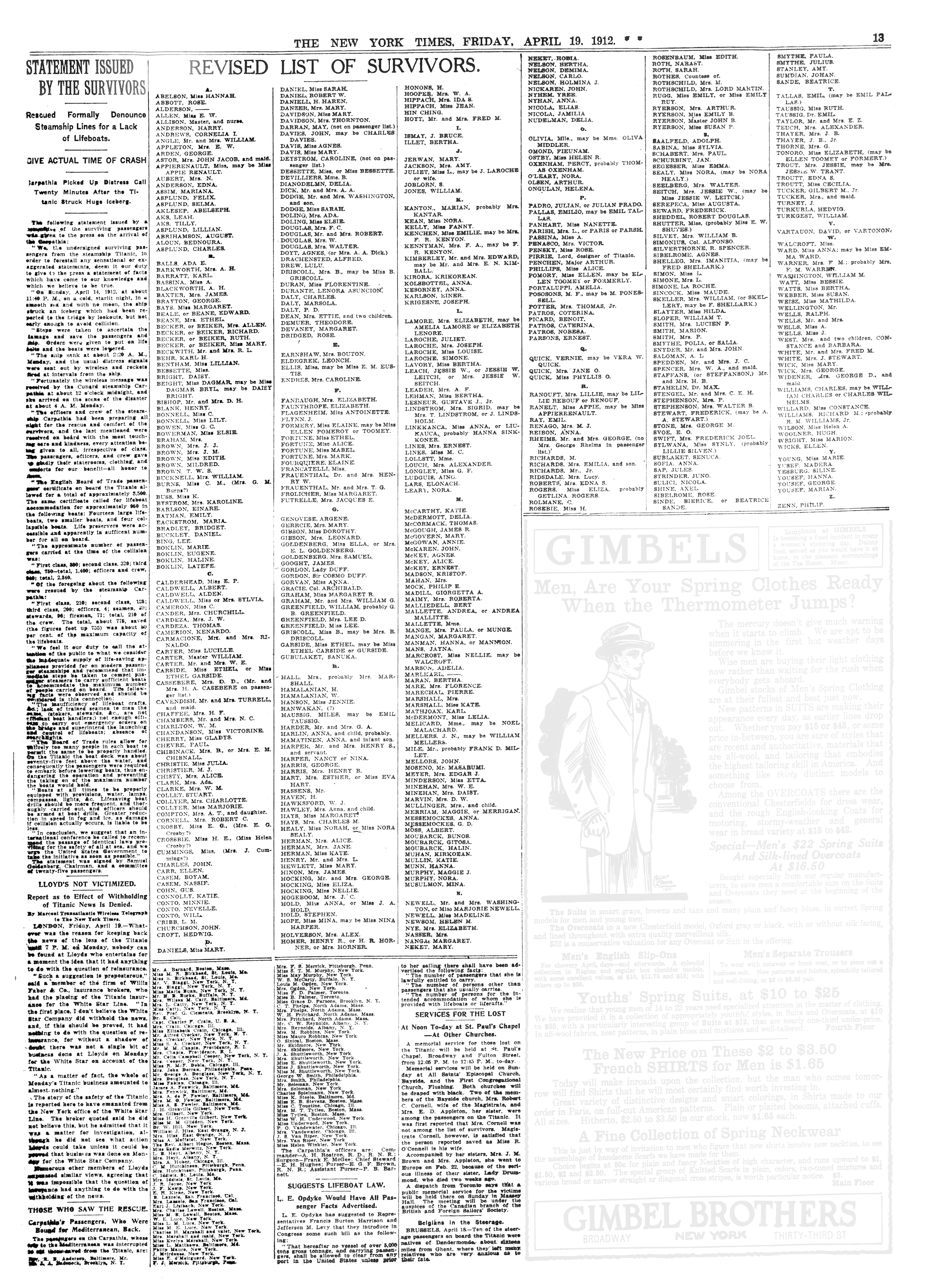
On April 19 The New York Times published this "Revised List of Survivors". A "Roll of the 1595 Missing" of the same date (click for image) was stated to be largely incomplete.

The following is a full list of known passengers who sailed on the maiden voyage of the Titanic.

Included in this list are the eight members of the ship's band, who were given passenger accommodations and treated as both passengers and crew. Also included are the nine members of the Guarantee Group who, though passengers, were aboard to make notes about the ship and assist the crew in case an issue arose with the brand new liner. Both are also included in the list of crew members on board Titanic.

Passengers are colour-coded, indicating whether they were saved or perished.
The passenger did not survive
The passenger survived

Survivors are listed with the lifeboat from which they were thought to be rescued, and many are not considered definitive. Victims whose remains were recovered after the sinking are listed with a superscript next to the body number, indicating the recovery vessel:

- MB – CS Mackay-Bennett (bodies 1–306)
- M – CS Minia (bodies 307–323)
- MM – CGS Montmagny (bodies 326–329)
- A – SS Algerine (body 330)
- O – RMS Oceanic (bodies 331–333)
- I – SS Ilford (body 334)
- OT – SS Ottawa (body 335)

Numbers 324 and 325 were unused, and the six bodies buried at sea by the Carpathia also went unnumbered.

=== First class ===
Name	Age	Hometown	Boarded	Destination	Lifeboat	Body
Allison, Mr. Hudson Joshua Creighton	30	Chesterville, Ontario, Canada	Southampton	Montreal, Quebec, Canada		135^{MB}
Allison, Mrs. Bess Waldo (née Daniels)	25	Montreal, Quebec, Canada	Southampton	Montreal, Quebec, Canada		
and cook, Miss Amelia Mary "Mildred" Brown (Note: Though their employers travelled in first class, this servant was given second class accommodations, as their services were not needed while their employers were on board.)	18	London, England, UK	Southampton	Montreal, Quebec, Canada	11	
and maid, Miss Sarah Daniels	33	Montreal, Quebec, Canada	Southampton	Montreal, Quebec, Canada	8	
and chauffeur, Swane, Mr. George	19	Montreal, Quebec, Canada	Southampton			294^{MB}
Allison, Miss Helen Loraine	2	Montreal, Quebec, Canada	Southampton	Montreal, Quebec, Canada		
Allison, Master Hudson Trevor	11 mo.	Montreal, Quebec, Canada	Southampton	Montreal, Quebec, Canada	11	
and nurse, Miss Alice Catherine Cleaver	22	London, England, UK	Southampton	Montreal, Quebec, Canada	11	
Anderson, Mr. Harry	47	New York City	Southampton	New York City	3	
Andrews, Miss Kornelia Theodosia	62	Hudson, New York, US	Cherbourg	Hudson, New York, US	10	
Andrews, Mr. Thomas (Note: Member of the Guarantee Group, representing Harland & Wolff; see "Guarantee Group" for more details.)	39	Belfast, Ireland, UK	Belfast	New York City		
Appleton, Mrs. Charlotte Lane (née Lamson)	53	New York City	Southampton	New York City	2	
Artagaveytia, Mr. Ramon	71	Montevideo, Uruguay	Cherbourg	New York City		22^{MB}
Astor, Colonel John Jacob IV	47	New York City	Cherbourg	New York City		124^{MB}
Astor, Mrs. Madeleine Talmage (née Force) (Note: Madeleine Astor was pregnant while on board the Titanic. She gave birth to a son, John Jacob VI, on 14 August 1912.)	18	New York City	Cherbourg	New York City	4	
and maid, Miss Rosalie Bidois	46	New York City	Cherbourg	New York City	4	
and nurse, Miss Caroline Louise Endres	39	New York City	Cherbourg	New York City	4	
Aubart, Mrs. Léontine Pauline	24	Paris, France	Cherbourg	New York City	9	
and maid, Miss Emma Sägesser	24	Paris, France	Cherbourg	New York City	9	
Barkworth, Mr. Algernon Henry Wilson	47	Hessle, East Yorkshire, England, UK	Southampton	New York City	B	
Baumann, Mr. John D.	60	New York City	Cherbourg	New York City		
Baxter, Mrs. Hélène (née de Lanaudière-Chaput)	50	Montreal, Quebec, Canada	Cherbourg	Montreal, Quebec, Canada	6	
Baxter, Mr. Quigg Edmond	24	Montreal, Quebec, Canada	Cherbourg	Montreal, Quebec, Canada		
Beattie, Mr. Thomson	36	Fergus, Ontario, Canada	Southampton	Fergus, Ontario, Canada	A (Note: After the Titanic sank, Thomson Beattie found his way aboard Collapsible A but did not survive the night. His body, along with those of two unidentified crewmembers, was found when the lifeboat was recovered a month later by the Oceanic.)	331^{O}
Beckwith, Mr. Richard Leonard	37	New York City	Southampton	New York City	5	
Beckwith, Mrs. Sallie (née Monypeny)	46	New York City	Southampton	New York City	5	
Behr, Mr. Karl Howell	26	New York City	Cherbourg	New York City	5	
Birnbaum, Mr. Jakob	24	Antwerp, Belgium	Cherbourg	San Francisco, California, US		148^{MB}
Bishop, Mr. Dickinson H. "Dick"	25	Dowagiac, Michigan, US	Cherbourg	Dowagiac, Michigan, US	7	
Bishop, Mrs. Helen (née Walton) (Note: Helen Bishop was pregnant while on board the Titanic. She gave birth to a son, Randall Walton, on 8 December 1912, who died a day after his birth.)	19	Dowagiac, Michigan, US	Cherbourg	Dowagiac, Michigan, US	7	
Björnström-Steffansson, Mr. Mauritz Håkan	28	Stockholm, Sweden	Southampton	Washington, D.C., US	D	
Blackwell, Mr. Stephen Weart	45	Trenton, New Jersey, US	Southampton	Trenton, New Jersey, US		
Blank, Mr. Henry	39	Glen Ridge, New Jersey, US	Cherbourg	Glen Ridge, New Jersey, US	7	
Bonnell, Miss Elizabeth	61	Youngstown, Ohio, US	Southampton	Youngstown, Ohio, US	8	
Bonnell, Miss Caroline	30	Youngstown, Ohio, US	Southampton	Youngstown, Ohio, US	8	
Borebank, Mr. John James	42	London, England, UK	Southampton	Toronto, Ontario, Canada		
Bowerman, Miss Elsie Edith	22	St Leonards-on-Sea, East Sussex, England, UK	Southampton	New York City	6	
Brady, Mr. John Bertram	41	Pomeroy, Washington, US	Southampton	Pomeroy, Washington, US		
Brandeis, Mr. Emil Franklin	48	Omaha, Nebraska, US	Cherbourg	Omaha, Nebraska, US		208^{MB}
Brereton, Mr. George Andrew (alias George A. Brayton) (Note: Passengers who travelled under an alias for various reasons.)	37	Los Angeles, California, US	Southampton	Los Angeles, California, US	9	
Brewe, Dr. Arthur Jackson	45	Philadelphia, Pennsylvania, US	Cherbourg	Philadelphia, Pennsylvania, US		
Brown, Mrs. Caroline Lane (née Lamson)	59	Belmont, Massachusetts, US	Southampton	Belmont, Massachusetts, US	D	
Brown, Mrs. Margaret (née Tobin)	44	Denver, Colorado, US	Cherbourg	Denver, Colorado, US	6	
Bucknell, Mrs. Emma Eliza (née Ward)	59	Philadelphia, Pennsylvania, US	Cherbourg	Philadelphia, Pennsylvania, US	8	
and maid, Miss Albina Bassani	36	Philadelphia, Pennsylvania, US	Cherbourg	Philadelphia, Pennsylvania, US	8	
Butt, Major Archibald Willingham	46	Washington, D.C., US	Southampton	Washington, D.C., US		
Calderhead, Mr. Edward Pennington	42	New York City	Southampton	New York City	5	
Candee, Mrs. Helen Churchill (née Hungerford)	53	Washington, D.C., US	Cherbourg	Washington, D.C., US	6	
Cardeza, Mrs. Charlotte Wardle (née Drake)	58	Germantown, Pennsylvania, US	Cherbourg	Germantown, Pennsylvania, US	3	
and maid, Miss Annie Moore Ward	38	Germantown, Pennsylvania, US	Cherbourg	Germantown, Pennsylvania, US	3	
Cardeza, Mr. Thomas Drake Martinez	36	Germantown, Pennsylvania, US	Cherbourg	Germantown, Pennsylvania, US	3	
and valet, Mr. Gustave J. Lesueur	35	Germantown, Pennsylvania, US	Cherbourg	Germantown, Pennsylvania, US	3	
Carlsson, Mr. Frans Olof	33	New York City	Southampton	New York City		
Carraú, Mr. Francisco Mauro Severiano	31	Montevideo, Uruguay	Southampton	Montevideo, Uruguay		
Carraú-Esteves, Mr. José Pedro	17	Montevideo, Uruguay	Southampton	Montevideo, Uruguay		
Carter, Mr. William Ernest	36	Bryn Mawr, Pennsylvania, US	Southampton	Bryn Mawr, Pennsylvania, US	C	
and valet, Mr. Alexander Cairns	28	Bryn Mawr, Pennsylvania, US	Southampton	Bryn Mawr, Pennsylvania, US		
and chauffeur, Mr. Charles Augustus Aldworth	30	Bryn Mawr, Pennsylvania, US	Southampton	Bryn Mawr, Pennsylvania, US		
Carter, Mrs. Lucile (née Polk)	36	Bryn Mawr, Pennsylvania, US	Southampton	Bryn Mawr, Pennsylvania, US	4	
and maid, Miss Auguste Serreplan	30	Bryn Mawr, Pennsylvania, US	Southampton	Bryn Mawr, Pennsylvania, US	4	
Carter, Miss Lucile Polk	13	Bryn Mawr, Pennsylvania, US	Southampton	Bryn Mawr, Pennsylvania, US	4	
Carter, Master William Thornton II	11	Bryn Mawr, Pennsylvania, US	Southampton	Bryn Mawr, Pennsylvania, US	4	
Case, Mr. Howard Brown	49	Ascot, Berkshire, England, UK	Southampton	Rochester, New York, US		
Cassebeer, Mrs. Eleanor Genevieve (née Fosdick)	36	New York, New York, US	Cherbourg	New York City	5	
Cavendish, Mr. Tyrell William	36	London, England, UK	Southampton	New York City		172^{MB}
Cavendish, Mrs. Julia Florence (née Siegel)	25	London, England, UK	Southampton	New York City	6	
and maid, Miss Ellen "Nellie" Barber	26	London, England, UK	Southampton	New York City	6	
Chaffee, Mr. Herbert Fuller	46	Amenia, North Dakota, US	Southampton	Amenia, North Dakota, US		
Chaffee, Mrs. Carrie Constance (née Toogood)	47	Amenia, North Dakota, US	Southampton	Amenia, North Dakota, US	4	
Chambers, Mr. Norman Campbell	27	New York City	Southampton	New York City	5	
Chambers, Mrs. Bertha (née Griggs)	32	New York City	Southampton	New York City	5	
Cherry, Miss Gladys	30	London, England, UK	Southampton	Vancouver, British Columbia, Canada	8	
Chevré, Mr. Paul Romaine Marie Léonce	45	Paris, France	Cherbourg	Ottawa, Ontario, Canada	7	
Chibnall, Mrs. Edith Martha Bowerman (née Barber)	48	St Leonards-on-Sea, East Sussex, England, UK	Southampton	New York City	6	
Chisholm, Mr. Roderick Robert Crispin	40	Belfast, Ireland, UK	Belfast	New York City		
Clark, Mr. Walter Miller	27	Los Angeles, California, US	Cherbourg	Los Angeles, California, US		
Clark, Mrs. Virginia Estelle (née McDowell)	26	Los Angeles, California, US	Cherbourg	Los Angeles, California, US	4	
Clifford, Mr. George Quincy	40	Stoughton, Massachusetts, US	Southampton	Stoughton, Massachusetts		
Colley, Mr. Edward Pomeroy	37	Dublin, Ireland, UK	Southampton	Vancouver, British Columbia, Canada		
Compton, Mrs. Mary Eliza (née Ingersoll)	64	Lakewood, New Jersey, US	Cherbourg	Lakewood, New Jersey, US	14	
Compton, Miss Sara Rebecca "Sadie"	39	Lakewood, New Jersey, US	Cherbourg	Lakewood, New Jersey, US	14	
Compton, Mr. Alexander Taylor Jr.	37	Lakewood, New Jersey, US	Cherbourg	Lakewood, New Jersey, US		
Cornell, Mrs. Malvina Helen (née Lamson)	55	New York City	Southampton	New York City	2	
Crafton, Mr. John Bertram	59	Roachdale, Indiana, US	Southampton	Roachdale, Indiana, US		
Crosby, Captain Edward	70	Milwaukee, Wisconsin, US	Southampton	Milwaukee, Wisconsin, US		269^{MB}
Crosby, Mrs. Catherine Elizabeth (née Halstead)	64	Milwaukee, Wisconsin, US	Southampton	Milwaukee, Wisconsin, US	5	
Crosby, Miss Harriette Rebecca	39	Milwaukee, Wisconsin, US	Southampton	Milwaukee, Wisconsin, US	5	
Cumings, Mr. John Bradley	39	New York City	Cherbourg	New York City		
Cumings, Mrs. Florence Briggs (née Thayer)	35	New York City	Cherbourg	New York City	4	
Daly, Mr. Peter Dennis	51	Lima, Peru	Southampton	Lima, Peru	A	
Daniel, Mr. Robert Williams	27	Philadelphia, Pennsylvania, US	Southampton	Philadelphia, Pennsylvania, US	?	
Davidson, Mr. Thornton	31	Montreal, Quebec, Canada	Southampton	Montreal, Quebec, Canada		
Davidson, Mrs. Orian (née Hays)	27	Montreal, Quebec, Canada	Southampton	Montreal, Quebec, Canada	3	
Dick, Mr. Albert Adrian	31	Calgary, Alberta, Canada	Southampton	Calgary, Alberta, Canada	3	
Dick, Mrs. Vera (née Gillespie)	17	Calgary, Alberta, Canada	Southampton	Calgary, Alberta, Canada	3	
Dodge, Dr. Washington	52	San Francisco, California, US	Southampton	San Francisco, California, US	13	
Dodge, Mrs. Ruth (née Vidaver)	34	San Francisco, California, US	Southampton	San Francisco, California, US	5	
Dodge, Master Washington Jr.	4	San Francisco, California, US	Southampton	San Francisco, California, US	5	
Douglas, Mr. Walter Donald	50	Minneapolis, Minnesota, US	Cherbourg	Minneapolis, Minnesota, US		62^{MB}
Douglas, Mrs. Mahala (née Dutton)	48	Minneapolis, Minnesota, US	Cherbourg	Minneapolis, Minnesota, US	2	
and maid, Miss Berthe Leroy	27	Minneapolis, Minnesota, US	Cherbourg	Minneapolis, Minnesota, US	2	
Douglas, Mrs. Mary Hélène (née Baxter)	27	Montreal, Quebec, Canada	Cherbourg	Montreal, Quebec, Canada	6	
Duff Gordon, Sir Cosmo Edmund (alias Mr. Morgan)	49	London, England, UK	Cherbourg	New York City	1	
Duff Gordon, Lucy Christiana, Lady (née Sutherland) (alias Mrs. Morgan)	48	London, England, UK	Cherbourg	New York City	1	
and secretary, Miss Laura Mabel Francatelli	31	London, England, UK	Cherbourg	New York City	1	
Dulles, Mr. William Crothers	39	Philadelphia, Pennsylvania, US	Cherbourg	Philadelphia, Pennsylvania, US		133^{MB}
Eustis, Miss Elizabeth Mussey	54	Brookline, Massachusetts, US	Cherbourg	Brookline, Massachusetts, US	4	
Evans, Miss Edith Corse	36	New York City	Cherbourg	New York City		
Flegenheim, Mrs. Antoinette "Tony" (née Wendt)	48	New York City	Cherbourg	New York City	7	
Flynn, Mr. John Irwin	36	Brooklyn, New York, US	Southampton	Brooklyn, New York, US	5	
Foreman, Mr. Benjamin Laventall	30	New York City	Southampton	New York City		
Fortune, Mr. Mark	64	Winnipeg, Manitoba, Canada	Southampton	Winnipeg, Manitoba, Canada		
Fortune, Mrs. Mary (née McDougald)	60	Winnipeg, Manitoba, Canada	Southampton	Winnipeg, Manitoba, Canada	10	
Fortune, Miss Ethel Flora	28	Winnipeg, Manitoba, Canada	Southampton	Winnipeg, Manitoba, Canada	10	
Fortune, Miss Alice Elizabeth	24	Winnipeg, Manitoba, Canada	Southampton	Winnipeg, Manitoba, Canada	10	
Fortune, Miss Mabel Helen	23	Winnipeg, Manitoba, Canada	Southampton	Winnipeg, Manitoba, Canada	10	
Fortune, Mr. Charles Alexander	19	Winnipeg, Manitoba, Canada	Southampton	Winnipeg, Manitoba, Canada		
Franklin, Mr. Thomas Parnham	37	London, England, UK	Southampton	New York, New York, US		
Frauenthal, Dr. Henry William	49	London, England, UK	Southampton	New York, New York, US	5	
Frauenthal, Mrs. Clara (née Heinsheimer)	42	London, England, UK	Southampton	New York, New York, US	5	
Frauenthal, Mr. Isaac Gerald	43	London, England, UK	Southampton	New York, New York, US	5	
Frölicher, Mr. Maximilian Josef	60	Zürich, Switzerland	Cherbourg	New York, New York, US	5	
Frölicher, Mrs. Margaretha Emerentia (née Stehli)	48	Zürich, Switzerland	Cherbourg	New York, New York, US	5	
Frölicher-Stehli, Miss Hedwig Margaritha	22	Zürich, Switzerland	Cherbourg	New York, New York, US	5	
Futrelle, Mr. Jacques Heath	37	Scituate, Massachusetts, US	Southampton	Scituate, Massachusetts, US		
Futrelle, Mrs. Lily May (née Peel)	35	Scituate, Massachusetts, US	Southampton	Scituate, Massachusetts, US	D	
Gee, Mr. Arthur H.	47	St Annes-on-Sea, Lancashire, England, UK	Southampton	Mexico City, Mexico		275^{MB}
Gibson, Mrs. Pauline Caroline (née Boeson)	44	New York City	Cherbourg	New York City	7	
Gibson, Miss Dorothy Winifred	22	New York City	Cherbourg	New York City	7	
Goldenberg, Mr. Samuel L.	47	Paris, France	Cherbourg	New York City	5	
Goldenberg, Mrs. Nella (née Wiggins)	40	Paris, France	Cherbourg	New York City	5	
Goldschmidt, Major George B.	71	New York, New York, US	Cherbourg	New York, New York, US		
Gracie IV, Colonel Archibald	53	Washington, D.C., US	Southampton	Washington, D.C., US	B	
Graham, Mr. George Edward	38	Winnipeg, Manitoba, Canada	Southampton	Winnipeg, Manitoba, Canada		147^{MB}
Graham, Mrs. Edith Ware (née Junkins)	59	Greenwich, Connecticut, US	Southampton	Greenwich, Connecticut, US	3	
Graham, Miss Margaret Edith	19	Greenwich, Connecticut, US	Southampton	Greenwich, Connecticut, US	3	
and governess, Miss Elizabeth Weed Shutes	40	Greenwich, Connecticut, US	Southampton	Greenwich, Connecticut, US	3	
Greenfield, Mrs. Blanche (née Strouse)	45	New York City	Cherbourg	New York City	7	
Greenfield, Mr. William Bertram	23	New York City	Cherbourg	New York City	7	
Guggenheim, Mr. Benjamin	46	Paris, France	Cherbourg	New York City		
and valet, Mr. Victor Giglio	24	Paris, France	Cherbourg	New York City		
and chauffeur, Mr. René Pernot	39	Paris, France	Cherbourg	New York City		
Harder, Mr. George Achilles	25	New York City	Cherbourg	New York City	5	
Harder, Mrs. Dorothy (née Annan)	21	New York City	Cherbourg	New York City	5	
Harper, Mr. Henry Sleeper	48	New York City	Cherbourg	New York City	3	
and dragoman, Mr. Hammad Hassab	27	Cairo, Egypt	Cherbourg	New York City	3	
Harper, Mrs. Myra Raymond (née Haxtun)	49	New York City	Cherbourg	New York City	3	
Harris, Mr. Henry Birkhardt	45	New York City	Southampton	New York City		
Harris, Mrs. Irene "Renee" (née Wallach)	35	New York City	Southampton	New York City	D	
Hawksford, Mr. Walter James	45	Kingston, Surrey, England, UK	Southampton	New York City	3	
Hays, Mr. Charles Melville	55	Montreal, Quebec, Canada	Southampton	Montreal, Quebec, Canada		307^{M}
and clerk, Mr. Vivian Ponsonby Payne	22	Montreal, Quebec, Canada	Southampton	Montreal, Quebec, Canada		
Hays, Mrs. Clara Jennings (née Grigg)	52	Montreal, Quebec, Canada	Southampton	Montreal, Quebec, Canada	3	
and maid, Miss Mary Anne Perreault	33	Montreal, Quebec, Canada	Southampton	Montreal, Quebec, Canada	3	
Hays, Miss Margaret Bechstein	24	New York City	Cherbourg	New York City	7	
Head, Mr. Christopher	42	Chelsea, London, England, UK	Southampton	New York City		
Hilliard, Mr. Herbert Henry	44	Brighton, Massachusetts, US	Southampton	Brighton, Massachusetts, US		
Hipkins, Mr. William Edward	55	Birmingham, West Midlands, England, UK	Southampton	New York City		
Hippach, Mrs. Ida Sophia (née Fischer)	44	Chicago, Illinois, US	Cherbourg	Chicago, Illinois, US	4	
Hippach, Miss Jean Gertrude	17	Chicago, Illinois, US	Cherbourg	Chicago, Illinois, US	4	
Hogeboom, Mrs. Anna Louisa (née Andrews)	51	Hudson, New York, US	Cherbourg	Hudson, New York, US	10	
Holverson, Mr. Alexander Oskar	42	New York City	Southampton	New York City		38^{MB}
Holverson, Mrs. Mary Aline (née Towner)	35	New York City	Southampton	New York City	8	
Homer, Mr. Harry (alias E. Haven)	40	Indianapolis, Indiana, US	Southampton	Indianapolis, Indiana, US	15	
Hoyt, Mr. Frederick Maxfield	35	New York City	Southampton	Stamford, Connecticut, US	D	
Hoyt, Mrs. Jane Anne (née Forby)	31	New York City	Southampton	Stamford, Connecticut, US	D	
Hoyt, Mr. William Fisher	42	New York City	Cherbourg	New York City	14	(Note: William Hoyt was pulled alive from the water, and onto Lifeboat 14, and thus is counted among the occupants of this boat; Hoyt, however, died during the night and his body was buried at sea from aboard the Carpathia.)
Isham, Miss Ann Elizabeth	50	Chicago, Illinois, US	Cherbourg	Chicago, Illinois, US		
Ismay, Mr. Joseph Bruce	49	Liverpool, Merseyside, England, UK	Southampton	New York City	C	
and valet, Mr. John Richard Fry	39	Liverpool, Merseyside, England, UK	Southampton	New York, New York, US		
and secretary, Mr. William Henry Harrison	45	Wallasey, Merseyside, England, UK	Southampton	New York, New York, US		110^{MB}
Jones, Mr. Charles Cresson	46	Bennington, Vermont, US	Southampton	Bennington, Vermont, US		80^{MB}
Julian, Mr. Henry Forbes	50	Torquay, Devon, England, UK	San Francisco, US			
Kent, Mr. Edward Austin	58	Buffalo, New York, US	Cherbourg	Buffalo, New York, US		258^{MB}
Kenyon, Mr. Frederick R.	41	Pittsburgh, Pennsylvania, US	Southampton	Pittsburgh, Pennsylvania, US		
Kenyon, Mrs. Marion (née Stauffer) (Note: Marion Kenyon was pregnant while on board the Titanic. She delivered a stillborn child sometime in 1912.)	31	Pittsburgh, Pennsylvania, US	Southampton	Pittsburgh, Pennsylvania, US	8	
Kimball, Mr. Edwin Nelson Jr.	42	Boston, Massachusetts, US	Southampton	Boston, Massachusetts, US	5	
Kimball, Mrs. Gertrude (née Parsons)	45	Boston, Massachusetts, US	Southampton	Boston, Massachusetts, US	5	
Klaber, Mr. Herman	45	Portland, Oregon, US	Southampton	Portland, Oregon, US		
Lambert-Williams, Mr. Fletcher Fellows	43	London, England, UK	Southampton	Newark, New Jersey, US		
Leader, Dr. Alice (née Farnham)	49	New York City	Southampton	New York City	8	
Leslie, Lucy Noël Martha, Countess of Rothes (née Dyer-Edwardes)	34	Vancouver, British Columbia, Canada	Southampton	Vancouver, British Columbia, Canada	8	
and maid, Miss Roberta Elizabeth Mary "Cissy" Maioni	20	Vancouver, British Columbia, Canada	Southampton	Vancouver, British Columbia, Canada	8	
Lewy, Mr. Ervin G.	31	Chicago, Illinois, US	Cherbourg	Chicago, Illinois, US		
Lindeberg-Lind, Mr. Erik Gustav (alias Edward Lingrey)	42	Jordanstorp, Södermanland, Sweden	Southampton	New York City		
Lindström, Mrs. Sigrid (née Posse)	55	Stockholm, Sweden	Cherbourg	New York City	6	
Lines, Mrs. Elizabeth Lindsey (née James)	50	Paris, France	Cherbourg	Hanover, New Hampshire, US	9	
Lines, Miss Mary Conover	16	Paris, France	Cherbourg	Hanover, New Hampshire, US	9	
Long, Mr. Milton Clyde	29	Springfield, Massachusetts, US	Southampton	Springfield, Massachusetts, US		126^{MB}
Longley, Miss Gretchen Fiske	21	Hudson, New York, US	Cherbourg	Hudson, New York, US	10	
Loring, Mr. Joseph Holland	30	London, England, UK	Southampton	New York City		
Madill, Miss Georgette Alexandra	16	St Louis, Missouri, US	Southampton	St Louis, Missouri, US	2	
Maguire, Mr. John Edward	30	Brockton, Massachusetts, US	Southampton	Brockton, Massachusetts, US		
Maréchal, Mr. Pierre Sr.	28	Paris, France	Cherbourg	New York City	7	
Marvin, Mr. Daniel Warner	18	New York City	Southampton	New York City		
Marvin, Mrs. Mary Graham Carmichael (née Farquarson) (Note: Mary Marvin was pregnant while on board the Titanic. She gave birth to a daughter, Margaret, sometime in 1912.)	18	New York City	Southampton	New York City	10	
Mayné, Miss Bertha Antonine	24	Brussels, Belgium	Cherbourg	Montreal, Quebec, Canada	6	
McCaffry, Mr. Thomas Francis	46	Vancouver, British Columbia, Canada	Southampton	Vancouver, British Columbia, Canada		292^{MB}
McCarthy, Mr. Timothy J.	54	Dorchester, Massachusetts, US	Southampton	Dorchester, Massachusetts, US		175^{MB}
McGough, Mr. James Robert	35	Philadelphia, Pennsylvania, US	Southampton	Philadelphia, Pennsylvania, US	7	
Meyer, Mr. Edgar Joseph	28	New York City	Cherbourg	New York City		
Meyer, Mrs. Leila (née Saks)	25	New York City	Cherbourg	New York City	6	
Millet, Mr. Francis Davis	63	East Bridgewater, Massachusetts, US	Cherbourg	East Bridgewater, Massachusetts, US		249^{MB}
Minahan, Dr. William Edward	44	Fond du Lac, Wisconsin, US	Southampton	Fond du Lac, Wisconsin, US		230^{MB}
Minahan, Mrs. Lillian E. (née Thorpe)	37	Fond du Lac, Wisconsin, US	Southampton	Fond du Lac, Wisconsin, US	14	
Minahan, Miss Daisy E.	33	Fond du Lac, Wisconsin, US	Southampton	Fond du Lac, Wisconsin, US	14	
Mock, Mr. Philipp Edmund	30	New York City	Cherbourg	New York City	11	
Molson, Mr. Harry Markland	55	Montreal, Quebec, Canada	Southampton	Montreal, Quebec, Canada		
Moore, Mr. Clarence	47	Washington, D.C., US	Southampton	Washington, D.C., US		
and valet, Mr. Charles Henry Harrington	37	Washington, D.C., US	Southampton	Washington, D.C., US		
Natsch, Mr. Charles	36	Brooklyn, New York, US	Cherbourg	Brooklyn, New York, US		
Newell, Mr. Arthur Webster	58	Lexington, Massachusetts, US	Cherbourg	Lexington, Massachusetts, US		122^{MB}
Newell, Miss Madeleine	31	Lexington, Massachusetts, US	Cherbourg	Lexington, Massachusetts, US	6	
Newell, Miss Marjorie Anne	23	Lexington, Massachusetts, US	Cherbourg	Lexington, Massachusetts, US	6	
Newsom, Miss Helen Monypeny	19	New York City	Southampton	New York City	5	
Nicholson, Mr. Arthur Ernest	64	Shanklin, Isle of Wight, England, UK	Southampton	New York City		263^{MB}
Nourney, Mr. Alfred (alias Baron von Drachstedt) (Note: Transferred from second class to first class.)	20	Cologne, German Empire (Note: Now Germany.)	Cherbourg	New York City	7	
Omont, Mr. Alfred Fernand	29	Le Havre, France	Cherbourg	New York City	7	
Ostby, Mr. Engelhart Cornelius	64	Providence, Rhode Island, US	Southampton	Providence, Rhode Island, US		234^{MB}
Ostby, Miss Helene Ragnhild	22	Providence, Rhode Island, US	Southampton	Providence, Rhode Island, US	5	
Ovies y Rodriguez, Mr. Servando José Florentino	36	Havana, Cuba	Cherbourg	Havana, Cuba		189^{MB}
Parr, Mr. William Henry Marsh	29	Belfast, Ireland, UK	Belfast	New York City		
Partner, Mr. Austin	40	Tolworth, London, England, UK	Southampton	Toronto, Ontario, Canada		166^{MB}
Pears, Mr. Bill Clinton	29	Isleworth, London, England, UK	Southampton	New York City		
Pears, Mrs. Edith (née Wearne)	22	Isleworth, London, England, UK	Southampton	New York City	8	
Peñasco y Castellana, Mr. Victor	24	Madrid, Spain	Cherbourg	New York City		
Peñasco y Castellana, Mrs. Maria Josefa (née Perez de Soto y Vallejo)	22	Madrid, Spain	Cherbourg	New York City	8	
and maid, Doña Fermina Oliva y Ocana	39	Madrid, Spain	Cherbourg	New York City	8	
Peuchen, Major Arthur Godfrey	52	Toronto, Ontario, Canada	Southampton	Toronto, Ontario, Canada	6	
Porter, Mr. Walter Chamberlain	46	Worcester, Massachusetts, US	Southampton	Worcester, Massachusetts, US		207^{MB}
Potter, Mrs. Lily Alexenia (née Wilson)	56	Philadelphia, Pennsylvania, US	Cherbourg	Philadelphia, Pennsylvania, US	7	
Reuchlin, The Honourable Mr. Johan George	38	Rotterdam, The Netherlands	Southampton	New York City		
Rheims, Mr. George Alexander Lucien	36	Paris, France	Southampton	New York City	A	
Robert, Mrs. Elisabeth Walton (née McMillan)	43	St. Louis, Missouri, US	Southampton	St. Louis, Missouri, US	2	
and maid, Miss Emilie Kreuchen	29	St. Louis, Missouri, US	Southampton	St. Louis, Missouri, US	2	
Roebling, Mr. Washington Augustus II	31	Trenton, New Jersey, US	Southampton	Trenton, New Jersey, US		
Romaine, Mr. Charles Hallance (alias C. Rolmane)	45	New York City	Southampton	New York City	9	
Rood, Mr. Hugh Roscoe	38	Seattle, Washington, US	Southampton	Seattle, Washington, US		
Rosenbaum, Miss Edith Louise	34	Paris, France	Cherbourg	Cincinnati, Ohio, US	11	
Rosenshine, Mr. George (alias George Thorne)	46	New York City	Cherbourg	New York City		16^{MB}
Ross, Mr. John Hugo	36	Winnipeg, Manitoba, Canada	Southampton	Winnipeg, Manitoba, Canada		
Rothschild, Mr. Martin	46	New York City	Cherbourg	New York City		
Rothschild, Mrs. Elizabeth Jane Anne (née Barrett)	54	New York City	Cherbourg	New York City	6	
Rowe, Mr. Alfred G.	59	Liverpool, Merseyside, England, UK	Southampton	New York City		109^{MB}
Ryerson, Mr. Arthur Larned	61	Cooperstown, New York, US	Cherbourg	Cooperstown, New York, US		
Ryerson, Mrs. Emily Maria (née Borie)	48	Cooperstown, New York, US	Cherbourg	Cooperstown, New York, US	4	
and maid, Miss Victorine Chaudanson	36	Cooperstown, New York, US	Cherbourg	Cooperstown, New York, US	4	
Ryerson, Miss Susan Parker "Suzette"	21	Cooperstown, New York, US	Cherbourg	Cooperstown, New York, US	4	
Ryerson, Miss Emily Borie	18	Cooperstown, New York, US	Cherbourg	Cooperstown, New York, US	4	
Ryerson, Master John Borie "Jack"	13	Cooperstown, New York, US	Cherbourg	Cooperstown, New York, US	4	
and governess, Miss Grace Scott Bowen	45	Cooperstown, New York, US	Cherbourg	Cooperstown, New York, US	4	
Saalfeld, Mr. Adolphe	47	Manchester, England, UK	Southampton	New York City	3	
Salomon, Mr. Abraham Lincoln	43	New York City	Cherbourg	New York City	1	
Schabert, Mrs. Emma Mary Blake (née Mock)	35	Hamburg, German Empire	Cherbourg	New York City	11	
Seward, Mr. Frederic Kimber	34	New York City	Southampton	New York City	7	
Silverthorne, Mr. Spencer Victor	35	St Louis, Missouri, US	Southampton	St Louis, Missouri, US	5	
Silvey, Mr. William Baird	50	Duluth, Minnesota, US	Cherbourg	Duluth, Minnesota, US		
Silvey, Mrs. Alice (née Munger)	39	Duluth, Minnesota, US	Cherbourg	Duluth, Minnesota, US	11	
Simonius-Blumer, Colonel Alfons	56	Basel, Switzerland	Southampton	New York City	3	
Sloper, Mr. William Thompson	28	New Britain, Connecticut, US	Southampton	New Britain, Connecticut, US	7	
Smart, Mr. John Montgomery	56	Kildale, North Yorkshire, England, UK	Southampton	New York City		
Smith, Mr. James Clinch	56	Paris, France	Cherbourg	Long Island, New York, US		
Smith, Mr. Lucien Philip	24	Huntington, West Virginia, US	Cherbourg	Huntington, West Virginia, US		
Smith, Mrs. Mary Eloise (née Hughes) (Note: Eloise Smith was pregnant while on board the Titanic. She gave birth to a son, Lucien Philip Jr., on 19 November 1912.)	18	Huntington, West Virginia, US	Cherbourg	Huntington, West Virginia, US	6	
Smith, Mr. Richard William	57	Streatham, London, England, UK	Southampton	New York City		
Snyder, Mr. John Pillsbury	24	Minneapolis, Minnesota, US	Southampton	Minneapolis, Minnesota, US	7	
Snyder, Mrs. Nellie (née Stevenson)	23	Minneapolis, Minnesota, US	Southampton	Minneapolis, Minnesota, US	7	
Spedden, Mr. Frederic Oakley	45	Tuxedo Park, New York, US	Cherbourg	Tuxedo Park, New York, US	3	
Spedden, Mrs. Margaretta Corning (née Stone)	39	Tuxedo Park, New York, US	Cherbourg	Tuxedo Park, New York, US	3	
and maid, Miss Helen Alice Wilson	31	Tuxedo Park, New York, US	Cherbourg	Tuxedo Park, New York, US	3	
Spedden, Master Robert Douglas	6	Tuxedo Park, New York, US	Cherbourg	Tuxedo Park, New York, US	3	
and nurse, Miss Elizabeth Margaret Burns	41	Tuxedo Park, New York, US	Cherbourg	Tuxedo Park, New York, US	3	
Spencer, Mr. William Augustus	57	New York City	Cherbourg	New York City		
Spencer, Mrs. Marie Eugénie (née Demougeot)	45	New York City	Cherbourg	New York City	6	
and maid, Miss Eugenie Elise Lurette	59	New York City	Cherbourg	New York City	6	
Stähelin-Maeglin, Dr. Max	32	Basel, Switzerland	Southampton	New York City	3	
Stead, Mr. William Thomas	62	London, England, UK	Southampton	New York City		
Stengel, Mr. Charles Emil Henry	54	Newark, New Jersey, US	Cherbourg	Newark, New Jersey, US	1	
Stengel, Mrs. Annie May (née Morris)	44	Newark, New Jersey, US	Cherbourg	Newark, New Jersey, US	5	
Stephenson, Mrs. Martha (née Eustis)	52	Paris, France	Cherbourg	Haverford, Pennsylvania, US	4	
Stewart, Mr. Albert A.	54	Cincinnati, Ohio, US	Cherbourg	Gallipolis, Ohio, US		
Stone, Mrs. Martha Evelyn (née Stevens)	62	New York City	Southampton	New York City	6	
and maid, Miss Amelie "Amelia" Icard	38	New York City	Southampton	New York City	6	
Straus, Mr. Isidor	67	New York City	Southampton	New York City		96^{MB}
and valet, Mr. John Farthing	57	New York City	Southampton	New York City		
Straus, Mrs. Rosalie Ida (née Blun)	63	New York City	Southampton	New York City		
and maid, Miss Ellen Bird	31	New York City	Southampton	New York City	8	
Sutton, Mr. Frederick	61	Haddonfield, New Jersey, US	Southampton	Haddonfield, New Jersey, US		46^{MB}
Swift, Mrs. Margaret Welles (née Barron)	46	New York City	Southampton	New York City	8	
Taussig, Mr. Emil	52	New York City	Southampton	New York City		
Taussig, Mrs. Tillie (née Mandelbaum)	39	New York City	Southampton	New York City	8	
Taussig, Miss Ruth	18	New York City	Southampton	New York City	8	
Taylor, Mr. Elmer Zebley	48	London, England, UK	Southampton	East Orange, New Jersey, US	5	
Taylor, Mrs. Juliet Cummins (née Wright)	48	London, England, UK	Southampton	East Orange, New Jersey, US	5	
Thayer, Mr. John Borland II	49	Haverford, Pennsylvania, US	Cherbourg	Haverford, Pennsylvania, US		
Thayer, Mrs. Marian Longsteth (née Morris)	39	Haverford, Pennsylvania, US	Cherbourg	Haverford, Pennsylvania, US	4	
and maid, Miss Margaret Fleming	42	Haverford, Pennsylvania, US	Cherbourg	Haverford, Pennsylvania, US	4	
Thayer, Mr. John Borland "Jack" III	17	Haverford, Pennsylvania, US	Cherbourg	Haverford, Pennsylvania, US	B	
Thorne, Mrs. Gertrude Maybelle (née McMinn)	37	New York City	Cherbourg	New York City	D	
Tucker, Mr. Gilbert Milligan Jr.	31	Albany, New York, US	Cherbourg	Albany, New York, US	7	
Uruchurtu, Don Manuel E.	39	Mexico City, Mexico	Cherbourg	Mexico City, Mexico		
Van der Hoef, Mr. Wyckoff	61	Brooklyn, New York, US	Belfast	Brooklyn, New York, US		245^{MB}
Walker, Mr. William Anderson	48	East Orange, New Jersey, US	Southampton	East Orange, New Jersey, US		
Warren, Mr. Frank Manley	63	Portland, Oregon, US	Cherbourg	Portland, Oregon, US		
Warren, Mrs. Anna Sophia (née Atkinson)	60	Portland, Oregon, US	Cherbourg	Portland, Oregon, US	5	
Weir, Colonel John	59	New York City	Southampton	New York City		
White, Mr. Percival Wayland	54	Brunswick, Maine, US	Southampton	Brunswick, Maine, US		
White, Mr. Richard Frasar	21	Brunswick, Maine, US	Southampton	Brunswick, Maine, US		169^{MB}
White, Mrs. Ella (née Holmes)	55	New York City	Cherbourg	New York City	8	
and maid, Miss Amelia Mayo "Nellie" Bessette	39	New York City	Cherbourg	New York City	8	
and manservant, Mr. Sante Righini	22	New York City	Cherbourg	New York City		232^{MB}
Wick, Colonel George Dennick	58	Youngstown, Ohio, US	Southampton	Youngstown, Ohio, US		
Wick, Mrs. Mary (née Hitchcock)	45	Youngstown, Ohio, US	Southampton	Youngstown, Ohio, US	8	
Wick, Miss Mary Natalie	31	Youngstown, Ohio, US	Southampton	Youngstown, Ohio, US	8	
Widener, Mr. George Dunton	50	Philadelphia, Pennsylvania, US	Southampton	Philadelphia, Pennsylvania, US		
and valet, Mr. Edwin Herbert Keeping	33	Philadelphia, Pennsylvania, US	Southampton	Philadelphia, Pennsylvania, US		45^{MB}
Widener, Mrs. Eleanor (née Elkins)	50	Philadelphia, Pennsylvania, US	Southampton	Philadelphia, Pennsylvania, US	4	
and maid, Miss Amalie Henriette "Emily" Gieger	35	Philadelphia, Pennsylvania, US	Southampton	Philadelphia, Pennsylvania, US	4	
Widener, Mr. Harry Elkins	27	Philadelphia, Pennsylvania, US	Southampton	Philadelphia, Pennsylvania, US		
Willard, Miss Constance	21	Duluth, Minnesota, US	Southampton	Duluth, Minnesota, US	8	
Williams, Mr. Charles Duane	51	Geneva, Switzerland	Cherbourg	Radnor, Pennsylvania, US		
Williams, Mr. Richard Norris II	21	Geneva, Switzerland	Cherbourg	Radnor, Pennsylvania, US	A	
Woolner, Mr. Hugh	45	London, England, UK	Southampton	New York City	D	
Wright, Mr. George	62	Halifax, Nova Scotia, Canada	Southampton	Halifax, Nova Scotia, Canada		
Young, Miss Marie Grice	36	New York City	Cherbourg	New York City	8	

=== Second class ===
Name	Age	Hometown	Boarded	Destination	Lifeboat	Body
Abelson, Mr. Samuel	30	Russia	Cherbourg	New York, New York, US		
Abelson, Mrs. Anna (née Nantes Jacobson)	28	Russia	Cherbourg	New York, New York, US	10	
Andrew, Mr. Edgar Samuel	17	San Ambrosio, Córdoba, Argentina	Southampton	Trenton, New Jersey, US		
Andrew, Mr. Frank Thomas	30	Redruth, Cornwall, England	Southampton	Houghton, Michigan, US		
Angle, Mr. William A.	32	Warwick, Warwickshire, England	Southampton	New York City		
Angle, Mrs. Florence Agnes "Mary" (née Hughes)	36	Warwick, Warwickshire, England	Southampton	New York City	11	
Ashby, Mr. John	57	West Hoboken, New Jersey, US	Southampton	West Hoboken, New Jersey, US		
Bailey, Mr. Percy Andrew	18	Penzance, Cornwall, England	Southampton	Akron, Ohio, US		
Bainbrigge, Mr. Charles Robert	23	Saint Peter Port, Guernsey, Channel Islands	Southampton	New York City		
Ball, Mrs. Ada E. (née Hall)	36	Bristol, Avon, England	Southampton	Jacksonville, Florida, US	10	
Banfield, Mr. Frederick James	28	Plymouth, Devon, England	Southampton	Houghton, Michigan, US		
Bateman, Reverend Robert James	51	Jacksonville, Florida, US	Southampton	Jacksonville, Florida, US		174^{MB}
Beane, Mr. Edward	32	New York City	Southampton	New York City	13	
Beane, Mrs. Ethel (née Clarke)	19	Norwich, Norfolk, England	Southampton	New York City	13	
Beauchamp, Mr. Henry James	28	London, England, UK	Southampton	New York City		194^{MB}
Becker, Mrs. Nellie E. (née Baumgardner)	35	Guntur, Madras Province, British India (Note: Now India)	Southampton	Benton Harbor, Michigan, US	11	
Becker, Miss Ruth Elizabeth	12	Guntur, Madras Province, British India	Southampton	Benton Harbor, Michigan, US	13	
Becker, Miss Marion Louise	4	Guntur, Madras Province, British India	Southampton	Benton Harbor, Michigan, US	11	
Becker, Master Richard Frederick	1	Guntur, Madras Province, British India	Southampton	Benton Harbor, Michigan, US	11	
Beesley, Mr. Lawrence	34	London, England, UK	Southampton	Toronto, Ontario, Canada	13	
Bentham, Miss Lillian W.	19	Rochester, New York, US	Southampton	Rochester, New York, US	12	
Berriman, Mr. William John	23	St. Ives, Cornwall, England	Southampton	Calumet, Michigan, US		
Botsford, Mr. William Hull	25	Orange, New Jersey, US	Southampton	Orange, New Jersey, US		
Bowenur, Mr. Solomon	42	London, England	Southampton	New York City		
Bracken, Mr. James H.	29	Lake Arthur, New Mexico, US	Southampton	Lake Arthur, New Mexico, US		
Brailey, Mr. William Theodore (Note: Member of the ship's orchestra; see "Musicians" for more details.)	24	London, England	Southampton	New York City		
Bricoux, Mr. Roger Marie	20	Monte Carlo, Monaco	Southampton	New York City		
Brito, Mr. José Joaquim de	40	Loulé, Portugal	Southampton	São Paulo, Brazil		
Brown, Mr. Thomas William Solomon	60	Cape Town, Union of South Africa (Note: Now South Africa)	Southampton	Seattle, Washington, US		
Brown, Mrs. Elizabeth Catherine (née Ford)	40	Cape Town, Union of South Africa	Southampton	Seattle, Washington, US	14	
Brown, Miss Edith Eileen	15	Cape Town, Union of South Africa	Southampton	Seattle, Washington, US	14	
Bryhl, Mr. Kurt Arnold Gottfrid	25	Skara, Västergötland, Sweden	Southampton	Rockford, Illinois, US		
Bryhl, Miss Dagmar Jenny Ingeborg	20	Skara, Västergötland, Sweden	Southampton	Rockford, Illinois, US	12	
Buss, Miss Kate	36	Sittingbourne, Kent, England	Southampton	San Francisco, US	9	
Butler, Mr. Reginald Fenton	25	Southsea, Hampshire, England	Southampton	New York City		97^{MB}
Byles, Father Thomas Roussel Davids	42	London, England	Southampton	Jacksonville, Florida, US		
Byström, Miss Karolina	42	New York City	Southampton	New York City	?	
Caldwell, Mr. Albert Francis	26	Bangkok, Siam (Note: Now Thailand)	Southampton	Roseville, Illinois, US	13	
Caldwell, Mrs. Sylvia Mae (née Harbaugh)	28	Bangkok, Siam	Southampton	Roseville, Illinois, US	13	
Caldwell, Master Alden Gates	10 mo.	Bangkok, Siam	Southampton	Roseville, Illinois, US	13	
Cameron, Miss Clear Annie	35	London, England, UK	Southampton	Mamaronek, New York, US	14	
Campbell, Mr. William Henry	21	Belfast, Ireland	Belfast	New York City		
Carbines, Mr. William	19	St. Ives, Cornwall, England	Southampton	Houghton, Michigan, US		18^{MB}
Carter, Father Ernest Courtenay	54	London, England, UK	Southampton	New York City		
Carter, Mrs. Lilian (née Hughes)	45	London, England, UK	Southampton	New York City		
Chapman, Mr. Charles Henry	52	Bronx, New York, US	Southampton	Bronx, New York, US		130^{MB}
Chapman, Mr. John Henry	36	Liskeard, Cornwall, England	Southampton	Spokane, Washington, US		17^{MB}
Chapman, Mrs. Sara Elizabeth (née Lawry)	28	Liskeard, Cornwall, England	Southampton	Spokane, Washington, US		
Christy, Mrs. Alice Frances	45	London, England, UK	Southampton	Montreal, Quebec, Canada	12	
Christy, Miss Rachel Julie Cohen	25	London, England, UK	Southampton	Montreal, Quebec, Canada	12	
Clarke, Mr. Charles Valentine	29	Netley Abbey, Hampshire, England	Southampton	San Francisco, California, US		
Clarke, Mrs. Ada Maria	28	Netley Abbey, Hampshire, England	Southampton	San Francisco, California, US	14	
Clarke, Mr. John Frederick Preston	30	Liverpool, Merseyside, England	Southampton	New York City		202^{MB}
Coleridge, Mr. Reginald Charles	29	London, England	Southampton	Detroit, Michigan, US		
Collander, Mr. Erik Gustaf	27	Helsinki, Grand Duchy of Finland (Note: Now Finland)	Southampton	Ashtabula, Ohio, US		
Collett, Mr. Sidney Clarence Stuart	25	London, England	Southampton	Port Byron, New York, US	9	
Collyer, Mr. Harvey	31	Bishopstoke, Hampshire, England	Southampton	Payette, Idaho, US		
Collyer, Mrs. Charlotte Annie (née Tate)	31	Bishopstoke, Hampshire, England	Southampton	Payette, Idaho, US	14	
Collyer, Miss Marjorie Charlotte "Lottie"	8	Bishopstoke, Hampshire, England	Southampton	Payette, Idaho, US	14	
Cook, Mrs. Selena (née Rogers)	22	Oxford, Oxfordshire, England	Southampton	New York City	14	
Corbett, Mrs. Irene (née Colvin)	30	Provo, Utah, US	Southampton	Provo, Utah, US		
Corey, Mrs. Mary Phyllis Elizabeth (née Miller)	30	Pittsburgh, Pennsylvania, US	Southampton	Pittsburgh, Pennsylvania, US		
Cotterill, Mr. Henry "Harry"	20	Penzance, Cornwall, England	Southampton	Akron, Ohio, US		
Cunningham, Mr. Alfred Fleming	21	Belfast, Ireland	Belfast	New York City		
Davies, Mr. Charles Henry	21	Lyndhurst, Hampshire, England	Southampton	Eden, Manitoba, Canada		
Davies, Mrs. Elizabeth Agnes Mary (née White)	48	St. Ives, Cornwall, England UK	Southampton	Houghton, Michigan, US	14	
Davies, Master John Morgan Jr.	8	St. Ives, Cornwall, England UK	Southampton	Houghton, Michigan, US	14	
Davis, Miss Mary	28	London, England, UK	Southampton	Tottenville, New York, US	13	
Deacon, Mr. Percy William	20	Fritham, Hampshire, England, UK	Southampton	Boston, Massachusetts, US		
del Carlo, Mr. Sebastiano	29	Montecarlo, Lucca, Tuscany, Italy	Cherbourg	Chicago, Illinois, US		295^{MB}
del Carlo, Mrs. Argene (née Genovesi) (Note: Argene del Carlo was pregnant while on board the Titanic. She gave birth to a daughter, Maria Salvata, on 14 November 1912.)	24	Montecarlo, Lucca, Tuscany, Italy	Cherbourg	Chicago, Illinois, US	11	
Denbuoy, Mr. Albert "Herbert"	25	Guernsey, Channel Islands, UK	Southampton	Elizabeth, New Jersey, US		
Dibden, Mr. William	18	Lyndhurst, Hampshire, England	Southampton	Eden, Manitoba, Canada		
Doling, Mrs. Ada Julia (née Bone)	34	Southampton, Hampshire, England, UK	Southampton	New York City	?	
Doling, Miss Elsie	19	Southampton, Hampshire, England, UK	Southampton	New York City	?	
Douton, Mr. William Joseph	55	Rochester, New York, US	Southampton	Rochester, New York, US		
Drew, Mr. James Vivian	42	Greenport, New York, US	Southampton	Greenport, New York, US		
Drew, Mrs. Lulu Thorne (née Christian)	34	Greenport, New York, US	Southampton	Greenport, New York, US	10	
Drew, Master Marshall Brines	8	Greenport, New York, US	Southampton	Greenport, New York, US	10	
Duran y More, Miss Florentina	30	Barcelona, Catalonia, Spain	Cherbourg	Havana, Cuba	12	
Duran y More, Miss Asunción	27	Barcelona, Catalonia, Spain	Cherbourg	Havana, Cuba	12	
Fahlstrøm, Mr. Arne Joma	18	Oslo, Norway	Southampton	Bayonne, New Jersey, US		
Faunthorpe, Mr. Harry Bartram	40	Liverpool, Merseyside, England, UK		Philadelphia, Pennsylvania, US		286^{MB}
Fillbrook, Mr. Joseph Charles	18	Truro, Cornwall, England, UK		Houghton, Michigan, US		
Fox, Mr. Stanley Hubert	38	Rochester, New York, US		Rochester, New York, US		236^{MB}
Frost, Mr. Anthony Wood "Artie"	37	Belfast, Ireland	Belfast	New York City		
Funk, Miss Annie Clemmer	38	Janjgir-Champa, British India	Southampton	Bally, Pennsylvania, US		
Fynney, Mr. Joseph J.	35	Liverpool, Merseyside, England, UK	Southampton	Montreal, Quebec, Canada		322^{M}
Gale, Mr. Harry	38	Harrowbarrow, Cornwall, England, UK	Southampton	Clear Creek, Colorado, US		
Gale, Mr. Shadrach	33	Harrowbarrow, Cornwall, England, UK	Southampton	Clear Creek, Colorado, US		
Garside, Miss Ethel	34	Liverpool, Merseyside, England	Southampton	Brooklyn, New York, US	12	
Gaskell, Mr. William Alfred	18	Liverpool, Merseyside, England	Southampton	Montreal, Quebec, Canada		
Gavey, Mr. Laurence	26	Guernsey, Channel Islands	Southampton	Elizabeth, New Jersey, US		
Gilbert, Mr. William	47	Carleens, Cornwall, England	Southampton	Butte, Montana, US		
Giles, Mr. Edgar	21	Porthleven, Cornwall, England	Southampton	Camden, New Jersey, US		
Giles, Mr. Frederick Edward	20	Porthleven, Cornwall, England	Southampton	Camden, New Jersey, US		
Giles, Mr. Ralph	25	London, England	Southampton	New York City		297^{MB}
Gill, Mr. John William	24	Clevedon, North Somerset, England	Southampton	New York City		155^{MB}
Gillespie, Mr. William Henry	34	Abbeyleix, Laois, Ireland	Southampton	Vancouver, British Columbia, Canada		
Givard, Mr. Hans Kristensen	30	Kølsen, Vorde Sogn, Denmark	Southampton	San Francisco, California, US		305^{MB}
Greenberg, Mr. Samuel	52	Bronx, New York, US	Southampton	Bronx, New York, US		19^{MB}
Hale, Mr. Reginald	30	Auburn, New York, US	Southampton	Auburn, New York, US		75^{MB}
Hämäläinen, Mrs. Anna (Anna Hamlin)	24	Detroit, Michigan, US	Southampton	Detroit, Michigan, US	4	
Hämäläinen, Master Viljo Unto Johannes (William Hamlin)	1	Detroit, Michigan, US	Southampton	Detroit, Michigan, US	4	
Harbeck, Mr. William H.	44	Toledo, Ohio, US	Southampton	Montreal, Quebec, Canada		35^{MB}
Harper, The Reverend John	39	London, England	Southampton	Chicago, Illinois, US		
Harper, Miss Annie Jessie "Nina"	6	London, England	Southampton	Chicago, Illinois, US	11	
Harris, Mr. George	62	London, England	Southampton	New York City	15	
Harris, Mr. Walter	30	London, England	Southampton	New York City		
Hart, Mr. Benjamin	47	Ilford, Essex, England	Southampton	Winnipeg, Manitoba, Canada		
Hart, Mrs. Esther Ada (née Bloomfield)	48	Ilford, Essex, England	Southampton	Winnipeg, Manitoba, Canada	14	
Hart, Miss Eva Miriam	7	Ilford, Essex, England	Southampton	Winnipeg, Manitoba, Canada	14	
Hartley, Mr. Wallace Henry	33	Dewsbury, West Yorkshire, England	Southampton	New York City		224^{MB}
Herman, Mr. Samuel	49	Yeovil, Somerset, England	Southampton	Bernardsville, New Jersey, US		
Herman, Mrs. Jane (née Laver)	48	Yeovil, Somerset, England	Southampton	Bernardsville, New Jersey, US	9	
Herman, Miss Alice	24	Yeovil, Somerset, England	Southampton	Bernardsville, New Jersey, US	9	
Herman, Miss Kate	24	Yeovil, Somerset, England	Southampton	Bernardsville, New Jersey, US	9	
Hewlett, Mrs. Mary Dunbar (née Kingcome)	56	Lucknow, British India, UK	Southampton	Rapid City, South Dakota, US	13	
Hickman, Mr. Lewis	30	Fritham, Hampshire, England	Southampton	The Pas, Manitoba, Canada		256^{MB}
Hickman, Mr. Leonard Mark	24	Fritham, Hampshire, England	Southampton	Eden, Manitoba, Canada		
Hickman, Mr. Stanley George	20	Fritham, Hampshire, England	Southampton	The Pas, Manitoba, Canada		
Hiltunen, Miss Martta	18	Joensuu, Grand Duchy of Finland	Southampton	Detroit, Michigan, US		
Hocking, Mrs. Elizabeth "Eliza" (née Neads)	54	Penzance, Cornwall, England	Southampton	Akron, Ohio, US	4	
Hocking, Mr. Richard George	23	Akron, Ohio, US	Southampton	Akron, Ohio, US		
Hocking, Miss Ellen "Nellie"	20	Penzance, Cornwall, England	Southampton	Akron, Ohio, US	4	
Hocking, Mr. Samuel James Metcalfe	36	Devonport, Devon, England	Southampton	Middletown, Connecticut, US		
Hodges, Mr. Henry Price	50	Southampton, Hampshire, England	Southampton	Boston, Massachusetts, US		149^{MB}
Hold, Mr. Stephen	44	Porthoustock, Cornwall, England	Southampton	Sacramento, California, US		
Hold, Mrs. Annie Margaret (née Hill)	29	Porthoustock, Cornwall, England	Southampton	Sacramento, California, US	10	
Hood, Mr. Ambrose Jr.	21	Fritham, Hampshire, England	Southampton	Manitoba, Canada		
Hosono, Mr. Masabumi	41	Tokyo, Japan	Southampton	Tokyo, Japan	10	
Howard, Mr. Benjamin	63	Swindon, Wiltshire, England	Southampton	Idaho, US		
Howard, Mrs. Ellen Truelove (née Arman)	60	Swindon, Wiltshire, England	Southampton	Idaho, US		
Hume, Mr. John Law "Jock"	21	Dumfries, Scotland	Southampton	New York City		193^{MB}
Hunt, Mr. George Henry	33	Philadelphia, Pennsylvania, US	Southampton	Philadelphia, Pennsylvania, US		
Ilett, Miss Bertha	17	Jersey, Channel Islands	Southampton	Atlanta, Georgia, US	?	
Jacobsohn, Mr. Sidney Samuel	40	London, England	Southampton	Montreal, Quebec, Canada		
Jacobsohn, Mrs. Amy Frances Christy (née Cohen)	24	London, England	Southampton	Montreal, Quebec, Canada	12	
Jarvis, Mr. Denzil John	47	Stoneygate, Leicestershire, England	Southampton	New York City		
Jefferys, Mr. Clifford Thomas	24	Guernsey, Channel Islands	Southampton	Elizabeth, New Jersey, US		
Jefferys, Mr. Ernest Wilifred	22	Guernsey, Channel Islands	Southampton	Elizabeth, New Jersey, US		
Jenkin, Mr. Stephen Curnow	32	St. Ives, Cornwall, England	Southampton	Houghton, Michigan, US		
Jerwan, Mrs. Marie Marthe (née Thuillard)	23	New York City	Southampton	New York City	11	
Kantor, Mr. Sinai	34	Vitebsk, Russian Empire	Southampton	Bronx, New York, US		283^{MB}
Kantor, Mrs. Miriam (née Sternin)	24	Vitebsk, Russian Empire	Southampton	Bronx, New York, US	12	
Karnes, Mrs. Claire (née Bennett)	28	Pittsburgh, Pennsylvania, US	Southampton	Pittsburgh, Pennsylvania, US		
Keane, Mr. Daniel	35	Limerick, Ireland	Queenstown	St Louis, Missouri, US		
Keane, Miss Nora Agnes	46	Castleconnell, Limerick, Ireland	Queenstown	Harrisburg, Pennsylvania, US	10	
Kelly, Miss Florence "Fannie"	45	London, England	Southampton	New York City	9	
Kirkland, Reverend Charles Leonard	52	Glasgow, Scotland	Queenstown	Tuxford, Saskatchewan, Canada		
Knight, Mr. Robert J.	39	Belfast, Ireland	Belfast	New York City		
Krins, Mr. Georges Alexandré	23	London, England	Southampton	New York City		
Kvillner, Mr. Johan Henrik Johannesson	31	Trollhättan, Västergötland, Sweden	Southampton	Arlington, Virginia, US		165^{MB}
Lahtinen, Reverend William	35	Minneapolis, Minnesota, US	Southampton	Minneapolis, Minnesota, US		
Lahtinen, Mrs. Anna Amelia (née Sylfvén)	26	Minneapolis, Minnesota, US	Southampton	Minneapolis, Minnesota, US		
Lamb, Mr. John Joseph	30	Glencree, Ireland	Queenstown	Providence, Rhode Island, US		
Laroche, Mr. Joseph Philippe Lemercier	25	Paris, France	Cherbourg	Cap-Haïtien, Haiti		
Laroche, Mrs. Juliette Marie Louise (née Lafargue) (Note: Juliette Laroche was pregnant while on board the Titanic. She gave birth to a son, Joseph Lemercier, on 17 December 1912.)	22	Paris, France	Cherbourg	Cap-Haïtien, Haiti	14	
Laroche, Miss Simone Marie Anne Andrée	3	Paris, France	Cherbourg	Cap-Haïtien, Haiti	14	
Laroche, Miss Louise Marguerite	1	Paris, France	Cherbourg	Cap-Haïtien, Haiti	14	
Lehmann, Miss Bertha	17	Lotzwil, Switzerland	Cherbourg	Central City, Iowa, US	12	
Leitch, Miss Jessie Wills	31	London, England	Southampton	Chicago, Illinois, US	11	
Lemore, Mrs. Amelia "Milley" (née Hunt)	34	Chicago, Illinois, US	Southampton	Chicago, Illinois, US	14	
Levy, Mr. René Jacques	36	Montreal, Quebec, Canada	Cherbourg	Montreal, Quebec, Canada		
Leyson, Mr. Robert William Norman	25	London, England	Southampton	New York City		108^{MB}
Lingane, Mr. John	61	Chelsea, Michigan, US	Southampton	Chelsea, Michigan, US		
Louch, Mr. Charles Alexander	50	Weston-super-Mare, North Somerset, England	Southampton	New York City		121^{MB}
Louch, Mrs. Alice Adelaide (née Slow)	42	Weston-super-Mare, North Somerset, England	Southampton	New York City	14	
Mack, Mrs. Mary (née Lacy)	57	Southampton, Hampshire, England	Southampton	New York City		52^{MB}
Malachard, Mr. Jean-Noël	25	Paris, France	Cherbourg	New York City		
Mallet, Mr. Albert	31	Montreal, Quebec, Canada	Cherbourg	Montreal, Quebec, Canada		
Mallet, Mrs. Antoinette Marie (née Magnin)	24	Montreal, Quebec, Canada	Cherbourg	Montreal, Quebec, Canada	10	
Mallet, Master André Clément	1	Montreal, Quebec, Canada	Cherbourg	Montreal, Quebec, Canada	10	
Mangiavacchi, Mr. Serafino Emilio	30	Paris, France	Cherbourg	New York City		
Matthews, Mr. William John	30	St Austell, Cornwall, England	Southampton	La Salle, Illinois, US		
Maybery, Mr. Frank Hubert	36	Weston-super-Mare, North Somerset, England	Southampton	Moose Jaw, Saskatchewan, Canada		
McCrae, Mr. Arthur Gordon	32	Sydney, New South Wales, Australia	Southampton	Canada		209^{MB}
McCrie, Mr. James Matthew	32	Sarnia, Ontario, Canada	Southampton	Sarnia, Ontario, Canada		
McKane, Mr. Peter David	46	Guernsey, Channel Islands	Southampton	Rochester, New York, US		
Mellinger, Mrs. Elizabeth Anne (née Maidment)	41	Wimbledon, London, England	Southampton	Bennington, Vermont, US	14	
Mellinger, Miss Madeleine Violet	13	Wimbledon, London, England	Southampton	Bennington, Vermont, US	14	
Mellors, Mr. William John	19	Chelsea, London, England	Southampton	Long Island, New York, US	A	
Meyer, Mr. August	31	Harrow, London, England	Southampton	New York City		
Milling, Mr. Jacob Christian	48	Odense, Denmark	Southampton	Oregon, Wisconsin, US		271^{MB}
Mitchell, Mr. Henry Michael	71	Guernsey, Channel Islands	Southampton	Toledo, Ohio, US		
Montvila, Father Juozas	27	Gudinė, Lithuania	Southampton	Worcester, Massachusetts, US		
Moraweck, Dr. Ernest	54	Frankfort, Kentucky, US	Southampton	Frankfort, Kentucky, US		
Morley, Mr. Henry Samuel (alias Mr. Henry Marshall)	38	Birmingham, Worcester, England	Southampton	Los Angeles, US		
Mudd, Mr. Thomas Charles	16	Huntingfield, Suffolk, England	Southampton	New York City		
Myles, Mr. Thomas Francis	63	Fermoy, Ireland	Queenstown	Waban, Massachusetts, US		
Nassr Allah, Mr. Niqula Khalil	28	Zahlé, Lebanon, Ottoman Empire (Note: Now Lebanon)	Cherbourg	Cleveland, Ohio, US		43^{MB}
Nassr Allah, Mrs. Adal (née Akim) (Note: Adele Nasser was pregnant while on board the Titanic. She gave birth to son Nicholas, on 9 December 1912 who died hours after his birth.)	17	Zahlé, Lebanon, Ottoman Empire	Cherbourg	Cleveland, Ohio, US	?	
Navratil, Mr. Michel (alias Charles Hoffman)	32	Nice, France	Southampton	New York City		15^{MB}
Navratil, Master Michel Marcel (alias John Hoffman)	3	Nice, France	Southampton	New York City	D	
Navratil, Master Edmond Roger (alias Fred Hoffman)	2	Nice, France	Southampton	New York City	D	
Nesson, Mr. Israel	26	London, England	Southampton	Boston, Massachusetts, US		
Nicholls, Mr. Joseph Charles "Joe"	19	St. Ives, Cornwall, England	Southampton	Houghton, Michigan, US		101^{MB}
Norman, Mr. Robert Douglas	28	Glasgow, Scotland	Southampton	Houghton, Michigan, US		287^{MB}
Nye, Mrs. Elizabeth (née Ramell)	29	East Orange, New Jersey, US	Southampton	East Orange, New Jersey, US	11	
Otter, Mr. Richard	39	Middleburg Heights, Ohio, US	Southampton	Middleburg Heights, Ohio, US		
Oxenham, Mr. Percy Thomas	22	London, England	Southampton	North Bergen, New Jersey, US	13	
Padron Manent, Mr. Julian	26	Barcelona, Catalonia, Spain	Cherbourg	Havana, Cuba	9	
Pain, Dr. Alfred "Alf"	23	Hamilton, Ontario, Canada	Southampton	Hamilton, Ontario, Canada		
Pallas y Castello, Mr. Emilio	29	Barcelona, Catalonia, Spain	Cherbourg	Havana, Cuba	9	
Parker, Mr. Clifford Richard	28	Guernsey, Channel Islands	Southampton	New York City		
Parkes, Mr. Francis "Frank"	18	Belfast, Ireland	Belfast	New York City		
Parrish, Mrs. Lutie Davis (née Temple)	60	Woodford County, Kentucky, US	Southampton	Woodford County, Kentucky, US	12	
Pengelly, Mr. Frederick William	19	Gunnislake, Cornwall, England	Southampton	Butte, Montana, US		
Peruschitz, Father Josef	28	Scheyern, Bavaria, German Empire	Southampton	St. Cloud, Minnesota, US		
Phillips, Mr. Escott Robert	42	Ilfracombe, Devon, England	Southampton	New Brighton, Pennsylvania, US		
Phillips, Miss Alice Frances Louisa	21	Ilfracombe, Devon, England	Southampton	New Brighton, Pennsylvania, US	12	
Phillips, Miss Kate Florence (alias Mrs. Kate Marshall) (Note: Kate Phillips gave birth to a daughter, Ellen Mary "Betty", on 11 January 1913. Miss Phillips was having an affair with Henry Morley, and the two were running away together.)	19	Birmingham, Worcester, England	Southampton	Los Angeles, US	11	
Pinsky, Mrs. Rosa	21	Brooklyn, New York, US	Southampton	Brooklyn, New York, US	9	
Ponesell, Mr. Martin	34	Southampton, Hampshire, England	Southampton	New York City		
Portaluppi, Mr. Emilio Ilario Giuseppe	34	Milford, New Hampshire, US	Southampton	Milford, New Hampshire, US	?	
Pulbaum, Mr. Franz	27	New York City	Southampton	New York City		
Quick, Mrs. Jane (née Richards)	33	Plymouth, Devon, England	Southampton	Detroit, Michigan, US	11	
Quick, Miss Winnifred Vera	8	Plymouth, Devon, England	Southampton	Detroit, Michigan, US	11	
Quick, Miss Phyllis May	2	Plymouth, Devon, England	Southampton	Detroit, Michigan, US	11	
Reeves, Mr. David	36	Slinfold, West Sussex, England	Southampton	New York City		
Renouf, Mr. Peter Henry	33	Elizabeth, New Jersey, US	Southampton	Elizabeth, New Jersey, US		
Renouf, Mrs. Lillian "Lily" (née Jefferys)	30	Elizabeth, New Jersey, US	Southampton	Elizabeth, New Jersey, US	12	
Reynaldo, Miss Encarnación	28	Marbella, Spain	Southampton	New York City	9	
Richard, Mr. Emile Philippe	23	Paris, France	Cherbourg	Montreal, Quebec, Canada		
Richards, Mrs. Emily (née Hocking)	23	Penzance, Cornwall, England	Southampton	Akron, Ohio, US	4	
Richards, Master William Rowe	3	Penzance, Cornwall, England	Southampton	Akron, Ohio, US	4	
Richards, Master Sibley George	9 mo.	Penzance, Cornwall, England	Southampton	Akron, Ohio, US	4	
Ridsdale, Miss Lucy	50	London, England	Southampton	Marietta, Ohio, US	13	
Rogers, Mr. Reginald Harry	18	Tavistock, Devon, England	Southampton	Wilkes Barre, Pennsylvania, US		
Rugg, Miss Emily	21	Guernsey, Channel Islands	Southampton	Wilmington, Delaware, US	12	
Schmidt, Mr. August	26	Newark, New Jersey, US	Southampton	Newark, New Jersey, US		
Sedgwick, Mr. Charles Frederick Waddington	25	Liverpool, Merseyside, England	Southampton	Minatitlán, Veracruz, Mexico		
Sharp, Mr. Percival James	27	London, England, UK	Southampton	New York City		
Shelley, Mrs. Imanita (née Parrish Hall)	25	Deer Lodge, Montana, US	Southampton	Deer Lodge, Montana, US	12	
Silvén, Miss Lyyli Karolina	17	Tornio, Grand Duchy of Finland	Southampton	Minneapolis, Minnesota, US	16	
Sincock, Miss Maude	20	St. Ives, Cornwall, England	Southampton	Hancock, Michigan, US	D	
Sinkkonen, Miss Anna	30	Turku, Grand Duchy of Finland	Southampton	Brighton, Boston, Massachusetts, US	10	
Sjöstedt, Mr. Ernst Adolf	30	Hjo, Västergötland, Sweden	Southampton	Sault Ste Marie, Michigan, US	10	
Slayter, Miss Hilda Mary	30	Halifax, Nova Scotia, Canada	Queenstown	Vancouver, British Columbia, Canada	13	
Slemen, Mr. Richard James	35	Landrake, Cornwall, England	Southampton	Nashua, New Hampshire, US		
Smith, Miss Marion Elsie	39	Basingstoke, Hampshire, England	Southampton	Washington, DC US	9	
Sobey, Mr. Samuel James Hayden	25	Porthallow, Cornwall, England	Southampton	Houghton, Michigan, US		
Stanton, Mr. Samuel Ward	42	New York City	Southampton	New York City		
Stokes, Mr. Philip Joseph	25	London, England	Southampton	Detroit, Michigan, US		81^{MB}
Sweet, Mr. George Frederick	14	Yeovil, Somerset, England	Southampton	Bernardsville, New Jersey, US		
Taylor, Mr. Percy Cornelius	32	London, England	Southampton	New York City		
Toomey, Miss Ellen Mary	48	Indianapolis, Indiana, US	Southampton	Indianapolis, Indiana, US	9	
Troupiansky, Mr. Moses Aaron	23	London, England	Southampton	New York City		
Trout, Mrs. Jessie L.	26	Columbus, Ohio, US	Southampton	Columbus, Ohio, US	9	
Troutt, Miss Edwina Celia "Winnie"	27	Bath, Somerset, England	Southampton	Auburndale, Massachusetts, US	D	
Turpin, Mr. William John Robert	29	Plymouth, Devon, England	Southampton	Salt Lake City, Utah, US		
Turpin, Mrs. Dorothy Ann (née Wonnacott)	27	Plymouth, Devon, England	Southampton	Salt Lake City, Utah, US		
Veal, Mr. James	40	Barre, Vermont, US	Southampton	Barre, Vermont, US		
Wallcroft, Miss Ellen "Nellie"	36	Maidenhead, Berkshire, England	Southampton	Mamaroneck, New York, US	14	
Ware, Mr. John James	45	Bristol, Avon, England	Southampton	New Britain, Connecticut, US		
Ware, Mrs. Florence Louise (née Long)	31	Bristol, Avon, England	Southampton	New Britain, Connecticut, US	10	
Ware, Mr. William Jeffery	23	Gunnislake, Cornwall, England	Southampton	Butte, Montana, US		
Watson, Mr. Ennis Hastings	18	Belfast, Ireland	Belfast	New York City		
Watt, Mrs. Elizabeth Inglis "Bessie" (née Milne)	40	Aberdeen, Aberdeenshire, Scotland	Southampton	Portland, Oregon, US	9	
Watt, Miss Robertha Josephine "Bertha"	12	Aberdeen, Aberdeenshire, Scotland	Southampton	Portland, Oregon, US	9	
Webber, Miss Susan	37	Bude, Cornwall, England	Southampton	Hartford, Connecticut, US	12	
Weisz, Mr. Leopold	28	Bromsgrove, Worcestershire, England	Southampton	Montreal, Quebec, Canada		293^{MB}
Weisz, Mrs. Mathilde Françoise (née Pëde)	37	Bromsgrove, Worcestershire, England	Southampton	Montreal, Quebec, Canada	10	
Wells, Mrs. Addie Dart (née Trevaskis)	29	Heamoor, Cornwall, England	Southampton	Akron, Ohio, US	14	
Wells, Miss Joan	4	Heamoor, Cornwall, England	Southampton	Akron, Ohio, US	14	
Wells, Master Ralph Lester	2	Heamoor, Cornwall, England	Southampton	Akron, Ohio, US	14	
West, Mr. Edwy Arthur	36	Bournemouth, Dorset, England	Southampton	Gainesville, Florida, US		
West, Mrs. Ada Mary (née Worth) (Note: Ada West was pregnant while on board the Titanic. She gave birth to a daughter, Edwyna, sometime in 1912.)	33	Bournemouth, Dorset, England	Southampton	Gainesville, Florida, US	10	
West, Miss Constance Mirium	4	Bournemouth, Dorset, England	Southampton	Gainesville, Florida, US	10	
West, Miss Barbara Joyce	10 mo.	Bournemouth, Dorset, England	Southampton	Gainesville, Florida, US	10	
Wheadon, Mr. Edward H.	66	Guernsey, Channel Islands	Southampton	Edgewood, Rhode Island, US		
Wheeler, Mr. Edwin Charles "Fred"	24	Bath, Somerset, England	Southampton	Asheville, North Carolina, US		
Whilems, Mr. Charles	32	London, England	Southampton	New York City	9	
Wilkinson, Miss Elizabeth Anne (alias Mrs. Lizzie Faunthorpe) (Note: Faunthorpe was a married woman who was posing as the wife of the unmarried Harry Bartram Faunthorpe. Aboard, they told others they were going away on their honeymoon.)	29	Manchester, England	Southampton	Philadelphia, Pennsylvania, US	16	
Williams, Mr. Charles Eugene	23	Harrow, London, England	Southampton	Chicago, Illinois, US	14	
Woodward, Mr. John Wesley	32	Oxford, Oxfordshire, England	Southampton	New York City		
Wright, Miss Marion	26	Yeovil, Somerset, England	Southampton	Cottage Grove, Oregon, US	9	
Yvois, Miss Henriette	24	Paris, France	Southampton	Montreal, Quebec, Canada		

=== Third class ===
Name	age	Hometown	Home country	Boarded	Destination	Lifeboat	Body
Abbing, Mr. Anthony	40	Cincinnati, Ohio	US	Southampton	Cincinnati, Ohio, US		
Abbott, Mrs. Rhoda Mary (née Hunt)	39	East Providence, Rhode Island	US	Southampton	East Providence, Rhode Island, US	A	
Abbott, Mr. Rossmore Edward	16	East Providence, Rhode Island	US	Southampton	East Providence, Rhode Island, US		190^{MB}
Abbott, Mr. Eugene Joseph	14	East Providence, Rhode Island	US	Southampton	East Providence, Rhode Island, US		
Abd al-Khaliq, Mr. Farid Qasim Husayn	18	Shana	Syria	Cherbourg	New York City		
Abelseth, Miss Karen Marie	16	Sunnmøre	Norway	Southampton	Los Angeles, California, US	16	
Abelseth, Mr. Olaus Jørgensen	25	Perkins County, South Dakota	US	Southampton	Perkins County, South Dakota, US	A	
Abrahamsson, Mr. Abraham August Johannes	20	Dalsbruk	Finland	Southampton	Hoboken, New Jersey, US	15	
Abrahim, Mrs. Mary Sophie Halaut (née Easu)	18	Shwayhad	Syria	Cherbourg	Greensburg, Pennsylvania, US	C	
Ådahl, Mr. Mauritz	30	Asarum, Blekinge	Sweden	Southampton	Brooklyn, New York, US		72^{MB}
Adams, Mr. John	26	Bournemouth, Dorset	England	Southampton	La Porte City, Iowa, US		103^{MB}
Ahlin, Mrs. Johanna Persdotter (née Larsson)	40	Göteborg, Västergötland	Sweden	Southampton	Akeley, Minnesota, US		
Aks, Mrs. Leah (née Rosen)	21	London	England	Southampton	Norfolk, Virginia, US	13	
Aks, Master Frank Philip	10 mo.	London	England	Southampton	Norfolk, Virginia, US	11	
Al-Muna, Mr. Nasif Qasim	26	Fredericksburg, Virginia	US	Cherbourg	Fredericksburg, Virginia, US	15	
Alexander, Mr. William	23	Great Yarmouth, Norfolk	England	Southampton	Albion, Michigan, US		
Alhomäki, Mr. Ilmari Rudolf	19	Salo	Finland	Southampton	Astoria, Oregon, US		
Ali, Mr. Ahmed	24	Buenos Aires	Argentina	Southampton	New York City		
Ali, Mr. William	25	Buenos Aires	Argentina	Southampton	New York City		79^{MB}
Allen, Mr. William Henry	35	Birmingham, West Midlands	England	Southampton	New York City		
Allum, Mr. Owen George	15	Southall, London	England	Southampton	New York City		259^{MB}
Al-Zainni, Mr. Fahim Ruhanna	22	Toula	Syria	Cherbourg	Dayton, Ohio, US	6	
Andersen, Mr. Albert Karvin	33	Bergen	Norway	Southampton	New York City		260^{MB}
Andersen-Jensen, Miss Carla Christine	19	Eskilstrup	Denmark	Southampton	Portland, Oregon, US	16	
Andersson, Mr. Anders Johan	39	Kisa, Östergötland	Sweden	Southampton	Winnipeg, Manitoba, Canada		
Andersson, Mrs. Alfrida Konstantia (née Brogren)	39	Kisa, Östergötland	Sweden	Southampton	Winnipeg, Manitoba, Canada		
Andersson, Mr. August Edvard (alias August Wennerström)	27	Malmö, Skåne	Sweden	Southampton	Chicago, Illinois, US	A	
Andersson, Miss Sigrid Elisabeth	11	Kisa, Östergötland	Sweden	Southampton	Winnipeg, Manitoba, Canada		
Andersson, Miss Ingeborg Constanzia	9	Kisa, Östergötland	Sweden	Southampton	Winnipeg, Manitoba, Canada		
Andersson, Miss Ebba Iris Alfrida	6	Kisa, Östergötland	Sweden	Southampton	Winnipeg, Manitoba, Canada		
Andersson, Master Sigvard Harald Elias	4	Kisa, Östergötland	Sweden	Southampton	Winnipeg, Manitoba, Canada		
Andersson, Miss Ellis Anna Maria	2	Kisa, Östergötland	Sweden	Southampton	Winnipeg, Manitoba, Canada		
Andersson, Miss Erna Alexandra	17	Ruotsinpyhtää	Finland	Southampton	New York City	D	
Andersson, Miss Ida Augusta Margareta	38	Vadsbro, Sörmland	Sweden	Southampton	Manistee, Michigan, US		
Andersson, Mr. Johan Samuel	26	Hartford, Connecticut	US	Southampton	Hartford, Connecticut, US		
Andreasson, Mr. Paul Edvin	20	Kalfsnäs, Småland	Sweden	Southampton	Chicago, Illinois, US		
Angheloff, Mr. Minko	26	Terziysko, Troyan	Bulgaria	Southampton	Chicago, Illinois, US		
Arnold-Franchi, Mr. Josef	25	Altdorf, Uri	Switzerland	Southampton	New Glarus, Wisconsin, US		
Arnold-Franchi, Mrs. Josefine (née Franchi)	18	Altdorf, Uri	Switzerland	Southampton	New Glarus, Wisconsin, US		
Aronsson, Mr. Ernst Axel Algot	24	Horset, Småland	Sweden	Southampton	Joliet, Illinois, US		
Asim, Mr. Adola	35	Buenos Aires	Argentina	Southampton	New York City		
Asplund, Mr. Carl Oscar Vilhelm Gustafsson	40	Alseda, Småland	Sweden	Southampton	Worcester, Massachusetts, US		142^{MB}
Asplund, Mrs. Selma Augusta Emilia (née Johansson)	38	Alseda, Småland	Sweden	Southampton	Worcester, Massachusetts, US	15	
Asplund, Master Filip Oscar	13	Alseda, Småland	Sweden	Southampton	Worcester, Massachusetts, US		
Asplund, Master Clarence Gustaf Hugo	9	Alseda, Småland	Sweden	Southampton	Worcester, Massachusetts, US		
Asplund, Master Carl Edgar	5	Alseda, Småland	Sweden	Southampton	Worcester, Massachusetts, US		
Asplund, Miss Lillian Gertrud	5	Alseda, Småland	Sweden	Southampton	Worcester, Massachusetts, US	15	
Asplund, Master Edvin Rojj Felix	3	Alseda, Småland	Sweden	Southampton	Worcester, Massachusetts, US	15	
Asplund, Mr. Johan Charles	23	Oskarshamn, Kalmar	Sweden	Southampton	Minneapolis, Minnesota, US	13	
Assaf, Mrs. Mariyam (née Khalil)	45	Kafr Mishki	Syria	Cherbourg	Ottawa, Ontario, Canada	C	
Assam, Mr. Ali	23	Buenos Aires	Argentina	Southampton	New York City		
Attala, Mr. Sleiman	30	Ottawa, Ontario	Canada	Cherbourg	Ottawa, Ontario, Canada		
Atta Allah, Miss Malakah	17	Beirut	Syria	Cherbourg	New York City		
Augustsson, Mr. Albert	23	Krakoryd, Småland	Sweden	Southampton	Bloomington, Indiana, US		
Ayyub Dahir, Miss Bannurah	15	Beirut	Syria	Cherbourg	Owen Sound, Ontario, Canada	C	
Bakus, Mr. Raful	20	Unknown	Syria	Cherbourg	New York City		
Backström, Mr. Karl Alfred	32	Kotka	Finland	Southampton	New York City		
Backström, Mrs. Maria Mathilda (née Gustafsson) (Note: Maria Backström was pregnant while on board the Titanic. She gave birth to a daughter, Alfhild Maria, in June 1912.)	33	Kotka	Finland	Southampton	New York City	D	
Badman, Miss Emily Louisa	18	Clevedon, North Somerset	England	Southampton	Skaneateles, New York, US	C	
Badt, Mr. Mohamed	40	Tripoli	Syria	Cherbourg	New York City		
Bakić, Mr. Kerim	26	Bosanska Krupa	Bosnia	Southampton	Harrisburg, Pennsylvania, US		
Banski, Mrs. Mara (née Osman)	31	Vagovina	Croatia	Southampton	Steelton, Pennsylvania, US	?	
Baqlini, Mrs. Mariyam Latifa (née Qurban)	24	Ḑuhūr ash Shuwayr	Syria	Cherbourg	Brooklyn, New York, US	C	
Baqlini, Miss Mariya Katarin	5	Ḑuhūr ash Shuwayr	Syria	Cherbourg	Brooklyn, New York, US	C	
Baqlini, Miss Eujini	4	Ḑuhūr ash Shuwayr	Syria	Cherbourg	Brooklyn, New York, US	C	
Baqlini, Miss Hileni Barbarah	9 mo.	Ḑuhūr ash Shuwayr	Syria	Cherbourg	Brooklyn, New York, US	C	
Barbarah, Mrs. Katarin Dawud	45	Kafr Mishki	Syria	Cherbourg	Ottawa, Ontario, Canada		
Barbarah, Miss Saidah	18	Kafr Mishki	Syria	Cherbourg	Ottawa, Ontario, Canada		
Barry, Miss Julia	26	New York City, New York	US	Queenstown	New York City		
Barton, Mr. David John	22	Cambridge, Cambridgeshire	England	Southampton	New York City		
Beavan, Mr. William Thomas	18	Fillingham, Lincolnshire	England	Southampton	Russell, US		
Bengtsson, Mr. Johan Viktor	26	Fridhemsberg, Halland	Sweden	Southampton	Monee, Illinois, US		
Berglund, Mr. Karl Ivar Sven	22	Firtby	Finland	Southampton	New York City		
Betros, Mr. Tannous	20	Zgharta	Syria	Cherbourg	Waterbury, Connecticut, US		
Birkeland, Mr. Hans Martin Monsen	21	Bremnes	Norway	Southampton	New York City		
Björklund, Mr. Ernst Herbert	18	Stockholm	Sweden	Southampton	New York City		
Bostandyeff, Mr. Guentcho	26	Unknown	Bulgaria	Southampton	Chicago, Illinois, US		
Bourke, Mr. John	42	Carrowskehine, Mayo	Ireland	Queenstown	Chicago, Illinois, US		
Bourke, Mrs. Catherine (née McHugh)	32	Carrowskehine, Mayo	Ireland	Queenstown	Chicago, Illinois, US		
Bourke, Miss Mary	40	Carrowskehine, Mayo	Ireland	Queenstown	Chicago, Illinois, US		
Bowen, Mr. David John "Dai"	20	Treherbert, Glamorgan	Wales	Southampton	New York City		
Bradley, Miss Bridget Delia	22	Kingwilliamstown, Cork	Ireland	Queenstown	Glen Falls, New York, US	13	
Braf, Miss Elin Ester Maria	20	Medeltorp, Småland	Sweden	Southampton	Chicago, Illinois, US		
Braund, Mr. Lewis Richard	29	Bridgerule, Devon	England	Southampton	Qu'Appelle Valley, Saskatchewan, Canada		
Braund, Mr. Owen Harris	22	Bridgerule, Devon	England	Southampton	Qu'Appelle Valley, Saskatchewan, Canada		
Brobeck, Mr. Karl Rudolf	22	Norrköping, Östergötland	Sweden	Southampton	Worcester, Massachusetts, US		
Brocklebank, Mr. William Alfred	35	Broomfield, Essex	England	Southampton	New York City		
Buckley, Mr. Daniel	21	Kingwilliamstown, Cork	Ireland	Queenstown	New York City	13	
Buckley, Miss Catherine	22	Ovens, Cork	Ireland	Queenstown	Roxbury, Massachusetts, US		299^{MB}
Bulus, Mrs. Sultanah (née Rizq)	40	Unknown	Syria	Cherbourg	Kent, British Columbia, Canada		
Bulus, Master Akar	9	Unknown	Syria	Cherbourg	Kent, British Columbia, Canada		
Bulus, Miss Nur-al-Ayn	7	Unknown	Syria	Cherbourg	Kent, British Columbia, Canada		
Burke, Mr. Jeremiah	19	Glanmire, Cork	Ireland	Queenstown	Charlestown, US		
Burns, Miss Mary Delia	17	Kilmacowen, Sligo	Ireland	Queenstown	New York City		
Butrus-Youssef, Mrs. Katarin (née Rizk)	24	Sar'al	Syria	Cherbourg	Detroit, Michigan, US	C	
Butrus-Youssef, Master Makhkhul	4	Sar'al	Syria	Cherbourg	Detroit, Michigan, US	D	
Butrus-Youssef, Miss Marianna	2	Sar'al	Syria	Cherbourg	Detroit, Michigan, US	C	
Čačić, Mr. Jego Grga	18	Široka Kula	Croatia	Southampton	Chicago, Illinois, US		
Čačić, Mr. Luka	38	Široka Kula	Croatia	Southampton	Chicago, Illinois, US		
Čačić, Miss Marija	30	Široka Kula	Croatia	Southampton	Chicago, Illinois, US		
Čačić, Miss Manda	21	Široka Kula	Croatia	Southampton	Chicago, Illinois, US		
Čalić, Mr. Jovo	17	Brezik	Croatia	Southampton	Sault Ste. Marie, Michigan, US		
Čalić, Mr. Petar	17	Brezik	Croatia	Southampton	Sault Ste. Marie, Michigan, US		
Canavan, Miss Mary	22	Tonacrick, Clare	Ireland	Queenstown	Philadelphia, Pennsylvania, US		
Canavan, Mr. Patrick "Peter"	21	Knockmaria, Mayo	Ireland	Queenstown	Philadelphia, Pennsylvania, US		
Cann, Mr. Ernest Charles	21	Penwithick, Cornwall	England	Southampton	New York City		
Caram, Mr. Joseph	28	Kfar Mechi	Syria	Cherbourg	Ottawa, Ontario, Canada		28^{MB}
Caram, Mrs. Maria (née Elias)	18	Kfar Mechi	Syria	Cherbourg	Ottawa, Ontario, Canada		
Carlsson, Mr. Carl Robert	24	Göteborg, Västergötland	Sweden	Southampton	Huntley, Illinois, US		
Carlsson, Mr. August Sigfrid	24	Dagsås, Halland	Sweden	Southampton	Tower, Minnesota, US		
Carr, Miss Jane	47	Aclare, Sligo	Ireland	Queenstown	Hartford, Connecticut, US		
Carver, Mr. Alfred John	28	Southampton, Hampshire	England	Southampton	New York City		
Celotti, Mr. Francesco	24	Milan	Italy	Southampton			
Chang, Mr. Chip	32	Hong Kong	China	Southampton	New York City	C	
Charters, Mr. David	28	Ballinalee, Longford	Ireland	Queenstown	New York City		
Cheong, Mr. Foo	32	Hong Kong	China	Southampton	New York City	10/13	
Christmann, Mr. Emil	29	London	England	Southampton	New York City		
Chronopoulos, Mr. Apostolos	26	Agios Sostis, Peloponnese	Greece	Cherbourg	New York City		
Chronopoulos, Mr. Dimitrios	18	Agios Sostis, Peloponnese	Greece	Cherbourg	New York City		
Coelho, Mr. Domingos Fernandes	20	Funchal, Madeira	Portugal	Southampton	New York City		
Cohen, Mr. Gershon "Gus"	18	London	England	Southampton	Brooklyn, New York, US	12	
Colbert, Mr. Patrick	24	Kilkinlea, Limerick	Ireland	Queenstown	Sherbrooke, Quebec, Canada		
Coleff, Mr. Fotio	24	Debnevo, Troyan	Bulgaria	Southampton	Chicago, Illinois, US		
Coltcheff, Mr. Peju	36	Gumostnik, Lovec	Bulgaria	Southampton	Chicago, Illinois, US		
Conlon, Mr. Thomas Henry	31	Philadelphia, Pennsylvania	US	Queenstown	Philadelphia, Pennsylvania, US		
Connaghton, Mr. Michael	31	Brooklyn, New York	US	Queenstown	Brooklyn, New York, US		
Connolly, Miss Catherine "Kate"	35	Bank Place, Tipperary	Ireland	Queenstown	Dobbs Ferry, New York, US		
Connolly, Miss Katherine "Kate"	22	Cortrasna, Cavan	Ireland	Queenstown	New York City	13	
Connors, Mr. Patrick John	61	Charleville, Cork	Ireland	Queenstown	New York City		171^{MB}
Cook, Mr. Jacob (Kukk, Mr. Jakob?)	43	Unknown (Estonia?)	Russia (Estonia?)	Southampton	New York City		
Čor, Mr. Bartol	35	Kricina	Croatia	Southampton	Great Falls, Montana, US		
Čor, Mr. Ivan	27	Kricina	Croatia	Southampton	Great Falls, Montana, US		
Čor, Mr. Liudevit	19	Kricina	Croatia	Southampton	Great Falls, Montana, US		
Corn, Mr. Henry "Harry"	30	London	England	Southampton	New York City		
Corr, Miss Helen	16	Corglass, Longford	Ireland	Queenstown	New York City	16	
Coutts, Mrs. Mary Winnie (née Trainer)	36	London	England	Southampton	Brooklyn, New York, US	2	
Coutts, Master William Loch "Willie"	9	London	England	Southampton	Brooklyn, New York, US	2	
Coutts, Master Neville Leslie	3	London	England	Southampton	Brooklyn, New York, US	2	
Coxon, Mr. Daniel	59	London	England	Southampton	Merrill, Wisconsin, US		
Crease, Mr. Ernest James	19	Bristol, Avon	England	Southampton	Cleveland, Ohio, US		
Cribb, Mr. John Hatfield	44	Bournemouth, Dorset	England	Southampton	Newark, New Jersey, US		
Cribb, Miss Laura Mae	16	Bournemouth, Dorset	England	Southampton	Newark, New Jersey, US	12	
Čulumović, Mr. Jeso	17	Lipova Glavica	Croatia	Southampton	Hammond, Indiana, US		
Dahir, Mr. Tannous	28	Beirut	Syria	Cherbourg	Youngstown, Ohio, US		
Dahl, Mr. Charles Edward	45	Adelaide, South Australia	Australia	Southampton	Fingal, North Dakota, US	15	
Dahlberg, Miss Gerda Ulrika	22	Stockholm	Sweden	Southampton	Chicago, Illinois, US		
Dakić, Mr. Branko	19	Gornji Miholjac	Croatia	Southampton	New York City		
Daly, Miss Margaret "Maggie"	30	Athlone, Westmeath	Ireland	Queenstown	New York City	15	
Daly, Mr. Eugene Patrick	29	Athlone, Westmeath	Ireland	Queenstown	New York City	B	
Danbom, Mr. Ernst Gilbert	34	Göteborg, Västergötland	Sweden	Southampton	Stanton, Iowa, US		197^{MB}
Danbom, Mrs. Anna Sigrid Maria (née Brogren)	28	Göteborg, Västergötland	Sweden	Southampton	Stanton, Iowa, US		
Danbom, Master Gilbert Sigvard Emanuel	4 mo.	Göteborg, Västergötland	Sweden	Southampton	Stanton, Iowa, US		
Danoff, Mr. Yoto	27	Unknown	Bulgaria	Southampton	Chicago, Illinois, US		
Dantcheff, Mr. Ristju	25	Terziysko, Troyan	Bulgaria	Southampton	Chicago, Illinois, US		
Davies, Mr. Evan	22	Pontardawe, West Glamorgan	Wales	Southampton	Pontiac, Michigan, US		
Davies, Mr. Alfred John	24	West Bromwich, Staffordshire	England	Southampton	Pontiac, Michigan, US		
Davies, Mr. John Samuel	21	West Bromwich, Staffordshire	England	Southampton	Pontiac, Michigan, US		
Davies, Mr. Joseph	17	West Bromwich, Staffordshire	England	Southampton	Pontiac, Michigan, US		
Davison, Mr. Thomas Henry "Harry"	32	Liverpool, Merseyside	England	Southampton	Bedford, Indiana, US		
Davison, Mrs. Mary Elizabeth	34	Liverpool, Merseyside	England	Southampson	Bedford, Indiana, US	16	
De Messemaeker, Mr. Guillaume Joseph	36	Tampico, Montana	US	Southampton	Tampico, Montana, US	15	
De Messemaeker, Mrs. Anna (née de Becker)	36	Tampico, Montana	US	Southampton	Tampico, Montana, US	13	
de Mulder, Mr. Theodoor	36	Aspelare, East Flanders	Belgium	Southampton	Detroit, Michigan, US	11	
de Pelsmaeker, Mr. Alfons	16	Heldergem, Haaltert, East Flanders	Belgium	Southampton	Gladstone, Michigan, US		
Dean, Mr. Bertram Frank	25	Bartley Farm, Hampshire	England	Southampton	Wichita, Kansas, US		
Dean, Mrs. Eva Georgetta (née Light)	32	Bartley Farm, Hampshire	England	Southampton	Wichita, Kansas, US	10	
Dean, Master Bertram Vere	1	Bartley Farm, Hampshire	England	Southampton	Wichita, Kansas, US	10	
Dean, Miss Elizabeth Gladys "Millvina"	2 mo.	Bartley Farm, Hampshire	England	Southampton	Wichita, Kansas, US	10	
Delalić, Mr. Redjo	25	Bakić	Bosnia	Southampton	Harrisburg, Pennsylvania, US		
Denkoff, Mr. Mitto	30	Unknown	Bulgaria	Southampton	Coon Rapids, Iowa, US		
Dennis, Mr. William	26	Week St Mary, Cornwall	England	Southampton	Saskatoon, Saskatchewan, Canada		
Dennis, Mr. Samuel	22	Week St Mary, Cornwall	England	Southampton	Saskatoon, Saskatchewan, Canada		
Devaney, Miss Margaret Delia	19	Kilmacowen, Sligo	Ireland	Queenstown	New York City	C	
Dika, Mr. Mirko	17	Podgora	Croatia	Southampton	Vancouver, British Columbia, Canada		
Dimić, Mr. Jovan	42	Ostrovica	Croatia	Southampton	Red Lodge, Montana, US		
Dintcheff, Mr. Valtcho	43	Unknown	Bulgaria	Southampton	Tulsa, Oklahoma, US		
Donohoe, Miss Bridget	21	Cum, Mayo	Ireland	Queenstown	Chicago, Illinois, US		
Dooley, Mr. Patrick J.	43	Patrickswell, Limerick	Ireland	Queenstown	New York City		
Dorking, Mr. Edward Arthur	18	Liss, Hampshire	England	Southampton	Oglesby, Illinois, US	B	
Doherty, Mr. William John (aka "James Moran")	22	Cork	Ireland	Queenstown	New York City		
Dowdell, Miss Elizabeth	31	New York City, New York	US	Southampton	New York City	13	
Doyle, Miss Elizabeth	24	Bree, Wexford	Ireland	Queenstown	New York City		
Draženović, Mr. Jozef	33	Hrastelnica	Croatia	Cherbourg	New York City		51^{MB}
Dropkin, Miss Jennie	24	Mogilev	Belarus	Southampton	New York City	13	
Duquemin, Mr. Joseph Pierre	19	Saint Sampson, Guernsey, Channel Islands	England	Southampton	Albion, New York, US	D	
Dwan, Mr. Frank	65	Bunmahon, Waterford	Ireland	Queenstown	Morris Plains, New Jersey, US		
Dyker, Mr. Adolf Fredrik	23	New Haven, Connecticut	US	Southampton	New Haven, Connecticut, US		
Dyker, Mrs. Anna Elisabeth Judith (née Andersson)	22	New Haven, Connecticut	US	Southampton	New Haven, Connecticut, US	16	
Edvardsson, Mr. Gustaf Hjalmar	18	Tofta, Uppland	Sweden	Southampton	Joliet, Illinois, US		
Eklund, Mr. Hans Linus	16	Kårberg, Örebro	Sweden	Southampton	Jerome Junction, Arizona, US		
Ekström, Mr. Johan	45	Effington Rut, South Dakota	US	Southampton	Effington Rut, South Dakota, US		
Elias, Mr. Dibo	29	Unknown	Syria	Cherbourg	New York City		
Elias, Mr. Joseph Jr.	15	Kafr Mishki, Syria	Syria	Cherbourg	Ottawa, Ontario, Canada		
Elias Nasrallah, Mr. Tannous	17	Kafr Mishki, Syria	Syria	Cherbourg	Ottawa, Ontario, Canada		
Elsbury, Mr. William James	47	Taunton, Somerset	England	Southampton	Gurnee, Illinois, US		
Emanuel, Miss Virginia Ethel	6	New York City, New York	US	Southampton	New York City	13	
Estanislau, Mr. Manuel Gonçalves	37	Calheta, Madeira	Portugal	Southampton	New York City		
Everett, Mr. Thomas James	39	Bristol, Avon	England	Southampton	Troy, New York, US		187^{MB}
Fardon, Mr. Charles R.(alias Charles Franklin)	38	Wellingborough, Northamptonshire	England	Cherbourg	Canada		
Farrell, Mr. James "Jim"	25	Killoe, Longford	Ireland	Queenstown	New York City		68^{MB}
Finoli, Mr. Luigi	34	Philadelphia, Pennsylvania	US	Southampton	Philadelphia, Pennsylvania, US	15	
Fischer, Mr. Eberhard Thelander	18	Björkeberga, Skåne	Sweden	Southampton	New York City		
Fleming, Miss Honora "Nora"	22	Carrowskehine, Mayo	Ireland	Queenstown	New York City		
Flynn, Mr. James	28	Cuilkillew, Mayo	Ireland	Queenstown	New York City		
Flynn, Mr. John	42	Clonbur, Galway	Ireland	Queenstown	Pittsburgh, Pennsylvania, US		
Foley, Mr. Joseph	19	Broadford, Limerick	Ireland	Queenstown	Larchmont, New York, US		
Foley, Mr. William	20	Donoughmore, Cork	Ireland	Queenstown	New York City		
Fong, Mr. Wing Sun (alias Fang Lang)	17	Hong Kong	China	Southampton	New York City	14	
Ford, Mr. Arthur	22	Bridgwater, Somerset	England	Southampton	Elmira, New York, US		
Ford, Mrs. Margaret Ann (née Watson)	48	Rotherfield, East Sussex	England	Southampton	Essex County, New Jersey, US		
Ford, Miss Dollina Margaret	20	Rotherfield, East Sussex	England	Southampton	Essex County, New Jersey, US		
Ford, Mr. Edward Watson	18	Rotherfield, East Sussex	England	Southampton	Essex County, New Jersey, US		
Ford, Mr. William Neal Thomas	16	Rotherfield, East Sussex	England	Southampton	Essex County, New Jersey, US		
Ford, Miss Robina Maggie	7	Rotherfield, East Sussex	England	Southampton	Essex County, New Jersey, US		
Fox, Mr. Patrick	28	Mullingar, Westmeath	Ireland	Queenstown	New York City		
Gallagher, Mr. Martin	29	Caltra, Galway	Ireland	Queenstown	New York City		
Garfirth, Mr. John	21	Wollaston, Northamptonshire	England	Southampton	Kitchener, Ontario, Canada		
Gerios Thamah, Mr. Assaf	21	Kafr Mishki	Syria	Cherbourg	Ottawa, Ontario, Canada		
Gheorgheff, Mr. Stanio	–	Unknown	Bulgaria	Cherbourg	Butte, Montana, US		
Gilinski, Mr. Eliezer	22	Ignalina	Lithuania	Southampton	Chicago, Illinois, US		47^{MB}
Gilnagh, Miss Mary Katherine "Katie"	17	Esker, Longford	Ireland	Queenstown	New York City	16	
Glynn, Miss Mary Agatha	19	Killaloe, Clare	Ireland	Queenstown	Washington, DC, US	13	
Goldsmith, Mr. Frank John	33	Strood, Kent	England	Southampton	Detroit, Michigan, US		
Goldsmith, Mrs. Emily Alice (née Brown)	31	Strood, Kent	England	Southampton	Detroit, Michigan, US	C	
Goldsmith, Master Frank John William	9	Strood, Kent	England	Southampton	Detroit, Michigan, US	C	
Goldsmith, Mr. Nathan	41	Unknown	Russia	Southampton	Philadelphia, Pennsylvania, US		
Goodwin, Mr. Frederick Joseph	42	Fulham	England	Southampton	Niagara Falls, New York, US		
Goodwin, Mrs. Augusta (née Tyler)	43	Fulham	England	Southampton	Niagara Falls, New York, US		
Goodwin, Miss Lillian Amy	16	Fulham	England	Southampton	Niagara Falls, New York, US		
Goodwin, Mr. Charles Edward	14	Fulham	England	Southampton	Niagara Falls, New York, US		
Goodwin, Master William Frederick	13	Fulham	England	Southampton	Niagara Falls, New York, US		
Goodwin, Miss Jessie Allis Mary	12	Fulham	England	Southampton	Niagara Falls, New York, US		
Goodwin, Master Harold Victor	10	Fulham	England	Southampton	Niagara Falls, New York, US		
Goodwin, Master Sidney Leslie	1	Fulham	England	Southampton	Niagara Falls, New York, US		4^{MB}
Green, Mr. George Henry	40	Dorking, Surrey	England	Southampton	Lead, South Dakota, US		
Grønnestad, Mr. Daniel Danielsen	32	Bokn	Norway	Southampton	Portland, North Dakota, US		
Guest, Mr. Robert	32	London	England	Southampton	Clinton, New York, US		
Gustafsson, Mr. Alfred Ossian	19	Kokkola	Finland	Southampton	Waukegan, Illinois, US		
Gustafsson, Mr. Anders Vilhelm	37	Ruotsinpyhtää	Finland	Southampton	New York City		98^{MB}
Gustafsson, Mr. Johan Birger	28	Ruotsinpyhtää	Finland	Southampton	New York City		
Gustafsson, Mr. Karl Gideon	19	Myren, Synnerby, Västergötland	Sweden	Southampton	Aberdeen, South Dakota, US		
Haas, Miss Aloisia	24	Altdorf, Uri	Switzerland	Southampton	Chicago, Illinois, US		
Hagland, Mr. Ingvald Olai Olsen	28	Skåre, Haugesund	Norway	Southampton	Belmar, New Jersey, US		
Hagland, Mr. Konrad Mathias Reiersen	19	Skåre, Haugesund	Norway	Southampton	Belmar, New Jersey, US		
Hakkarainen, Mr Pekka Pietari	28	Helsinki	Finland	Southampton	Monessen, Pennsylvania, US		
Hakkarainen, Mrs. Elin Matilda (née Dolck)	24	Helsinki	Finland	Southampton	Monessen, Pennsylvania, US	15	
Hampe, Mr. Léon Jérome	19	Westrozebeke	Belgium	Southampton	Detroit, Michigan, US		
Hanna, Mr. Borak Suleiman	27	Hardîne	Syria	Cherbourg	Wilkes-Barre, Pennsylvania, US	15	
Hanna, Mr. Bulus	18	Kfar Mechi	Syria	Cherbourg	Ottawa, Ontario, Canada		
Hanna, Mr. Mansur	35	Kfar Mechi	Syria	Cherbourg	Ottawa, Ontario, Canada		188^{MB}
Hansen, Mr. Claus Peter	41	Racine, Wisconsin	US	Southampton	Racine, Wisconsin, US		
Hansen, Mrs. Jennie Louise (née Howard)	45	Racine, Wisconsin	US	Southampton	Racine, Wisconsin, US	11	
Hansen, Mr. Henrik Juul	26	Holeby, Storstrøm	Denmark	Southampton	Racine, Wisconsin, US		
Hansen, Mr. Henry Damsgaard	21	Copenhagen	Denmark	Southampton	Racine, Wisconsin, US		69^{MB}
Hargadon, Miss Catherine "Kate"	17	Ballysadare, Sligo	Ireland	Queenstown	New York City		
Harknett, Miss Alice Phoebe	21	Thornton Heath, London	England	Southampton	New London, Connecticut, US		
Hart, Mr. Henry John	27	Ballysadare, Sligo	Ireland	Queenstown	Boston, Massachusetts, US		
Healy, Miss Hanora (Nora)	29	Athenry, Galway	Ireland	Queenstown	New York City	16	
Hedman, Mr. Oskar Arvid	27	St. Paul, Minnesota	US	Southampton	St. Paul, Minnesota, US	15	
Hegarty, Miss Hanora "Nora"	18	Whitechurch, Cork	Ireland	Queenstown	Charlestown, US		
Heikkinen, Miss Laina	26	Jyväskylä	Finland	Southampton	New York City	14?	
Heininen, Miss Wendla Maria	23	Turku	Finland	Southampton	New York City		8^{MB}
Hellström, Miss Hilda Maria	22	Stora Tuna	Sweden	Southampton	Evanston, Illinois, US	C	
Hendeković, Mr. Ignjac	28	Vagovina	Croatia	Southampton	Harrisburg, Pennsylvania, US		306^{MB}
Henriksson, Miss Jenny Lovisa	28	Stockholm	Sweden	Southampton	Iron Mountain, Michigan, US		3^{MB}
Henry, Miss Bridget Delia	23	Clonown, Roscommon	Ireland	Queenstown	Boston, Massachusetts, US		
Hing, Mr. Lee	24	Hong Kong	China	Southampton	New York City	C	
Hirvonen, Mrs. Helga Elisabeth (née Lindqvist)	22	Dalsbruk	Finland	Southampton	Monessen, Pennsylvania, US	15	
Hirvonen, Miss Hildur Elisabeth	2	Dalsbruk	Finland	Southampton	Monessen, Pennsylvania, US	15	
Holm, Mr. Johan Fredrik Alexander	43	Karlshamn, Blekinge	Sweden	Southampton	New York City		
Holten, Mr. Johan Martin	28	Bergen	Norway	Southampton	New York City		
Honkanen, Miss Eliina	27	Saarijärvi	Finland	Southampton	New York City	?	
Horgan, Mr. John	22	Unknown	Ireland	Queenstown	New York City		
Howard, Miss May Elizabeth	27	North Walsham, Norfolk	England	Southampton	Albion, Michigan, US	C	
Humblen, Mr. Adolf Mathias Nicolai Olsen	42	Borgund, Møre og Romsdal	Norway	Southampton	Milwaukee, Wisconsin, US		
Husayn, Master Husayn Mahumud	11	Fredericksburg, Virginia	US	Cherbourg	Fredericksburg, Virginia, US		
Hyman, Mr. Joseph Abraham	34	Manchester	England	Southampton	Springfield, Massachusetts, US	13	
Ilmakangas, Miss Ida Livija	27	New York City, New York	US	Southampton	New York City		
Ilmakangas, Miss Pieta Sofia	25	Paavola, Northern Ostrobothnia	Finland	Southampton	New York City		
Ivanoff, Mr. Kanio	20	Malka Ribnya, Troyan	Bulgaria	Southampton	Chicago, Illinois, US		
Jabbour, Miss Hileni	16	Unknown	Syria	Cherbourg	New York City		328^{MM}
Jabbour, Miss Tamini	19	Unknown	Syria	Cherbourg	New York City		
Jalševac, Mr. Ivan	29	Topolovac	Croatia	Cherbourg	Galesburg, Illinois, US	15	
Jansson, Mr. Carl Olof	21	Örebro	Sweden	Southampton	Swedeburg, Nebraska, US	A	
Jardim, Mr. José Neto	21	Calheta, Madeira	Portugal	Southampton	New York City		
Jensen, Mr. Hans Peder	20	Eskilstrup	Denmark	Southampton	Portland, Oregon, US		
Jensen, Mr. Niels Peder "Rasmus"	48	Portland, Oregon	US	Southampton	Portland, Oregon, US		
Jensen, Mr. Svend Lauritz	17	Eskilstrup	Denmark	Southampton	Portland, Oregon, US		
Jermyn, Miss Annie Jane	26	Ballydehob, Cork	Ireland	Queenstown	East Lynn, Massachusetts, US	D	
Jirjis, Mrs. Shaniini (née Whabee Abi-Saab)	22	Youngstown, Ohio	US	Cherbourg	Youngstown, Ohio, US	C	
Johannesen, Mr. Bernt Johannes	29	Avaldsnes, Stavanger	Norway	Southampton	New York City	13	
Johanson, Mr. Jakob Alfred	34	Munsala	Finland	Southampton	Vancouver, British Columbia, Canada		143^{MB}
Johansson, Mr. Erik	22	Frostensmåla, Småland	Sweden	Southampton	St. Paul, Minnesota, US		156^{MB}
Johansson, Mr. Gustaf Joel	33	Bäckebo, Småland	Sweden	Southampton	Cheyenne, North Dakota, US		285^{MB}
Johansson, Mr. Karl Johan	31	Duluth, Minnesota	US	Southampton	Duluth, Minnesota, US		
Johansson, Mr. Nils	29	Chicago, Illinois	US	Southampton	Chicago, Illinois, US		
Johansson Palmquist, Mr. Oskar Leander	26	Kvarnaryd, Småland	Sweden	Southampton	New Haven, Connecticut, US	15	
Johansson, Mr. Oskar Wilhelm	32	Lunna, Orust Island	Sweden	Southampton	Manitowoc, Wisconsin, US	?	
Johnson, Mr. Alfred	49	Millwood	England	Southampton	New York City		
Johnson, Mrs. Elisabeth Vilhelmina (née Berg)	26	St. Charles, Illinois	US	Southampton	St. Charles, Illinois, US	15	
Johnson, Master Harold Theodor	4	St. Charles, Illinois	US	Southampton	St. Charles, Illinois, US	15	
Johnson, Miss Eleanor Ileen	1	St. Charles, Illinois	US	Southampton	St. Charles, Illinois, US	15	
Johnson, Mr. Malkolm Joackim	33	Minneapolis, Minnesota	US	Southampton	Minneapolis, Minnesota, US		37^{MB}
Johnson, Mr. William Cahoone Jr.	19	Hawthorne, New Jersey	US	Southampton	New York City		
Johnston, Mr. Andrew Emslie	35	Thornton Heath, London	England	Southampton	New London, Connecticut, US		
Johnston, Mrs. Elizabeth (née Watson) "Eliza"	34	Thornton Heath, London	England	Southampton	New London, Connecticut, US		
Johnston, Master William Andrew	8	Thornton Heath, London	England	Southampton	New London, Connecticut, US		
Johnston, Miss Catherine Nellie	7	Thornton Heath, London	England	Southampton	New London, Connecticut, US		
Jonkoff, Mr. Lalju	23	Gumostnik, Lovec	Bulgaria	Southampton	Chicago, Illinois, US		
Jonsson, Mr. Carl	32	Kalfsnäs, Småland	Sweden	Southampton	Huntley, Illinois, US	15	
Jönsson, Mr. Nils Hilding	27	Tågarp, Skåne	Sweden	Southampton	New York City		
Jussila, Mr. Eiriik	32	Elimäki	Finland	Southampton	Monessen, Pennsylvania, US	15	
Jussila, Miss Katriina	20	Paavola, Northern Ostrobothnia	Finland	Southampton	New York City		
Jussila, Miss Mari Aina	21	Paavola, Northern Ostrobothnia	Finland	Southampton	New York City		
Kallio, Mr. Nikolai Erlantti	17	Kauhajoki	Finland	Southampton	Sudbury, Ontario, Canada		
Kalvik, Mr. Johannes Halvorsen	21	Etnesjøen, Hordaland	Norway	Southampton	Story City, Iowa, US		
Karajić, Mr. Milan	30	Vagovina	Croatia	Southampton	Youngstown, Ohio, US		
Karlsson, Mr. Einar Gervasius	21	Oskarshamn, Kalmar	Sweden	Southampton	Brooklyn, New York, US	13	
Karlsson, Mr. Julius Konrad Eugen	33	Göteborg, Västergötland	Sweden	Southampton	New York City		
Karlsson, Mr. Nils August	22	Örebro	Sweden	Southampton	Palmer, Massachusetts, US		
Karun, Mr. Franz	39	Milje	Slovenia	Southampton	Galesburg, Illinois, US	15	
Karun, Miss Manca ("Anna")	4	Milje	Slovenia	Southampton	Galesburg, Illinois, US	15	
Katavolos, Mr. Vassilios G.	19	Agios Sostis	Greece	Cherbourg	Milwaukee, Wisconsin, US		58^{MB}
Keane, Mr. Andrew "Andy"	23	Athenry, Galway	Ireland	Queenstown	Auburndale, Massachusetts, US		
Keefe, Mr. Arthur	39	Rahway, New Jersey	US	Southampton	Rahway, New Jersey, US		
Kelly, Mr. James	19	Carluke, Lanarkshire	Scotland	Southampton	New York City		
Kelly, Mr. James	44	Leixlip, Kildare	Ireland	Queenstown	New Haven, Connecticut, US		
Kelly, Miss Anna Katherine	20	Cuilmullagh, Mayo	Ireland	Queenstown	Chicago, Illinois, US	16	
Kelly, Miss Mary	22	Castlepollard, Westmeath	Ireland	Queenstown	New York City	D	
Kennedy, Mr. John Joseph	24	Watergate, Limerick	Ireland	Queenstown	New York City	15?	
Khalil-Khoury, Mr. Butrus	25	Hardîne	Syria	Cherbourg	Wilkes Barre, Pennsylvania, US		
Khalil-Khoury, Mrs. Zahie "Maria"	20	Hardîne	Syria	Cherbourg	Wilkes Barre, Pennsylvania, US		
Kiernan, Mr. John Joseph	24	Jersey City, New Jersey	US	Queenstown	Jersey City, New Jersey, US		
Kiernan, Mr. Philip	22	Aughnacliffe, Longford	Ireland	Queenstown	Jersey City, New Jersey, US		
Kilgannon, Mr. Thomas	22	Currafarry, Galway	Ireland	Queenstown	New York City		
Kink, Mr. Anton	29	Zürich	Switzerland	Southampton	Milwaukee, Wisconsin	2	
Kink, Mrs. Luise (née Heilmann)	26	Zürich	Switzerland	Southampton	Milwaukee, Wisconsin	2	
Kink, Miss Luise Gretchen	4	Zürich	Switzerland	Southampton	Milwaukee, Wisconsin	2	
Kink, Miss Maria	22	Zürich	Switzerland	Southampton	Milwaukee, Wisconsin, US		
Kink, Mr. Vincenz	26	Zürich	Switzerland	Southampton	Milwaukee, Wisconsin, US		
Klasén, Mrs. Hulda Kristina Eugenia (née Lofqvist)	36	Salmunds, Gotland	Sweden	Southampton	Los Angeles, US		
Klasén, Mr. Klas Albin	18	Grimshut, Småland	Sweden	Southampton	New York City		
Klasén, Miss Gertrud Emilia	1	Grimshut, Småland	Sweden	Southampton	New York City		
Kraeff, Mr. Theodor	–	Vetren	Bulgaria	Cherbourg	Madison, Wisconsin, US		
Krekorian, Mr. Neshan	25	Kiğı	Turkey	Cherbourg	Brantford, Ontario, Canada	10	
Kutscher, Mr. Simon	26	Edinburgh	Scotland	Southampton	New York City		
Lahoud Ishaq Mowad, Mr. Sarkis	30	Zgharta	Syria	Cherbourg	Waterbury, Connecticut, US		
Laitinen, Miss Kristiina Sofia	37	Helsinki	Finland	Southampton	New York City		
Laleff, Mr. Kristo	23	Knezhni Lak, Troyan	Bulgaria	Southampton	Chicago, Illinois, US		
Lam, Mr. Ah	37	Hong Kong	China	Southampton	New York City	C	
Lam, Mr. Len	23	Hong Kong	China	Southampton	New York City	C	
Landergren, Miss Aurora Adelia	22	Karlshamn, Blekinge	Sweden	Southampton	New York City	13	
Lane, Mr. Patrick	16	Limerick, Limerick	Ireland	Queenstown	New York City		
Larsson, Mr. August Viktor	29	Stamford, Connecticut	US	Southampton	Stamford, Connecticut, US		
Larsson, Mr. Bengt Edvin	29	Nyköping, Södermanland	Sweden	Southampton	Hartford, Connecticut, US		
Larsson-Rondberg, Mr. Edvard A.	22	Lysvik, Värmland	Sweden	Southampton	Missoula, Montana, US		
Lee, Mr. Bing	32	Hong Kong	China	Southampton	New York City	C	
Lee, Mr. Ling	28	Hong Kong	China	Southampton	New York City		
Lefebvre, Mrs. Frances Marie-Anselme (née Daumont)	40	Liévin, Pas-de-Calais	France	Southampton	Mystic, Iowa, US		
Lefebvre, Miss Mathilde Franck-Marie-Joseph	12	Liévin, Pas-de-Calais	France	Southampton	Mystic, Iowa, US		
Lefebvre, Miss Jeannie Franck-Marie-Joseph	8	Liévin, Pas-de-Calais	France	Southampton	Mystic, Iowa, US		
Lefebvre, Master Henri Franck-Marie-Joseph	5	Liévin, Pas-de-Calais	France	Southampton	Mystic, Iowa, US		
Lefebvre, Miss Ida Franck-Marie-Joseph	3	Liévin, Pas-de-Calais	France	Southampton	Mystic, Iowa, US		
Leinonen, Mr. Antti Gustaf	32	Välitaipale	Finland	Southampton	New York City		
Lennon, Mr. Denis	20	Ballymahon, Longford	Ireland	Queenstown	New York City		
Lennon, Miss Mary	18	Ballymahon, Longford	Ireland	Queenstown	New York City		
Leonard, Mr. Lionel	36	New York City, New York	US	Southampton	New York City		
Lester, Mr. James	39	West Bromwich, Staffordshire	England	Southampton	Pontiac, Michigan, US		
Lievens, Mr. René Gustave Aimé	24	Haaltert	Belgium	Southampton	Detroit, Michigan, US		
Lindahl, Miss Agda Thorilda Viktoria	25	Stockholm	Sweden	Southampton	Saranac Lake, New York, US		
Lindblom, Miss Augusta Charlotta	45	Stockholm	Sweden	Southampton	Stratford, Connecticut, US		
Lindell, Mr. Edvard Bengtsson	36	Helsingborg, Skåne	Sweden	Southampton	Hartford, Connecticut, US	A (Note: The Lindells both reached Boat A but did not survive the night.)	
Lindell, Mrs. Elin Gerda (née Persson)	30	Helsingborg, Skåne	Sweden	Southampton	Hartford, Connecticut, US	A	
Lindqvist, Mr. Eino William	20	Dalsbruk	Finland	Southampton	Monessen, Pennsylvania, US	15	
Linehan, Mr. Michael	21	Boherbue, Cork	Ireland	Queenstown	New York City		
Linhart, Mr. Wenzel H.	27	Vienna	Austria	Southampton	New York City		298^{MB}
Livshin, Mr. David ("Abraham Harmer")	25	Manchester	England	Southampton	Montreal, Quebec, Canada		
Lobb, Mr. William Arthur	30	Scranton, Pennsylvania	US	Southampton	Scranton, Pennsylvania, US		
Lobb, Mrs. Cordelia K. (née Stanlick)	26	Scranton, Pennsylvania	US	Southampton	Scranton, Pennsylvania, US		55^{MB}
Lockyer, Mr. Edward Thomas	21	Sandhurst, Kent	England	Southampton	Ontario, New York, US		153^{MB}
Lovell, Mr. John Hall ("Henry")	20	Northlew, Devon	England	Southampton	New York City		
Lulić, Mr. Nikola	29	Konjsko Brdo	Croatia	Southampton	Chicago, Illinois, US	15	
Lundahl, Mr. Johan Svensson	51	Fyrnan, Småland	Sweden	Southampton	Spokane, Washington, US		
Lundström, Mr. Thure Edvin	32	Simrishamn, Skåne	Sweden	Southampton	Los Angeles, US	15	
Lymperopoulus, Mr. Panagiotis K.	30	Áyios Sóstis	Greece	Cherbourg	Stamford, Connecticut US		196^{MB}
Lyntakoff, Mr. Stanko	44	Unknown	Bulgaria	Southampton	Coon Rapids, Iowa, US		
Mackay, Mr. George William	20	London	England	Southampton	Rochester, New York, US		
Madigan, Miss Margaret "Maggie"	21	Askeaton, Limerick	Ireland	Queenstown	New York City	15	
Madsen, Mr. Fridtjof Arne	24	Trondheim	Norway	Southampton	Brooklyn, New York, US	13	
Mäenpää, Mr. Matti Alexanteri	22	Kauhajoki	Finland	Southampton	Sudbury, Ontario, Canada		
Mahon, Miss Bridget Delia	20	Derrymartin, Mayo	Ireland	Queenstown	New York City		
Maisner, Mr. Simon	34	London	England	Southampton	New York City		
Mäkinen, Mr. Kalle Edvard	29	Ikaalinen, Pirkanmaa	Finland	Southampton	Glassport, Pennsylvania, US		
Mamee, Mr. Hanna	20	Tripoli	Syria	Cherbourg	Philadelphia, Pennsylvania, US	15	
Mangan, Miss Mary	32	Carrowkehine, Mayo	Ireland	Queenstown	Chicago, Illinois, US		61^{MB}
Mannion, Miss Margaret	28	Caltra, Galway	Ireland	Queenstown	New York City	16	
Mardirosian, Mr. Sarkis	25	Kiğı	Turkey	Cherbourg	Brantford, Ontario, Canada		
Marinko, Mr. Dmitri	23	Unknown	Macedonia	Southampton	New York City		
Markoff, Mr. Marin	35	Gumostnik, Lovec	Bulgaria	Southampton	Chicago, Illinois, US		
Markun, Mr. Johann	33	Milje	Slovenia	Cherbourg	New York City		
Matinoff, Mr. Nicola	30	Gabrovo	Bulgaria	Cherbourg	Madison, Wisconsin, US		
McCarthy, Miss Catherine "Katie"	24	Tipperary	Ireland	Queenstown	Bayonne, New Jersey, US	15	
McCormack, Mr. Thomas Joseph	19	Bayonne, New Jersey	US	Queenstown	Guttenberg, New Jersey, US	15	
McCoy, Miss Catherine Agnes	29	Carrickatane, Tyrone	Ireland	Queenstown	Brooklyn, New York, US	16	
McCoy, Miss Alice	26	Carrickatane, Tyrone	Ireland	Queenstown	Brooklyn, New York, US	16	
McCoy, Mr. Bernard	24	Carrickatane, Tyrone	Ireland	Queenstown	Brooklyn, New York, US	16	
McDermott, Miss Bridget Delia	31	Lahardane, Mayo	Ireland	Queenstown	Chicago, Illinois, US	13	
McEvoy, Mr. Michael	19	Dublin	Ireland	Queenstown	New York City		
McGovern, Miss Mary	22	Corlough, Cavan	Ireland	Queenstown	New York City	13	
McGowan, Miss Anna F. "Annie"	17	Massbrook, Mayo	Ireland	Queenstown	Chicago, Illinois, US	13	
McGowan, Miss Catherine	42	Terry, Mayo	Ireland	Queenstown	Chicago, Illinois, US		
McMahon, Mr. Martin	20	Craghbrien, Clare	Ireland	Queenstown	New York City		
McNamee, Mr. Neal	27	Convoy, Donegal, Ireland	England	Southampton	Philadelphia, Pennsylvania, US		
McNamee, Mrs. Eileen (née O'Leary)	19	Salisbury, Wiltshire	England	Southampton	Philadelphia, Pennsylvania, US		53^{MB}
McNeill, Miss Bridget	27	Trien, Roscommon	Ireland	Queenstown	New York City		
Meanwell, Mrs. Mary Ann	63	Eastbourne, East Sussex	England	Southampton	New York City		
Meehan, Mr. John	22	Currowhunane, Sligo	Ireland	Queenstown	Paterson, New Jersey, US		
Meek, Mrs. Anna "Annie" Louise Rowley	31	Penarth, Glamorgan	Wales	Southampton	New York City		
Miesnere, Mr. Simon	34	London, England	England	Southampton	New York City		
Meo-Martino, Mr. Alfonzo	48	Bournemouth, Dorset	England	Southampton	Washington, DC, US		201^{MB}
Mernagh, Mr. John Robert	26	Ballywilliam, Wexford	Ireland	Queenstown	Chicago, Illinois, US		
Midtsjø, Mr. Karl Albert	21	Kråkstad, Ski	Norway	Southampton	Chicago, Illinois, US	15	
Mihoff, Mr. Stoytcho	28	Gumostnik, Lovec	Bulgaria	Southampton	Chicago, Illinois, US		
Miles, Mr. Frank	23	Greenwich, London	England	Southampton	New York City		
Mineff, Mr. Ivan	24	Unknown	Bulgaria	Southampton	Coon Rapids, Iowa, US		
Minkoff, Mr. Lazar	21	Gumostnik, Lovec	Bulgaria	Southampton	Chicago, Illinois, US		
Mitkoff, Mr. Mito	23	Unknown	Bulgaria	Southampton	Chicago, Illinois, US		
Mockler, Miss Ellen Mary	23	Currafarry, Galway	Ireland	Queenstown	New York City	16	
Moen, Mr. Sigurd Hansen	25	Bergen	Norway	Southampton	Minneapolis, Minnesota, US		309^{M}
Moor, Mrs. Beila	29	Unknown	Russia	Southampton	Chicago, Illinois, US	14	
Moor, Master Meier	7	Unknown	Russia	Southampton	Chicago, Illinois, US	14	
Moore, Mr. Leonard Charles	19	Kingston upon Thames, London	England	Southampton	Hoboken, New Jersey, US		
Moran, Miss Bertha Bridget	28	Askeaton, Limerick	Ireland	Queenstown	Brooklyn, New York, US	16	
Moran, Mr. Daniel James	27	Askeaton, Limerick	Ireland	Queenstown	Brooklyn, New York, US		
Morley, Mr. William	34	Petworth, West Sussex	England	Southampton	New York City		
Morrow, Mr. Thomas Rowan	30	Rathfriland, Down	Ireland	Queenstown	Gleichen, Alberta, Canada		
Moss, Mr. Albert Johan	29	Bergen	Norway	Southampton	New York City	?	
Moussa, Mrs. Mantoura	35	Hardîne	Syria	Cherbourg	Wilkes-Barre, Pennsylvania, US	?	
Moutal, Mr. Rahamin Haim	28	London	England	Southampton	New York City		
Mubarik, Mrs. Amanah Fa'ud (née Iskandar)	24	Hardîne	Syria	Cherbourg	Houtzdale, Pennsylvania, US	C	
Mubarik, Master Gerios	7	Hardîne	Syria	Cherbourg	Houtzdale, Pennsylvania, US	C	
Mubarik, Master Halim Gonios	4	Hardîne	Syria	Cherbourg	Houtzdale, Pennsylvania, US	C	
Mullen, Miss Katherine "Katie"	19	Esker, Longford	Ireland	Queenstown	New York City	16	
Mulvihill, Miss Bridget Elizabeth "Bertha"	25	Athlone, Westmeath	Ireland	Queenstown	Providence, Rhode Island, US	15	
Murdlin, Mr. Joseph	22	London	England	Southampton	New York City		
Murphy, Miss Catherine "Kate"	18	Aghnacliffe, Longford	Ireland	Queenstown	Philadelphia, Pennsylvania, US	16	
Murphy, Miss Margaret Jane "Maggie/Mary"	25	Fostragh, Longford	Ireland	Queenstown	Philadelphia, Pennsylvania, US	16	
Murphy, Miss Nora	34	Dublin	Ireland	Queenstown	New York City	16	
Muslamani, Mrs. Fatimah	22	Tebnine	Syria	Cherbourg	Michigan City, Indiana, US	C	
Myhrman, Mr. Pehr Fabian Oliver Malkolm	18	Kristinehamn, Värmland	Sweden	Southampton	Chicago, Illinois, US		
Nackid, Mr. Sahid	20	Zgharta	Syria	Cherbourg	Waterbury, Connecticut, US	C	
Nackid, Miss Waika "Mary" (née Mowad)	19	Zgharta	Syria	Cherbourg	Waterbury, Connecticut, US	C	
Nackid, Miss Maria	1	Zgharta	Syria	Cherbourg	Waterbury, Connecticut, US	C	
Naidenoff, Mr. Penko	22	Gumostnik, Lovech	Bulgaria	Southampton	Chicago, Illinois, US		
Nakli-Khoury, Mr. Toufik	17	Hardîne	Syria	Cherbourg	New York City		
Nancarrow, Mr. William Henry	33	St Austell, Cornwall	England	Southampton	Yonkers, New York, US		
Nankoff, Mr. Minko	32	Unknown	Bulgaria	Southampton	Chicago, Illinois, US		
Nasr Alma, Mr. Mustafa	20	Tebnine	Syria	Cherbourg	New York City		
Nassr Rizq, Mr. Saade	20	Sir'Al	Syria	Cherbourg	New York City		
Naughton, Miss Hannah	21	Donoughmore	Ireland	Queenstown	New York City		
Nenkoff, Mr. Christo	22	Unknown	Bulgaria	Southampton	Coon Rapids, Iowa, US		
Nieminen, Miss Manta Josefiina	29	Karinainen	Finland	Southampton	Aberdeen, Washington, US		
Niklasson, Mr. Samuel	28	Västra Bogane, Orust Island	Sweden	Southampton	New York City		
Nilsson, Mr. August Ferdinand	21	Hörby, Skåne	Sweden	Southampton	St. Paul, Minnesota, US		
Nilsson, Miss Berta Olivia	18	Lysvik, Värmland	Sweden	Southampton	Missoula, Montana, US	D	
Nilsson, Miss Helmina Josefina	26	Ramkvilla, Småland	Sweden	Southampton	Joliet, Illinois, US	13	
Niqula-Yarid, Miss Jamilah	14	El-Hakour	Syria	Cherbourg	Jacksonville, Florida, US	C	
Niqula-Yarid, Master Ilyas	12	El-Hakour	Syria	Cherbourg	Jacksonville, Florida, US	C	
Nirva, Mr. Iisakki Antino Äijö	41	Kauhajoki	Finland	Southampton	Sudbury, Ontario, Canada		
Niskanen, Mr. Juha	39	Kivijärvi	Finland	Southampton	Boston, Massachusetts, US	9	
Nofal, Mr. Mansur	20	Kafr Mishki	Syria	Cherbourg	Ottawa, Ontario, Canada		181^{MB}
Nosworthy, Mr. Richard Cater	21	Newton Abbot, Devon	England	Southampton	Buffalo, New York, US		
Nysten, Miss Anna Sofia	22	Kisa, Östergötland	Sweden	Southampton	Hackensack, New Jersey, US	13	
Nysveen, Mr. Johan Hansen	61	Øyer	Norway	Southampton	Grand Forks, North Dakota, US		
O'Brien, Mr. Thomas	27	Pallasgreen, Limerick	Ireland	Queenstown	Chicago, Illinois, US		
O'Brien, Mrs. Johanna "Hannah" (née Godfrey)	26	Pallasgreen, Limerick	Ireland	Queenstown	Chicago, Illinois, US	?	
O'Brien, Mr. Timothy	21	Drimoleague, Cork	Ireland	Queenstown	New York City		
O'Connell, Mr. Patrick Denis	17	Kingwilliamstown, Cork	Ireland	Queenstown	New York City		
O'Connor, Mr. Maurice	16	Boherbue, Cork	Ireland	Queenstown	New York City		
O'Connor, Mr. Patrick	23	Kingwilliamstown, Cork	Ireland	Queenstown	New York City		
O'Driscoll, Miss Bridget	24	Ballydehob, Cork	Ireland	Queenstown	Jersey City, New Jersey, US	D	
O'Dwyer, Miss Ellen "Nellie"	25	Limerick, Limerick	Ireland	Queenstown	New York City	10	
O'Keefe, Mr. Patrick	22	Waterford, Waterford	Ireland	Queenstown	New York City	B	
O'Leary, Miss Hanora "Nora"	16	Kingwilliamstown, Cork	Ireland	Queenstown	New York City	13	
O'Sullivan, Miss Bridget Mary	21	Glenduff, Kerry	Ireland	Queenstown	New York City		
Ödahl, Mr. Nils Martin	23	Örsjö, Kalmar	Sweden	Southampton	Peoria, Illinois, US		
Öhman, Miss Velin	22	Mariestad, Västergötland	Sweden	Southampton	Chicago, Illinois, US	C	
Olsen, Mr. Henry Margido	28	Bergen	Norway	Southampton	New York City		173^{MB}
Olsen, Mr. Karl Siegwart Andreas	42	Trondheim	Norway	Southampton	Brooklyn, New York, US		
Olsen, Master Arthur Carl	9	Trondheim	Norway	Southampton	Brooklyn, New York, US	13	
Olsen, Mr. Ole Martin	27	Sunnhordland	Norway	Southampton	Broderick, Canada		
Olsson, Miss Elina	31	Södra Brantevik	Sweden	Southampton	St. Paul, Minnesota, US		
Olsson, Mr. Nils Johan Göransson	28	Eslöv, Skåne	Sweden	Southampton	New York City		
Olsvingen, Mr. Thor Andersen	20	Vikersund	Norway	Southampton	Carneron, US		89^{MB}
Orešković, Miss Jelka	23	Konjsko Brdo	Croatia	Southampton	Chicago, Illinois, US		
Orešković, Mr. Luka	20	Konjsko Brdo	Croatia	Southampton	Chicago, Illinois, US		
Orešković, Miss Marija	20	Konjsko Brdo	Croatia	Southampton	Chicago, Illinois, US		
Osén, Mr. Olaf Elon	16	Hedesunda, Gävleborg	Sweden	Southampton	Mitchell, South Dakota, US		
Pålsson, Mrs. Alma Cornelia (née Berglund)	29	Bjuv, Skåne	Sweden	Southampton	Chicago, Illinois, US		206^{MB}
Pålsson, Miss Torborg Danira	8	Bjuv, Skåne	Sweden	Southampton	Chicago, Illinois, US		
Pålsson, Master Paul Folke	6	Bjuv, Skåne	Sweden	Southampton	Chicago, Illinois, US		
Pålsson, Miss Stina Viola	3	Bjuv, Skåne	Sweden	Southampton	Chicago, Illinois, US		
Pålsson, Master Gösta Leonard	2	Bjuv, Skåne	Sweden	Southampton	Chicago, Illinois, US		
Panula, Mrs. Maija Emelia Abrahamintytar (née Ketola-Ojala)	41	Ylihärmä, South Ostrobothnia	Finland	Southampton	Coal Center, Pennsylvania, US		
Panula, Mr. Ernesti Arvid	16	Ylihärmä, South Ostrobothnia	Finland	Southampton	Coal Center, Pennsylvania, US		
Panula, Mr. Jaakko Arnold	15	Ylihärmä, South Ostrobothnia	Finland	Southampton	Coal Center, Pennsylvania, US		
Panula, Master Juha Niilo	7	Ylihärmä, South Ostrobothnia	Finland	Southampton	Coal Center, Pennsylvania, US		
Panula, Master Urho Aaprami	2	Ylihärmä, South Ostrobothnia	Finland	Southampton	Coal Center, Pennsylvania, US		
Panula, Master Eino Viljami	1	Ylihärmä, South Ostrobothnia	Finland	Southampton	Coal Center, Pennsylvania, US		
Pašič, Mr. Jakov	21	Streklevac	Slovenia	Southampton	Aurora, Illinois, US		
Patchett, Mr. George	19	Wollaston, Northamptonshire	England	Southampton	Kitchener, Ontario, Canada		
Pavlović, Mr. Štefo	32	Vagovina	Croatia	Southampton	Harrisburg, Pennsylvania, US		
Peacock, Mrs. Edith (née Nile)	26	Southampton, Hampshire	England	Southampton	Elizabeth, New Jersey, US		
Peacock, Miss Treasteall	4	Southampton, Hampshire	England	Southampton	Elizabeth, New Jersey, US		
Peacock, Master Albert Edward	7 mo.	Southampton, Hampshire	England	Southampton	Elizabeth, New Jersey, US		
Pearce, Mr. Ernest	32	London	England	Southampton	New York City		
Pedersen, Mr. Olaf	28	Sandefjord	Norway	Southampton	Seattle, Washington, US		
Peduzzi, Mr. Giuseppe	24	London	England	Southampton	New York City		
Pekoniemi, Mr. Edvard Johannes	21	Heinola	Finland	Southampton	New York City		
Peltomäki, Mr. Nikolai Johannes	25	Helsinki	Finland	Southampton	New York City		
Perkin, Mr. John Henry	22	Holsworthy, Devon	England	Southampton	Saskatoon, Saskatchewan, Canada		
Persson, Mr. Ernst Ulrik	25	Stockholm, Uppland	Sweden	Southampton	Indianapolis, Indiana, US	15	
Peters, Miss Catherine "Katie"	26	Cahir, Tipperary	Ireland	Queenstown	New York City		
Petranec, Miss Matilda	28	Vagovina	Croatia	Southampton	Harrisburg, Pennsylvania, US		
Petroff, Mr. Nadjalko	19	Gumostnik, Lovec	Bulgaria	Southampton	Chicago, Illinois, US		
Petroff, Mr. Pastcho	29	Belish, Troyan	Bulgaria	Southampton	Chicago, Illinois, US		
Pettersson, Miss Ellen Natalia	18	Stockholm, Uppland	Sweden	Southampton	Iron Mountain, Michigan, US		
Pettersson, Mr. Johan Emil	25	Västermo, Södermanland	Sweden	Southampton	Chicago, Illinois, US		
Pickard, Mr. Berk (Trembisky)	32	Warsaw	Poland	Southampton	San Francisco, US	9	
Plotcharsky, Mr. Vasil	27	Unknown	Bulgaria	Southampton	Tulsa, Oklahoma, US		
Pocrnić, Mr. Mate	17	Bukovac	Croatia	Southampton	Chicago, Illinois, US		
Pocrnić, Mr. Tome	24	Bukovac	Croatia	Southampton	Chicago, Illinois, US		
Pullner, Mr. Uscher	16	Unknown	Unknown	Cherbourg	New York City		
Radeff, Mr. Alexander	27	Unknown	Bulgaria	Southampton	Chicago, Illinois, US		
Rasmussen, Mrs. Lena Jakobsen (née Solvang)	62	Haugesund, Hordaland	Norway	Southampton	Centerville, South Dakota, US		
Razi, Mr. Raihed	30	Tebnine	Syria	Southampton	New York City		
Reed, Mr. James George	19	Penarth, Glamorgan	Wales	Southampton	New York City		
Rekić, Mr. Tido	38	Bosanska Krupa	Bosnia	Southampton	Harrisburg, Pennsylvania, US		
Reynolds, Mr. Harold J.	21	London	England	Southampton	Toronto, Ontario, Canada		327^{MM}
Rice, Mrs. Margaret (née Norton)	39	Athlone, Westmeath	Ireland	Queenstown	Spokane, Washington, US		12^{MB}
Rice, Master Albert	10	Athlone, Westmeath	Ireland	Queenstown	Spokane, Washington, US		
Rice, Master George Hugh	8	Athlone, Westmeath	Ireland	Queenstown	Spokane, Washington, US		
Rice, Master Frederick Thomas "Eric"	7	Athlone, Westmeath	Ireland	Queenstown	Spokane, Washington, US		
Rice, Master Arthur	4	Athlone, Westmeath	Ireland	Queenstown	Spokane, Washington, US		
Rice, Master Eugene Francis	2	Athlone, Westmeath	Ireland	Queenstown	Spokane, Washington, US		
Riihivuori, Miss Susanna Juhantytär "Sanni"	22	Ylihärmä, South Ostrobothnia	Finland	Southampton	Coal Center, Pennsylvania, US		
Rintamäki, Mr. Matti	35	Kyyny	Finland	Southampton	Sudbury, Ontario, Canada		
Riordan, Miss Hannah	18	Glenlougha, Cork	Ireland	Queenstown	New York City	13	
Risien, Mr. Samuel Beard	69	Deal, Kent	England	Southampton	Groesbeck, Texas, US		
Risien, Mrs. Emma Jane (née Lellyet)	58	Durban	South Africa	Southampton	Groesbeck, Texas, US		
Robins, Mr. Alexander A.	50	St Austell, Cornwall	England	Southampton	Yonkers, New York, US		119^{MB}
Robins, Mrs. Grace Charity (née Laury)	47	St Austell, Cornwall	England	Southampton	Yonkers, New York, US		7^{MB}
Rogers, Mr. William John	29	Pontardawe, West Glamorgan	Wales	Southampton	New York City		
Rommetvedt, Mr. Knud Paust	49	Hogstad	Norway	Southampton	New York City		
Rosblom, Mrs. Helena Wilhelmina	41	Rauma	Finland	Southampton	Astoria, Oregon, US		
Rosblom, Mr. Viktor Rickard	18	Rauma	Finland	Southampton	Astoria, Oregon, US		
Rosblom, Miss Salli Helena	2	Rauma	Finland	Southampton	Astoria, Oregon, US		
Roth, Miss Sarah A.	26	London	England	Southampton	New York City	C	
Rouse, Mr. Richard Henry	50	Sittingbourne, Kent	England	Southampton	Cleveland, Ohio, US		
Rush, Mr. Alfred George John	16	Strood, Kent	England	Southampton	Detroit, Michigan, US		
Ryan, Mr. Edward	24	Ballinascreen, Tipperary	Ireland	Queenstown	Troy, New York, US	?	
Ryan, Mr. Patrick	29	Askeaton, Limerick	Ireland	Queenstown	Bronx, New York, US		
Sæther, Mr. Simon Sivertsen	43	Skaun, Sør-Trøndelag	Norway	Southampton	US		32^{MB}
Saad, Mr. Amin	30	Tebnine	Syria	Cherbourg	New York City		
Saad, Mr. Khalil	25	Kfar Mechi	Syria	Cherbourg	Ottawa, Ontario, Canada		
Sadlier, Mr. Matthew	20	Mohill, Leitrim	Ireland	Queenstown	Lakewood Township, New Jersey, US		
Sadowitz, Mr. Harry	17	London	England	Southampton	Providence, Rhode Island, US		
Sage, Mr. John George	44	Peterborough, Cambridgeshire	England	Southampton	Jacksonville, Florida, US		
Sage, Mrs. Annie Elizabeth (née Cazaly)	44	Peterborough, Cambridgeshire	England	Southampton	Jacksonville, Florida, US		
Sage, Miss Stella Anne	20	Peterborough, Cambridgeshire	England	Southampton	Jacksonville, Florida, US		
Sage, Mr. George John	19	Peterborough, Cambridgeshire	England	Southampton	Jacksonville, Florida, US		
Sage, Mr. Douglas Bullen	18	Peterborough, Cambridgeshire	England	Southampton	Jacksonville, Florida, US		
Sage, Mr. Frederick	16	Peterborough, Cambridgeshire	England	Southampton	Jacksonville, Florida, US		
Sage, Miss Dorothy Florence "Dolly"	14	Peterborough, Cambridgeshire	England	Southampton	Jacksonville, Florida, US		
Sage, Master Anthony William "Will"	13	Peterborough, Cambridgeshire	England	Southampton	Jacksonville, Florida, US		67^{MB}
Sage, Miss Elizabeth Ada	10	Peterborough, Cambridgeshire	England	Southampton	Jacksonville, Florida, US		
Sage, Miss Constance Gladys	7	Peterborough, Cambridgeshire	England	Southampton	Jacksonville, Florida, US		
Sage, Master Thomas Henry	4	Peterborough, Cambridgeshire	England	Southampton	Jacksonville, Florida, US		
Salander, Mr. Karl Johan	24	Genevad, Halland	Sweden	Southampton	Red Wing, Minnesota, US		
Salkjelsvik, Miss Anna Kristine	21	Ålesund, Møre og Romsdal	Norway	Southampton	Proctor, Minnesota, US	C	
Salonen, Mr. Johan Verner	39	Aberdeen, Washington	US	Southampton	Aberdeen, Washington, US		
Sa'maan, Master Butrus	10	Hardîne	Syria	Cherbourg	Wilkes Barre, Pennsylvania, US		
Sa'maan, Mr. Hanna Ilyas	40	Hardîne	Syria	Cherbourg	Wilkes Barre, Pennsylvania, US		
Sa'maan, Mr. Ilyas	17	Hardîne	Syria	Cherbourg	Wilkes Barre, Pennsylvania, US		
Sa'maan, Mr. Youssef Omar "Joseph"	16	Hardîne	Syria	Cherbourg	Wilkes Barre, Pennsylvania, US		
Sandström, Mrs. Agnes Charlotta (née Bengtsson)	24	Motala, Östergötland	Sweden	Southampton	San Francisco, US	13	
Sandström, Miss Margit Rut	4	Motala, Östergötland	Sweden	Southampton	San Francisco, US	13	
Sandström, Miss Beatrice Irene	1	Motala, Östergötland	Sweden	Southampton	San Francisco, US	13	
Sap, Mr. Julius (Jules)	21	Zwevezele	Belgium	Southampton	Detroit, Michigan, US	11	
Saundercock, Mr. William Henry	19	St Austell, Cornwall	England	Southampton	New York City		
Sawyer, Mr. Frederick Charles	33	Basingstoke, Hampshire	England	Southampton	Halley, Michigan, US		284^{MB}
Scanlan, Mr. James	22	Rathkeale, Limerick	Ireland	Queenstown	New York City		
Scheerlinck, Mr. Jean Baptiste	29	Haaltert, East Flanders	Belgium	Southampton	Detroit, Michigan, US	11	
Sdycoff, Mr. Theodor	42	Unknown	Bulgaria	Southampton	Chicago, Illinois, US		
Shaughnessy, Mr. Patrick	24	Tynagh, Galway	Ireland	Queenstown	New York City		
Shawah, Mr. Yousseff Ibrahim	33	Beirut	Syria	Cherbourg	New York City		
Shadid, Mr. Dahir Abu	19	Ibrin	Syria	Cherbourg	Kulpmont, Pennsylvania, US		9^{MB}
Shellard, Mr. Frederick William Blainey	55	Bristol, Avon	England	Southampton	Troy, New York, US		
Shihab, Mr. Amir Faris	25	Hadath	Syria	Cherbourg	New York City		
Shine, Miss Ellen Natalia	20	Cork, Cork	Ireland	Queenstown	New York City	?	
Shorney, Mr. Charles Joseph	22	Heron's Ghyll, East Sussex	England	Southampton	New York, US		240{?}^{MB}
Simmons, Mr. John	39	Leigh, Kent	England	Southampton	New York City		
Sirkanian, Mr. Arsun	22	Kiğı	Turkey	Cherbourg	Brantford, Ontario, Canada		
Sirota, Mr. Maurice	20	London	England	Southampton	New York City		
Sivić, Mr. Husein	40	Bosanska Krupa	Bosnia	Southampton	Harrisburg, Pennsylvania, US		
Sivola, Mr. Antti Vilhelmi	21	Mountain Home, Idaho	US	Southampton	Mountain Home, Idaho, US		
Sjöblom, Miss Anna Sofiia	18	Munsala	Finland	Southampton	Olympia, Washington, US	16	
Skoog, Mr. Wilhelm Johansson	40	Hällekis, Västergötland	Sweden	Southampton	Iron Mountain, Michigan, US		
Skoog, Mrs. Anna Bernhardina (née Karlsson)	43	Hällekis, Västergötland	Sweden	Southampton	Iron Mountain, Michigan, US		
Skoog, Master Karl Thorsten	11	Hällekis, Västergötland	Sweden	Southampton	Iron Mountain, Michigan, US		
Skoog, Miss Mabel	9	Hällekis, Västergötland	Sweden	Southampton	Iron Mountain, Michigan, US		
Skoog, Master Harald	5	Hällekis, Västergötland	Sweden	Southampton	Iron Mountain, Michigan, US		
Skoog, Miss Margit Elizabeth	2	Hällekis, Västergötland	Sweden	Southampton	Iron Mountain, Michigan, US		
Slabenoff, Mr. Peko	42	Unknown	Bulgaria	Southampton	New York City		
Slocovski, Mr. Selman Francis	20	London	England	Southampton	New York City		
Smiljanić, Mr. Jakob Mile	37	Pisac	Croatia	Southampton	New York City		
Smyth, Mr. Thomas	26	Caltra, Galway	Ireland	Queenstown	Hammond, Indiana, US		
Smyth, Miss Julia	17	Kilcogy, Cavan	Ireland	Queenstown	New York City	13	
Søholt, Mr. Peter Andreas Lauritz Andersen	19	Ålesund, Møre og Romsdal	Norway	Southampton	Minneapolis, Minnesota, US		
Somerton, Mr. Francis William	30	Greatfield, Cheltenham	England	Southampton	Canastota, New York, US		
Spector, Mr. Woolf	23	London	England	Southampton	New York City		
Spinner, Mr. Henry John	32	Arboretum, Worcestershire	England	Southampton	Gloversville, New York, US		
Staneff, Mr. Ivan	23	Debnevo, Troyan	Bulgaria	Southampton	Chicago, Illinois, US		
Stanković, Mr. Ivan	33	Galdovo	Croatia	Cherbourg	New York City		
Stanley, Miss Amy Zillah Elsie	24	Wallingford, Oxfordshire	England	Southampton	New Haven, Connecticut, US	15	
Stanley, Mr. Edward Rowland	21	Swanage	England	Southampton	Cleveland, Ohio, US		
Storey, Mr. Thomas	51	Liverpool, Merseyside	England	Southampton	New York City		261^{MB}
Stoytcheff, Mr. Ilia	19	Gumostnik, Lovec	Bulgaria	Southampton	Chicago, Illinois, US		
Strandberg, Miss Ida Sofia	22	Turku	Finland	Southampton	New York City		
Strandén, Mr. Juho Niilonpoika	31	Muljula, Kitee	Finland	Southampton	Duluth, Minnesota, US	9	
Strilić, Mr. Ivan	27	Široka Kula	Croatia	Southampton	Chicago, Illinois, US		
Ström, Mrs. Elna Matilda (née Persson)	29	Indiana Harbor, Indiana	US	Southampton	Indiana Harbor, Indiana, US		
Ström, Miss Thelma Matilda Wilhelmina	2	Indiana Harbor, Indiana	US	Southampton	Indiana Harbor, Indiana, US		
Sunderland, Mr. Victor Francis	20	London	England	Southampton	Cleveland, Ohio, US	B	
Sundman, Mr. Johan Julian	44	Munsala	Finland	Southampton	Cheyenne, Wyoming, US	15	
Sutehall Jr., Mr. Henry	25	London	England	Southampton	Buffalo, New York, US		
Svensson, Mr. Johan	74	Reftele, Småland	Sweden	Southampton	Effington Rut, South Dakota, US		
Svensson, Mr. Johan Cervin	14	Knäred, Halland	Sweden	Southampton	Beresford, South Dakota, US	13	
Svensson, Mr. Olof	24	Björkeberga, Skåne	Sweden	Southampton	New York City		
Tenglin, Mr. Gunnar Isidor	25	Stockholm, Uppland	Sweden	Southampton	Burlington, Iowa, US	13	
Theobald, Mr. Thomas Leonard	34	Strood, Kent	England	Southampton	Detroit, Michigan, US		176^{MB}
Tannous, Mr. Bashir (Charles)	31	Hardîne	Syria	Cherbourg	Wilkes Barre, Pennsylvania, US		
Tannous, Mrs. Thamini Khoury Fa'ud "Thelma"	16	Hardîne	Syria	Cherbourg	Wilkes Barre, Pennsylvania, US	14	
Tannous, Master As'ad Iskandar Fa'ud	5 mo.	Hardîne	Syria	Cherbourg	Wilkes Barre, Pennsylvania, US	16	
Thomas, Mr. John	34	Unknown	Unknown	Cherbourg	Columbus, Ohio, US		
Thomas, Mr. Tannous John	16	Unknown	Syria	Cherbourg	Columbus, Ohio, US		
Thompson, Mr. Alexander Morrison	36	Unknown	Scotland	Southampton	New York City		
Thorneycroft, Mr. Percival Thomas	36	Maidstone, Kent	England	Southampton	Clinton, New York, US		
Thorneycroft, Mrs. Florence Kate (née Stears)	32	Maidstone, Kent	England	Southampton	Clinton, New York, US	10	
Tikkanen, Mr. Juho	32	Pielavesi	Finland	Southampton	New York City		
Tobin, Mr. Roger	20	Cahir, Tipperary	Ireland	Queenstown	New York City		
Todoroff, Mr. Lalio	23	Unknown	Bulgaria	Southampton	Chicago, Illinois, US		
Tomlin, Mr. Ernest Portage	22	Portage la Prairie, Manitoba	Canada	Southampton	Des Moines, Iowa, US		50^{MB}
Törber, Mr. Ernst Wilhelm	44	Unknown	Germany	Southampton	New York City		
Torfa, Mr. Assad	20	Unknown	Syria	Cherbourg	New York City		
Törnquist, Mr. William Henry	25	Sundbyberg	Sweden	Southampton	New York City	15	
Touma, Mrs. Hanna Youssef (née Razi)	27	Tibnin	Syria	Cherbourg	Dowagiac, Michigan, US	C	
Touma, Miss Marianna Youssef	9	Tibnin	Syria	Cherbourg	Dowagiac, Michigan, US	C	
Touma, Master Gerios (George) Youssef	8	Tibnin	Syria	Cherbourg	Dowagiac, Michigan, US	C	
Turčin, Mr. Stjepan	36	Bratina	Croatia	Southampton	Youngstown, Ohio, US		
Turja, Miss Anna Sofiia	18	Oulainen, Oulu	Finland	Southampton	Ashtabula, Ohio, US	15	
Turkula, Mrs. Hedvig	63	Jalasjärvi, Southern Ostrobothnia	Finland	Southampton	Hibbing, Minnesota, US	15	
Van Billiard, Mr. Austin Blyler	35	London	England	Southampton	North Wales, Pennsylvania, US		255^{MB}
Van Billiard, Master James William	10	London	England	Southampton	North Wales, Pennsylvania, US		
Van Billiard, Master Walter John	9	London	England	Southampton	North Wales, Pennsylvania, US		1{?}^{MB}
Van de Velde, Mr. Johannes Josef	35	Denderhoutem	Belgium	Southampton	New York City		
Van den Steen, Mr. Leo Peter	28	Haaltert	Belgium	Southampton	New York City		
Van Impe, Mr. Jean-Baptiste	36	Kerksken	Belgium	Southampton	Detroit, Michigan, US		
Van Impe, Mrs. Rosalie Paula (née Govaert)	30	Kerksken	Belgium	Southampton	Detroit, Michigan, US		
Van Impe, Miss Catharina	10	Kerksken	Belgium	Southampton	Detroit, Michigan, US		
Van Melkebeke, Mr. Philemon Edmund	23	Haaltert, East Flanders	Belgium	Southampton	Detroit, Michigan, US		
Vandercruyssen, Mr. Victor	46	Zwevezele	Belgium	Southampton	Detroit, Michigan, US		
Vanderplancke, Mr. Julius	31	Zwevezele	Belgium	Southampton	Fremont, Ohio, US		
Vanderplancke, Mrs. Emelie Maria (née Vandemoortele)	31	Pittem	Belgium	Southampton	Fremont, Ohio, US		
Vanderplancke, Miss Augusta Maria	18	Zwevezele	Belgium	Southampton	Fremont, Ohio, US		
Vanderplancke, Mr. Leo Edmondus	15	Zwevezele	Belgium	Southampton	Fremont, Ohio, US		
Van de Walle, Mr. Nestor Cyriel	28	Westrozebeke	Belgium	Southampton	New York City		
Vartanian, Mr. Davit	22	Kiğı	Turkey	Cherbourg	Brantford, Ontario, Canada	13	
Vendel, Mr. Olof Edvin	29	Östra Sallerup, Skåne	Sweden	Southampton	St. Paul, Minnesota, US		
Veström, Miss Hulda Amanda Adolfina	14	Salmunds, Gotland	Sweden	Southampton	Los Angeles, US		
Vovk, Mr. Janko	21	Jesenice	Slovenia	Southampton	St. Joseph, Minnesota, US		
Waelens, Mr. Achille	22	Ruiselede, West Flanders	Belgium	Southampton	Stanton, Ohio, US		140^{MB}
Ware, Mr. Frederick William	34	Greenwich, London	England	Southampton	New York City		
Warren, Mr. Charles William	30	Portsmouth, Hampshire	England	Southampton	New York City		
Wazni, Mr. Yousif Ahmed	25	Tebnin	Syria	Cherbourg	New York City		
Webber, Mr. James	66	San Francisco	US	Southampton	San Francisco, US		
Widegren, Mr. Carl Peter	51	Algutsrum, Kalmar	Sweden	Southampton	New York City		
Wiklund, Mr. Jakob Alfred	18	Nikolaistad	Finland	Southampton	Montreal, Quebec, Canada		314
Wiklund, Mr. Karl Johan	21	Nikolaistad	Finland	Southampton	Montreal, Quebec, Canada		
Wilkes, Mrs. Ellen	47	Penzance, Cornwall	England	Southampton	Akron, Ohio, US	16	
Willer, Mr. Aaron	37	Unknown	Russia	Cherbourg	Chicago, Illinois, US		
Willey, Mr. Edward	18	Market Drayton, Shropshire	England	Southampton	Schenectady, New York, US		
Williams, Mr. Howard Hugh "Harry"	28	Guernsey, Channel Islands	Channel Islands	Southampton	New York City		
Williams, Mr. Leslie	28	Tonypandy, Glamorgan	Wales	Southampton	New York City		14^{MB}
Windeløv, Mr. Einar	21	Cape Town	South Africa	Southampton	New York City		
Wirz, Mr. Albert	27	Uster	Switzerland	Southampton	Beloit, Wisconsin, US		131^{MB}
Wiseman, Mr. Phillippe	54	London	England	Southampton	Quebec City, Quebec, Canada		
Wittevrongel, Mr. Camilius Aloysius	36	Westrozebeke	Belgium	Southampton	Detroit, Michigan, US		
Yasbak, Mr. Antun	27	Unknown	Syria	Cherbourg	Wilkes-Barre, Pennsylvania, US		
Yasbak, Mrs. Silanah Fa'ud (née Iskandar)	15	Unknown	Syria	Cherbourg	Wilkes-Barre, Pennsylvania, US	?	
Ylieff, Mr. Ylio	32	Unknown	Bulgaria	Southampton	Chicago, Illinois, US		
Youssef, Mr. Gerios (Abi Saab)	26	Hardîne	Syria	Cherbourg	Youngstown, Ohio, US		312^{M}
Youssef, Mr. Gerios (Sam'aan)	45	Hardîne	Syria	Cherbourg	Wilkes-Barre, Pennsylvania, US		
Zajib Qiyamah, Miss Adal "Jane"	15	El Shweir	Syria	Cherbourg	Brooklyn, New York, US	C	
Zakarian, Mr. Haroutyun Der	27	Kiğı	Turkey	Cherbourg	Brantford, Ontario, Canada		
Zakarian, Mr. Mapri Der	22	Kiğı	Turkey	Cherbourg	Brantford, Ontario, Canada		304^{MB}
Zimmermann, Mr. Leo	29	Todtmoos	Germany	Southampton	Saskatoon, Saskatchewan, Canada		

== Cross-channel passengers ==
In addition to the above-listed passengers, the Titanic carried 29 cross-channel passengers who boarded at Southampton and disembarked at either Cherbourg, France, or Queenstown, Ireland.

Name	Age	Class	Hometown	Boarded	Disembarked
Brand, Mr. Karl Birger	29	First	Falköping, Västergötland, Sweden	Southampton	Cherbourg
Browne, Mr. Francis Patrick Mary	31	First	Dublin, Ireland	Southampton	Queenstown
Collis, Mr.	–	First	–	Southampton	Cherbourg
Davies, Mr. H. V.	–	Second	–	Southampton	Cherbourg
Davies, Miss K.	–	Second	–	Southampton	Cherbourg
De Grasse, Mr. J.	–	First	–	Southampton	Cherbourg
Dyer-Edwardes, Mr. Thomas	65	First	Kensington, England	Southampton	Cherbourg (Note: Mr. and Mrs. Dyer-Edwardes embarked at Southampton with their daughter, the Countess of Rothes, and niece, Gladys Cherry.)
Dyer-Edwardes, Mrs. Clementina Georgina Lucy		First	Kensington, England	Southampton	Cherbourg
Evans, Miss	–	Second	–	Southampton	Cherbourg
Fletcher, Miss N.	–	First	–	Southampton	Cherbourg
Forman, Mr. J.	–	First	–	Southampton	Cherbourg
Forman, Mrs.	–	First	–	Southampton	Cherbourg
Lenox-Conyngham, Miss Alice Katherine Harriet	39	First	Edinburgh, Scotland	Southampton	Cherbourg
Lenox-Conyngham, Mrs. Barbara Josephine (née Turton)	48	First	Edinburgh, Scotland	Southampton	Cherbourg
Lenox-Conyngham, Miss Eileen Mary	11	First	Edinburgh, Scotland	Southampton	Cherbourg
Lenox-Conyngham, Master Denis Hugh	10	First	Edinburgh, Scotland	Southampton	Cherbourg
May, Mr. Richard W.	54	First	–	Southampton	Queenstown
May, Mr. Stanley	45	First	–	Southampton	Queenstown
Mullen, Mr.	-	Second	–	Southampton	Cherbourg
Nichols, Mr. E.	48	First	–	Southampton	Queenstown
Noel, Major Gerard Thomas	56	First	–	Southampton	Cherbourg
Noel, Master William Henry Middleton	13	First	–	Southampton	Cherbourg
Odell, Miss Kate	42	First	–	Southampton	Queenstown
Odell, Mrs. Lily May	40	First	–	Southampton	Queenstown
Odell, Master Jack Dudley	11	First	–	Southampton	Queenstown
Osborne, Miss D.	–	Second	–	Southampton	Cherbourg
Remesch, Miss	–	Second	–	Southampton	Cherbourg
Stevens, Mr. G.	–	First	–	Southampton	Cherbourg
Tovey, Miss	–	Second	–	Southampton	Cherbourg
Wotton, Mr. Henry Swaffin	54	First	–	Southampton	Cherbourg

== First passenger survivors to die ==
Name	Date of birth	Date of death	Age at time of disaster	Age at time of death	Additional notes
Miss Maria Nackid	1 May 1910	30 July 1912	1 year, 350 days	2 years, 90 days	First Titanic survivor to die, after contracting meningitis
Miss Eujini Baqlini	1909	30 August 1912	3 years	3 years	Died a month after Maria Nackid, also of meningitis
Colonel Archibald Gracie IV	15 January 1858	4 December 1912	54 years, 91 days	54 years, 324 days	Died of health complications he suffered due to the sinking; Gracie wrote one of the first accounts of the sinking by a survivor, The Truth about the Titanic
Mrs. Marie Eugenie Spencer	1867	26 October 1913	45 years	46–47 years	
Mr. Maximilian Josef Frölicher	24 September 1851	22 November 1913	60 years, 204 days	62 years, 59 days	
Miss Kornelia Theodosia Andrews	12 August 1849	4 December 1913	62 years, 247 days	64 years, 124 days	Died of pneumonia

== Last passenger survivors to die ==
Name	Date of birth	Date of death	Age at time of disaster	Age at time of death	Additional notes
Mrs. Anna F. "Annie" Straube (née McGowan)	5 July 1897	30 January 1990	14 years, 285 days	92 years, 209 days	
Mrs. Ruth Elizabeth Blanchard (née Becker)	28 October 1899	6 July 1990	12 years, 170 days	90 years, 251 days	
Mr. Michael Peter Joseph	11 May 1907	18 May 1991	4 years, 340 days	84 years, 7 days	
Mr. Frank Phillip Aks	7 June 1911	15 July 1991	313 days	80 years, 38 days	
Mr. George Joseph Thomas (né Jirjis Yūsuf Tu'mah/George Touma)	9 February 1904	9 December 1991	8 years, 66 days	87 years, 303 days	Last remaining Middle East-born survivor.
Mr. Bertram Vere Dean	21 May 1910	14 April 1992	1 year, 330 days	81 years, 329 days	Sibling of the last living survivor, Millvina Dean
Mrs. Marjorie Anne Robb (née Newell)	12 February 1889	11 June 1992	23 years, 63 days	103 years, 195 days	Last survivor who was a first class passenger.
Mrs. Louise Gretchen Pope (née Kink)	8 April 1908	25 August 1992	4 years, 7 days	84 years, 139 days	Last remaining Swiss-born survivor.
Mr. Alden Gates Caldwell	10 June 1911	18 December 1992	310 days	81 years, 191 days	
Mrs. Robertha Josephine Marshall (née Watt)	7 September 1899	4 March 1993	12 years, 221 days	93 years, 178 days	Last remaining Canadian survivor.
Mrs. Ellen Natalia Callaghan (née Shine)	30 December 1891	5 March 1993	20 years, 107 days	101 years, 65 days	Last living survivor who was an adult at the time of the sinking; last living survivor of Irish background.
Miss Beatrice Irene Sandström	9 August 1910	3 September 1995	1 year, 250 days	85 years, 25 days	Last remaining Swedish survivor.
Miss Eva Miriam Hart MBE	31 January 1905	14 February 1996	7 years, 75 days	91 years, 14 days	
Mrs. Edith Eileen Haisman (née Brown)	27 October 1896	20 January 1997	15 years, 171 days	100 years, 85 days	Last survivor who was a teenager at the time of the sinking; last survivor born in the 19th century
Miss Louise Marguerite Laroche	2 July 1910	28 January 1998	1 year, 288 days	87 years, 210 days	
Mrs. Eleanor Ileen Shuman (née Johnson)	23 August 1910	7 March 1998	1 year, 236 days	87 years, 196 days	
Mr. Michel Marcel Navratil	12 June 1908	30 January 2001	3 years, 308 days	92 years, 232 days	Last remaining male survivor; last remaining French survivor. Along with brother Edmond (1910–1953), were the only children rescued without a parent or guardian (known as the Titanic Orphans)
Mrs. Winnifred Vera van Tongerloo (née Quick)	23 January 1904	4 July 2002	8 years, 83 days	98 years, 162 days	The last survivor who lost no relatives in the sinking.
Miss Lillian Gertrud Asplund	21 October 1906	6 May 2006	5 years, 177 days	99 years, 197 days	Last remaining American survivor; last living survivor with memories of the accident.
Mrs. Barbara Joyce Dainton (née West)	24 May 1911	16 October 2007	327 days	96 years, 145 days	Last remaining survivor who was a second class passenger.
Miss Elizabeth Gladys "Millvina" Dean	2 February 1912	31 May 2009	73 days	97 years, 118 days	Last living survivor and sibling of Bertram Dean, another one of the last remaining survivors. She was the last remaining British survivor, and the last who was a third class passenger.

== See also ==
- Crew of the Titanic
