= Rigel (disambiguation) =

Rigel is a blue supergiant star in the constellation Orion, also known as Beta Orionis.

Rigel may also refer to:

- Rigel (comics), a character in a series published by Panini Comics
- Rigel (dog), a Newfoundland dog said to have helped rescue survivors from the sinking of the Titanic
- Rigel (microprocessor), a VAX microprocessor chip set developed and fabricated by Digital Equipment Corporation
- Rigel (rocket), an Argentinian sounding rocket
- MS Rigel, a Norwegian and German vessel
- USS Rigel (AD-13), a ship built in 1918 as Edgecombe
- USS Rigel (AF-58), a ship laid down in 1954
- SSM-N-6 Rigel, a proposed cruise missile system
- Rigel, a composition for trumpet and piano by Hale A. VanderCook
- Rigel, a genus of megalyrid wasps from Chile
- Rigel, a fictional nation in Fire Emblem Gaiden and Fire Emblem Echoes: Shadows of Valentia
- KRI Rigel (933), an Indonesian Navy research vessel

== People with the surname ==
- Henri-Joseph Rigel, a German-born French composer

== See also ==
- Rygel, the Farscape character
- Riegel (disambiguation), several meanings
- Rigil Kentaurus, a Sun-like star in the constellation Centaurus also known as Alpha Centauri A, distance only about 4.37 light-years
- USS Rigel, a list of US Navy ships
