= Rigel (dog) =

Dog involved in sinking of Titanic

Rigel, supposedly, was a large black Newfoundland dog who was said to have saved some of the survivors of the sinking of the RMS Titanic. One account of the story was published in the New York Herald, April 21, 1912, the other was the book Sinking of the Titanic and Great sea disasters by Logan Marshall, published in 1912.

== Story ==
According to the narrative, Rigel was said to have been owned by William McMaster Murdoch, the First Officer of the Titanic. Murdoch died in the sinking, but Rigel swam away, and stayed close to one of the lifeboats (Boat #4, in some accounts). When RMS Carpathia arrived on the scene looking for survivors, Rigel began to bark. The lifeboat had drifted under the bows of the Carpathia, and was at risk of being run down, but the people in the boat were too exhausted to make themselves heard. Rigel's barks alerted Captain Arthur Rostron, who ordered the engines stopped and began the search for survivors. Everyone in the lifeboat was saved, and Rigel was pulled from the icy water after three hours, unaffected by the experience. The dog was too large to be pulled from the water by hand, but a seaman aboard the Carpathia, Jonas Briggs, managed to get a canvas sling under its belly, with which it was hauled aboard.

== Veracity ==
This story, however, has been the subject of controversy and skepticism. The above narrative has typically been credited to Rigel's inventive savior, Jonas Briggs, who later adopted the dog. But researchers have raised doubts about his role in the story. They note that there is no record of a "Jonas Briggs" working aboard the Carpathia at the time. Moreover, none of the survivors in lifeboat number four mentioned the dog in their accounts of their rescue. The Carpathia had also stopped her engines long before picking up Lifeboat 4, which rowed towards her rather than the other way around. Also, contrary to the legend (which claims that conditions were foggy), witness testimony and photographic evidence show that conditions were perfectly clear the morning after the disaster. So, this story is very likely to be untrue.

Another theory, most notably advocated by Stanley Coren, claims that the Carpathia's Master at Arms, John Brown, adopted Rigel, while "Brigg" was the name of a passenger aboard one of the lifeboats (however, there was no Titanic survivor of that name either). In this telling, John Brown retired soon after the incident and took the Newfoundland with him to his home in rural Scotland. There, the dog lived to an old age. The source for this is a 1962 interview that Brown's granddaughter gave for BBC radio. However, while the story has unmistakable similarities, she did not directly connect it to the legend, saying that her grandfather never determined the dog's name or owner. The story remains anecdotal, as no verified Titanic or Carpathia passengers or crew mention the dog in their own accounts.

The website WilliamMurdoch.net, dedicated to the life of Murdoch, rejects the story, agreeing it to be a myth. Neither Murdoch nor his wife are known to have owned a dog. Richard Edkins, who runs the website Murdoch of the Titanic (also dedicated to Murdoch's life) and is affiliated with Murdoch's surviving relatives, dismissed the story as "arrant rubbish". The website notes that this is particularly unusual given that a dog owned by a well-known officer would surely have been documented, especially had he performed such a significant rescue. The final argument is that Ada, Murdoch's surviving widow, would likely have kept the dog afterwards had he existed, rather than the Carpathia crew.

The webmaster speculated that the story was invented because newspapers in the days after the disaster were offering money for Titanic stories, that it spread because it provided a more hopeful tale at a time when troubling rumors of Murdoch's demise were circulating, and that it has endured due to its popularity among dog lovers. They write "the story seems to have struck a chord with many who overlook the fact that it has no basis in fact."

== See also ==
- List of individual dogs
- List of fictional dogs
- Animals aboard the RMS Titanic
- Legends and myths regarding RMS Titanic

== Notes and references ==
Citations

Sources

- Brush, Karen (2007). Everything Dogs Expect You to Know. New Holland Publishers. ISBN 9781845379544.
- Maltin, Tim; Aston, Eloise (November 29, 2011). 101 Things You Thought You Knew About the Titanic . . . but Didn't!. Penguin. ISBN 978-1-101-55893-5.
- Marshall, Logan (August 2008). Sinking of the Titanic and Great Sea Disasters – As Told by First Hand Account of Survivors and Initial Investigations. Arc Manor LLC. ISBN 978-1-60450-281-7.
- Matthews, Rupert (March 1, 2011). Titanic. Arcturus Publishing. p. 324. ISBN 978-1-84837-763-9.
- Steele, Randy (March 2007). "Ruff and Ready". Boating. ISSN 0006-5374.

Further reading

- Jamesson, Christine; Sweet, Lisa (December 30, 2005). The Legend of Rigel: Hero Dog of the Titanic. AuthorHouse. ISBN 978-1-4208-8679-5.
