= Riegel =

Riegel may refer to:

- Riegel (surname)
- Riegel (glacial), ridges of bedrock that have been exposed by glacial erosion
- Riegel am Kaiserstuhl, German municipality in the district of Emmendingen in Baden-Württemberg
- Riegelsville, Pennsylvania
- New Riegel, Ohio

== See also ==
- Rigel (disambiguation)
