= Animals aboard the Titanic =

Dogs on board the Titanic.

There were many animals aboard Titanic during her disastrous maiden voyage, which ended with the ship sinking on 15 April 1912 after colliding with an iceberg.

They included dogs, cats, chickens, other birds and an unknown number of rats. Three of the twelve dogs on Titanic survived.

== Inventory ==
The ship had her own official cat named Jenny, who was kept aboard Titanic as a mascot and also worked to reduce the rat and mice population. Transferred over from Titanic's sister ship Olympic, Jenny gave birth in the week before Titanic sailed from Southampton. She normally lived in the galley, where the victualling staff fed her and her kittens on scraps from the kitchens. Stewardess Violet Jessop wrote that the cat "laid her family near Jim, the scullion, whose approval she always sought and who always gave her warm devotion".

A number of dogs were brought aboard by passengers as pets. Most were kept in kennels on the ship's boat deck, though some First Class passengers kept theirs in their cabins – probably without the knowledge of the crew or with the turning of a blind eye, as they were not supposed to do so. The ship's carpenter, John Hutchison, was responsible for the dogs' welfare. The kennel dogs were exercised daily on the poop deck by a steward or one of the bellboys. As for the lapdogs, the American painter Francis Davis Millet wrote disapprovingly in a letter sent from Titanic's last stop, Queenstown in Ireland, "Looking over the [passenger] list I only find three or four people I know but there are ... a number of obnoxious, ostentatious American women, the scourge of any place they infest, and worse on shipboard than anywhere. Many of them carry tiny dogs, and lead husbands around like pet lambs". The dog owners had planned to hold a dog show aboard the ship on the morning of 15 April, but Titanic sank well before dawn that morning.

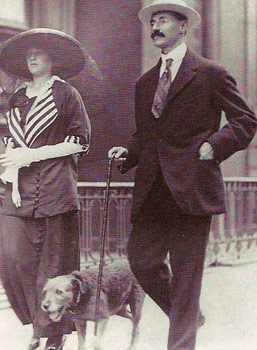
The Astors with their Airedale, "Kitty"

The details of several of the dogs aboard Titanic were recorded and included:

- A King Charles Spaniel and an elderly Airedale Terrier, owned by William and Lucile Carter. Did not survive.
- A Chow Chow owned by stockbroker Harry Anderson. Did not survive.
- A champion French Bulldog born January 1910 called Gamin de Pycombe, owned by Robert Williams Daniel, who had bought him in England for the very high price of £150 (£10,724 in 2015 prices). Did not survive.
- Kitty, another Airedale Terrier, owned by millionaire John Jacob Astor. Did not survive and perished with her owner.
- A male Pomeranian owned by Margaret Bechstein Hays, named Bebe (and not "Lady" as has been erroneously reported), which she kept (probably surreptitiously) in her cabin. Survived.
- A dog owned by Elizabeth Rothschild, also kept in her cabin. Survived.
- A Pekingese called Sun Yat Sen, owned by Henry Sleeper Harper and his wife Myra. Survived.
- Frou-Frou, a toy dog owned by Helen Bishop. The dog was allowed to stay in her cabin as the stewards considered it "too pretty" to put among the bigger dogs in the kennels. Helen left Frou-Frou to die in the cabin when she realized that “there would be little sympathy for a woman carrying a dog in her arms when there were lives of women and children to be saved.” Did not survive.

There were probably more dogs aboard, but their details (and owners) have not survived. Passenger Charles Moore of Washington, D.C. made a last-minute change to his plans to transport aboard Titanic 100 English foxhounds, which he intended to use to start an English-style fox hunt in the Washington area. They were instead shipped aboard another vessel.

As well as the dogs and cats, there were a number of birds aboard. Ella Holmes White of New York brought four roosters and hens, which were probably kept in or near the first class galley. She had imported them from France with the intention of improving her poultry stock at home. Another woman was said to have brought 30 cockerels aboard and Elizabeth Ramel Nye brought her yellow canary. Two dogs and a canary disembarked with the passengers who left the ship at Cherbourg Harbour, Titanic's first port of call after Southampton. The animals travelled on their own tickets and even the canary that left at Cherbourg had to be paid for, to the tune of 25 US cents.

Like any other ship, Titanic had a substantial population of rats. One was seen running across the Third Class Dining Room on the evening of the sinking, to the shock and amazement of the diners. Some of the women who saw it burst into tears, while men tried unsuccessfully to capture the rat.

== Fate ==
Few of Titanic's animals survived the ship's sinking. Three of the dogs were taken aboard lifeboats by their owners. Margaret Hays' Pomeranian got away safely in Lifeboat 7 and lived at least until June 1917 when she ran away or was stolen. Elizabeth Jane Anne Rothschild also kept her Pomeranian alive with her throughout the night on Lifeboat 6. Upon rescue, the crew of the Carpathia initially refused to take the dog. Mrs. Rothschild refused to leave Lifeboat 6 without her Pomeranian, so the crew eventually complied and hoisted her aboard while she held onto the dog. It later perished in New York City to an unknown fate. Henry and Myra Harper brought their Pekingese aboard Lifeboat 3, but Helen Bishop had to abandon Frou-Frou in her cabin, much to their mutual distress. The dog attempted to stop her leaving by holding on to her dress with his teeth until the seam tore. Afterwards, Bishop spoke of her sorrow: "The loss of my little dog hurt me very much. I will never forget how he dragged on my clothes. He so wanted to accompany me".

None of the other animals survived. At some point during the sinking, someone decided to free the dogs from their kennels, leading to a pack of excited dogs racing up and down the slanting deck as the ship went down. One female passenger is said to have refused to be parted from her dog and chose to stay aboard. Several days later, as the SS Bremen passed through an area still strewn with debris and bodies floating in the water, a single passenger saw the body of what she thought was a woman tightly holding what could have been a large shaggy dog in her arms. Robert W. Daniel's bulldog Gamin de Pycombe was last seen in the water swimming for his life after the ship went down.

After the sinking, several of the surviving animal owners made compensation claims for their lost pets and poultry. Daniel claimed $750 for the loss of his pedigree bulldog, while Carter claimed $300 for the loss of his two dogs. White claimed $207.87 for her lost chickens and Anderson claimed $50 for his Chow-Chow.
