= Frederick Fleet =

British sailor, RMS Titanic survivor (1887–1965)

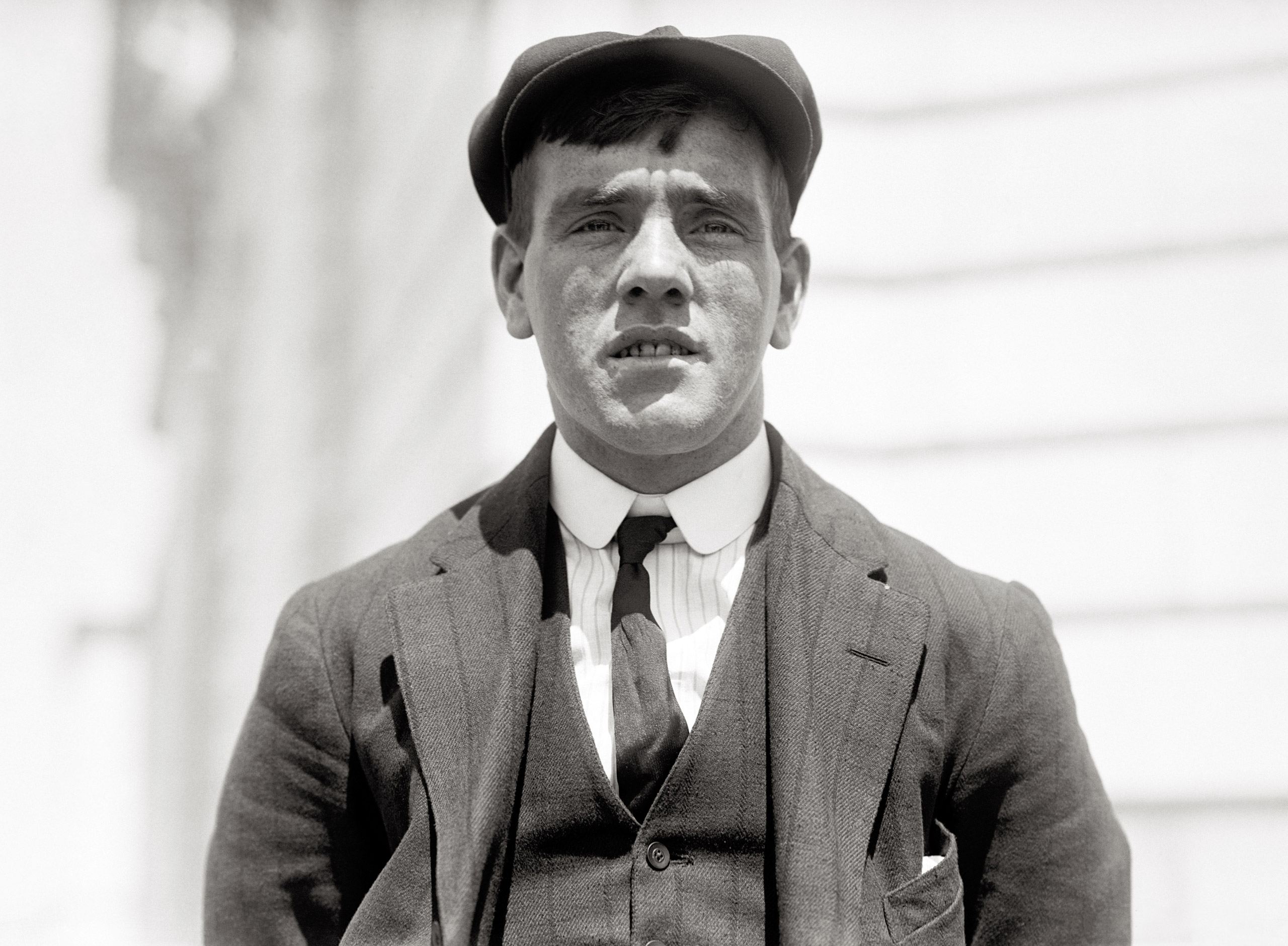
- Fleet in 1912
- Born: 15 October 1887; Liverpool, Lancashire, England, United Kingdom
- Died: 10 January 1965 (aged 77); Southampton, Hampshire, England, United Kingdom
- Resting place: Hollybrook Cemetery, Southampton, Hampshire, England
- Occupation: Merchant sailor
- Years active: 1903–1936
- Known for: Lookout aboard RMS Titanic, likely the first to spot the iceberg which the ship struck
- Spouse: Eva Le Gros (m. 1917; died 1964)
- Children: 1

Frederick Fleet (15 October 1887 – 10 January 1965) was a British merchant sailor who survived the sinking of the RMS Titanic. He served as a lookout on board the RMS Titanic and was likely the first to sight the iceberg that the ship struck on the night of 14 April 1912, ringing the warning bell and reporting "Iceberg, right ahead!" to the bridge. Fleet survived, leaving the ship in Lifeboat No. 6, and later maintained at both the American and British inquiries that he and his fellow lookouts would have seen the iceberg sooner had they been supplied with binoculars.

After the disaster, Fleet continued to work at sea, serving on the RMS Olympic at different points in his career and with merchant lines during both World War I and World War II. He left seafaring in 1936 to work for Harland & Wolff in Southampton before returning for the Second World War and then retired permanently. In later life, he experienced financial difficulties and it is likely that he suffered from depression which, after the death of his wife, worsened. Fleet died by suicide in 1965 at the age of 77. His grave remained unmarked until 1993, when the Titanic Historical Society erected a gravestone in his honour.

== Early life and maritime career ==
Frederick Fleet was born on 15 October 1887 in Liverpool, England. He never knew his father, and his mother abandoned him when she left with a boyfriend for Springfield, Massachusetts, after which she was never seen or heard from again. Fleet was brought up by a series of foster families and distant relatives. In 1903 he went to sea as a deck boy and later became an able seaman.

Before joining the crew of the RMS Titanic, he had spent more than four years as a lookout on the RMS Oceanic. As a seaman, Fleet earned five pounds a month, with an additional five shillings for lookout duty. He, along with five others, joined the Titanic as a lookout in April 1912.

== RMS Titanic ==
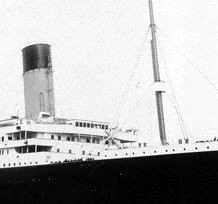
The crow's nest from which Fleet and Lee spotted the iceberg can be seen in the picture.

Fleet boarded the Titanic in Southampton on 10 April 1912. The ship made two stops, first at Cherbourg, France, and then at Queenstown, Ireland. During the voyage, the six lookouts worked two-hour shifts in crow's nest. The voyage was uneventful until the night of 14 April 1912. At 10:00 pm that night, Fleet and his fellow lookout Reginald Lee relieved George Symons and Archie Jewell at the nest. They were given the earlier order from Second Officer Charles Lightoller to keep watch for small ice. The night was calm and moonless, which made icebergs difficult to see because there were no waves breaking at their base and no reflection from the moonlight.

Although Fleet and the other lookouts repeatedly asked for binoculars, none were provided. This has sometimes been linked to the last‑minute change in the ship's officer line‑up, when David Blair was removed from the maiden‑voyage crew, following the appointment of Henry Tingle Wilde as chief officer. Blair had lent his own pair of binoculars to the lookouts during the delivery trip to Southampton and, upon leaving, they were likely given to the new Second Officer, Charles Lightoller, for his own use. Neither of the subsequent inquiries clarified why the lookouts were not supplied with binoculars, although evidence indicates that lookouts on White Star Line steamers did not routinely use them. Experts have argued that, even with binoculars, neither Fleet nor Lee would have been able to spot the iceberg any earlier given the conditions that night. Binoculars were and remain for identifying objects, not spotting them.

At 11:39 pm, Fleet saw the iceberg and rang the crow's nest bell three times to warn the bridge that there was something straight ahead. He then used the nest's telephone to report it. The call was answered by Sixth Officer James Moody, who asked him, "What did you see?" Fleet gave the warning, "Iceberg! Right Ahead!" Moody passed the message to First Officer William Murdoch, who was in charge of the bridge. After the collision, Fleet and Lee remained on duty for a further 20 minutes and were relieved by Alfred Frank Evans and George Hogg at 12:00 A.M.

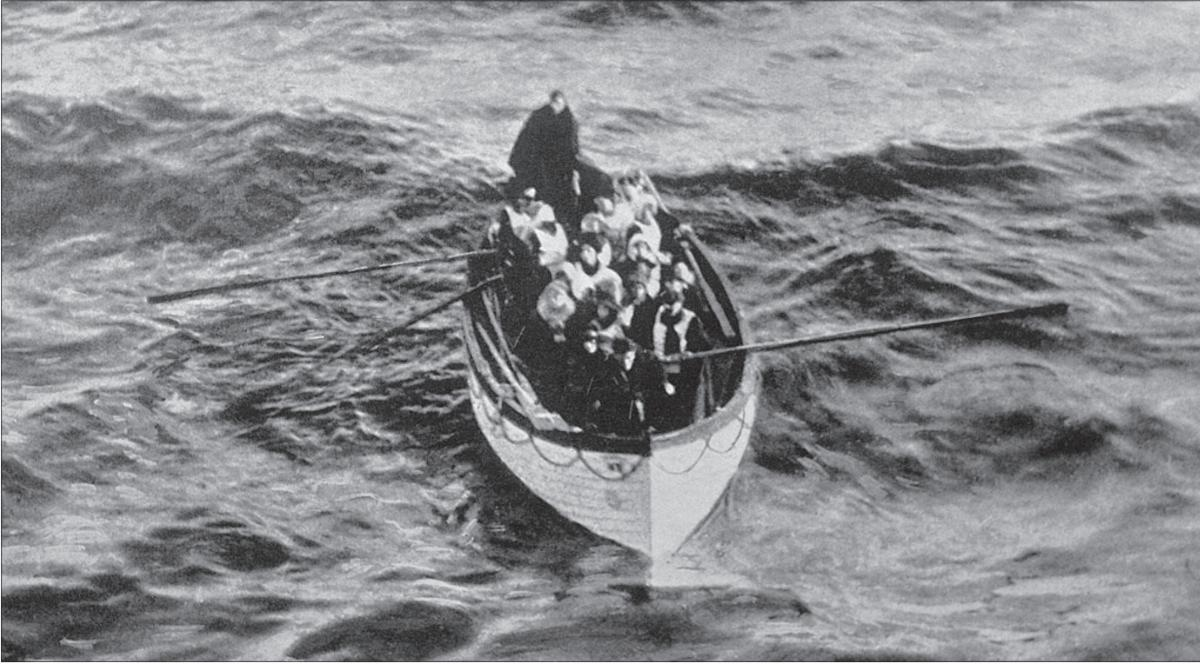
Lifeboat 6 approaching the RMS Carpathia

Fleet went down to the boat deck and helped prepare Lifeboat No. 6. Second officer Lightoller placed quartermaster Robert Hichens in charge of the boat and ordered Fleet to board as well. As the boat was lowered, Hichens realised that only two sailors, including Fleet, were available to man it, and called for another seaman. As none was nearby, Canadian Major Arthur Peuchen volunteered, saying he had sailing experience. Lightoller instructed him to reach the boat by climbing down a rope.

Once clear of the sinking ship, the lifeboat attempted to row towards the lights of a vessel in the distance, believed to be the SS Californian. While Hichens remained at the tiller, Fleet and Peuchen rowed. Arguments broke out in the boat and there were later claims that Hichens insulted and mistreated the rowers, including by Margaret Brown and Helen Churchill Candee. Later in the night, there was disagreement about whether to return for survivors, with Hichens warning that the boat would be swamped. Lifeboat No. 6 reached RMS Carpathia by 6:00 am on Monday, 15 April 1912.

After the disaster, Fleet gave evidence to two inquiries: first the American Senate Inquiry, then the British Wreck Commissioner's inquiry. In the United States, he was questioned by Senator William Alden Smith, to whom he repeatedly stated that, had they been supplied with binoculars, the disaster would not have occurred. At the British inquiry, he underwent a lengthy examination but declined to answer many questions and was defensive. Lord Mersey, the wreck commissioner, ended the session by thanking him for his willingness to respond despite his evident reluctance. Fleet replied sarcastically, "Thanks."

== Later life ==
Fleet served on the Titanic's sister ship RMS Olympic before leaving the White Star Line in August 1912. For the next 24 years he sailed for various shipping companies, including the Union-Castle Line. He served on merchant ships throughout World War I. Later, during the 1920s and early 1930s, he again worked as a lookout on the Olympic.

When he left the sea in 1936, he was employed by Harland & Wolff at the company's shipyards in Southampton. While working there, he lived with his wife's brother. He served again during World War II. Closer to retirement, he became a newspaper salesman and experienced financial difficulties.

In 1917, Fleet married Eva Ernestine Le Gros, a native of the Channel Islands; they were married until her death in 1964. The couple had a daughter named Dorothy Frederica Ernestine Fleet on 24 November 1918. Dorothy married in 1939 to Michael Patrick Shanley and had two known children. She died in Southampton in early 1979.

== Death ==
On 28 December 1964, Fleet's wife died, and her brother evicted him from the house. Fleet subsequently fell into a downward spiral of depression. He returned to his brother‑in‑law's home and died by hanging in the garden on 10 January 1965. He was 77. Fleet was buried in a pauper's grave at Hollybrook Cemetery in Southampton. The grave remained unmarked until 1993, when a headstone bearing an engraving of the Titanic was erected using donations raised by the Titanic Historical Society.

== Portrayals ==
- Bernard Fox (1958) A Night to Remember (British film)
- Alec Sabin (1979) S.O.S. Titanic
- Byron Lucas (1996) Titanic
- David Elder (1997) Titanic (musical)
- Scott G. Anderson (1997) Titanic
- Jim Hope (2002) – Thumbtanic (short film)
- Aaron C. Fitzgerald (2003) Ghosts of the Abyss (Documentary)
- Scott G. Anderson (2005) (Last Mysteries of the Titanic) (Documentary)
- Ciaran Dow Jones (2008) – The Unsinkable Titanic (Documentary)
- Kaspars Karklins (2011) – Curiosity: What Sank Titanic? (TV episode)
- Jay Roberts (2012) – Titanic: Case Closed
- John Kearns (2016) – Drunk History (British TV series): Season 2: Episode 2: Scott of the Antarctic/Sinking of the Titanic
- Max Bessley Sr. (old) and Tom Brittney (young) (2023) – Fred (short film)
- Jason Kientz (2024) – Unsinkable (Film)
- Matthew Cassidy (2025) – Titanic Sinks Tonight
