= Titanic Lifeboat No. 6 =

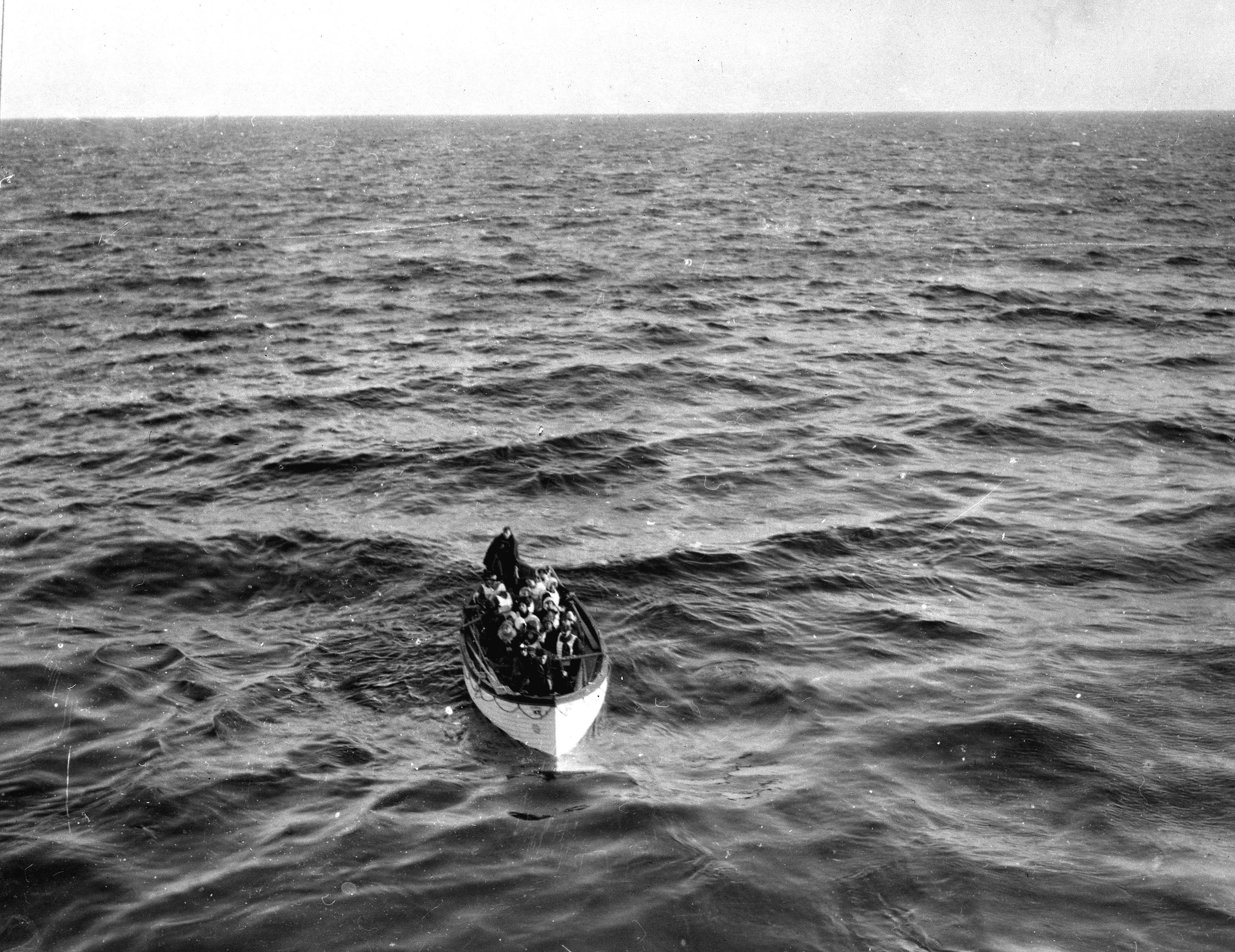
Boat No. 6 rowing towards the RMS Carpathia on 15 April 1912

Titanic Lifeboat No. 6 was a lifeboat from the steamship Titanic. It was the second boat launched to sea, over an hour and a half after the liner collided with an iceberg and began sinking on 14 April 1912. With a capacity of 65 people, it was launched with about 24 aboard.

== History ==
Boat No. 6 was one of fourteen clinker-built lifeboats and was located on the port side of the Titanic. These lifeboats on the ship had a capacity of 65.

Boat No. 6 was launched from the port side of Titanic at 1:10am, about an hour and a half after the liner collided with an iceberg and began sinking on 14 April 1912. It was the fourth lifeboat to leave the ship, and the second on the port side. The lifeboat had a capacity of 65 people but was launched with about 24 aboard. Second Officer Charles Lightoller, in charge of the evacuation effort on the ship's port side, lowered the lifeboat with the assistance of Captain Edward Smith. The passengers included American socialite Margaret "Molly" Brown, as well as British lawyer Elsie Edith Bowerman and her mother Edith, American author Helen Churchill Candee, and Eloise Hughes Smith. Crewmen in charge of the lifeboat were quartermaster Robert Hichens (put in command of the vessel) and lookout Frederick Fleet, who was ordered on board by officer Lightoller, who put him in charge of the oars. Two crew members were also rescued on Boat 6: Ruth Harwood Bowker and Mabel Elvina Martin, the two female cashiers of the à la carte restaurant staff. As Boat 6 was lowered to the sea, the women in the boat expressed concern at having only two men (Hichens and Fleet) in charge. The women's pleas forced Lightoller to look for another oarsman. In the absence of any crew member nearby, Canadian first class passenger, Major Arthur Peuchen, who was a member of the Royal Canadian Yacht Club, volunteered to join the boat and assist with his sailing knowledge. Peuchen, who got to the lifeboat shinnying down the ropes, was the only male adult passenger whom Lightoller permitted to board a boat.

The other man in the boat, Third Class passenger Philip Zenni, who was emigrating from Syria to the United States, managed to get to deck as soon as the evacuation began. He attempted to jump into a lifeboat, and was pushed back by a crew member, insisting that women and children would board first. Zenni was turned away a second time and, when the crew member turned his back to him, Zenni sneaked onto the boat and took refuge under a seat until the boat pulled away from the ship.

According to Hichens, who testified under oath before the United States Senate Inquiry, Captain Smith and officer Lightoller ordered him to row to a light seen in the horizon of the port bow (which he thought was a schooner), to drop off the passengers of the lifeboat and return to the Titanic. Hichens' behavior on board the boat was the subject of controversy, both during the night and in the aftermath. Peuchen and American passenger Smith accused Hichens of being drunk. Hichens, who remained all night at the rudder, was also accused of constantly berating those in charge of the oars (Peuchen and Fleet). More tension ensued between Hichens and the rest of the occupants of the boat, with several of them later accusing him of refusing to go back to pick survivors from the water, who reported that Hichens said that there was no point in going back, expressing that they would only find "stiffs", a term which Hichens later denied having used.

After the sinking and throughout the night, Hichens had strong arguments with Brown, who first asked him to let the women row in order to keep them all warm. When Hichens ordered her against passing the oars, Brown ignored him. Hichens tried to physically stop her, prompting a strong reaction from Brown. At one point, Hichens said that he feared being thrown overboard if they returned for survivors; Brown rose from her seat and said that she would do it herself. The occupants of the boat backed Brown, with a stoker (who had been transferred from lifeboat #16) reprimanding Hichens for being disrespectful to a woman. Candee assisted Brown with the oars, despite having her ankle injured due to a fall during the escape from the ship, while other two women, Martin and Belgian First-Class passenger Madame Mayné, kept demanding that they go back for survivors. According to Hichens, Brown began singing quiet melodies from her hometown of Hannibal, Missouri, urging the other women to do the same. He further stated that he wanted to know if anyone on the boat recognized the officer in charge of the bridge when the iceberg struck. As Hichens was ignored by the women, versions differ on what he did next. Some said that Hichens remained at the rudder, swearing at the boat's passengers until being rescued by the Carpathia, while Hichens himself testified that he sat at the boat's tiller and kept quiet until rescue at around 8:00 am, Lifeboat No. 6 being the last of the Titanic lifeboats to reach the Carpathia.

== Occupants ==
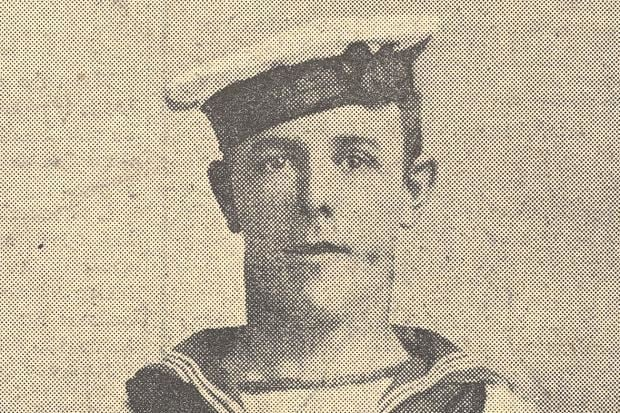
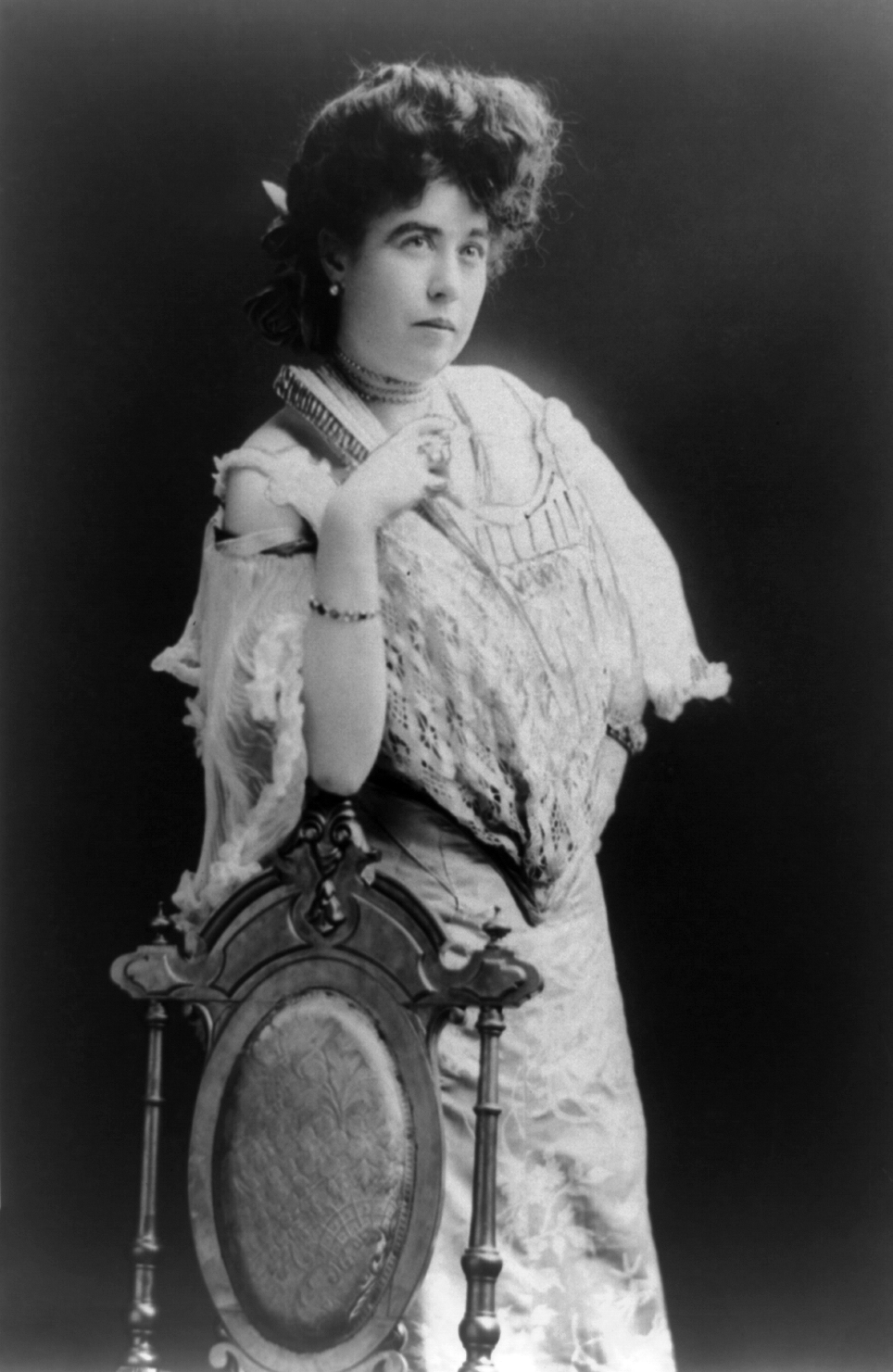
Quartermaster Robert Hichens and American socialite Margaret Brown confronted each other several times throughout the night.

The following list contains confirmed original occupants of Lifeboat 6. An unidentified stoker was later transferred from lifeboat #16, and some survivors indicated that there was an injured boy whom Captain Smith himself ordered to be let on board.

The Titanic had three classes (First, Second, and Third), aside from the crew. No Second-Class passenger boarded Boat No. 6.

First Class passenger (16 women and one man)
Third Class passenger (one man)
Crew member (two men and two women)
Total: 22 occupants.

Name	Age	Class/Dept	Notes
Barber, Miss Ellen Mary	26	First Class	Personal maid of Mr. and Mrs. Cavendish.
Baxter, Mrs. Hélène	50	First Class	Canadian woman. Saved along with her daughter Mary Hélène Douglas. Her son perished.
Bowerman, Miss Elsie Edith	22	First Class	British woman, accompanied by her mother Edith, who was also onboard lifeboat 6. Bowerman and her mother embarked on the Titanic to make a tour of the United States and Canada.
Bowker, Miss Ruth Harwood	31	restaurant staff	Cashier. One of two female staff members of the à la carte restaurant, the other being Miss Martin, who also escaped on board Boat 6.
Brown, Mrs Margaret	44	First Class	American socialite. Later known as the Unsinkable Molly.
Candee, Mrs. Helen Churchill	52	First Class	American author.
Cavendish, Mrs. Julia Florence	25	First Class	American woman. She was saved along her maid, Miss Barber. Her husband perished in the sinking.
Chibnall, Mrs. Edith Martha Bowerman	48	First Class	Saved along her daughter Elsie; both were on a tour to the United States and Canada.
Douglas, Mrs. Mary Hélène	27	First Class	Canadian woman, saved along her mother Hélène Baxter. Her brother perished.
Fleet, Mr. Frederick	24	Deck	Lookout. Ordered to man the oars by Second Officer Lightoller. Fleet was the lookout who first sighted the iceberg.
Hichens, Mr. Robert	29	Deck	Quartermaster. Put in charge of the lifeboat. Hichens was at the Titanic's helm at the moment of the collision with the iceberg.
Icard, Miss Rose Amélie	39	First Class	French woman.
Martin, Miss Mabel Elvina	20	restaurant staff	Cashier. One of the two female à la carte restaurant crew members, the other being Miss Bowker, who also escaped on board Boat 6.
Mayné, Madame Bertha Antonine	24	First Class	Belgian woman who travelled under the pseudonym of Madame de Villiers. She romantically engaged the son of Hélène Baxter and brother of Mary Hélène Douglas during the trip. Mayné pleaded Hichens and Fleet to return for the young man, but they both repeatedly ignored her.
Meyer, Mrs. Leila	25	First Class	American woman. Her husband perished.
Newell, Miss Madeleine	31	First Class	American woman.
Newell, Miss Marjorie Anne	23	First Class	American woman. Last surviving First Class passenger when she died in June 1992.
Peuchen, Major Arthur Godfrey	52	First Class	Canadian major. Member of the Royal Canadian Yacht Club. Only male passenger let on board a boat by Second Officer Lightoller.
Rothschild, Mrs. Elizabeth Jane Anne	54	First Class	American woman, saved along her Pomeranian dog, one of three dogs to survive the sinking.
Smith, Mrs. Mary Eloise	18	First Class	American woman. Her husband perished.
Stone, Mrs. Martha Evelyn	61	First Class	American woman.
Zenni, Mr. Philip	25	Third Class	Syrian-born man who allegedly sneaked onto lifeboat 6 after being repeatedly turned away.

== Consequences for the occupants and later life ==
=== Crew members ===
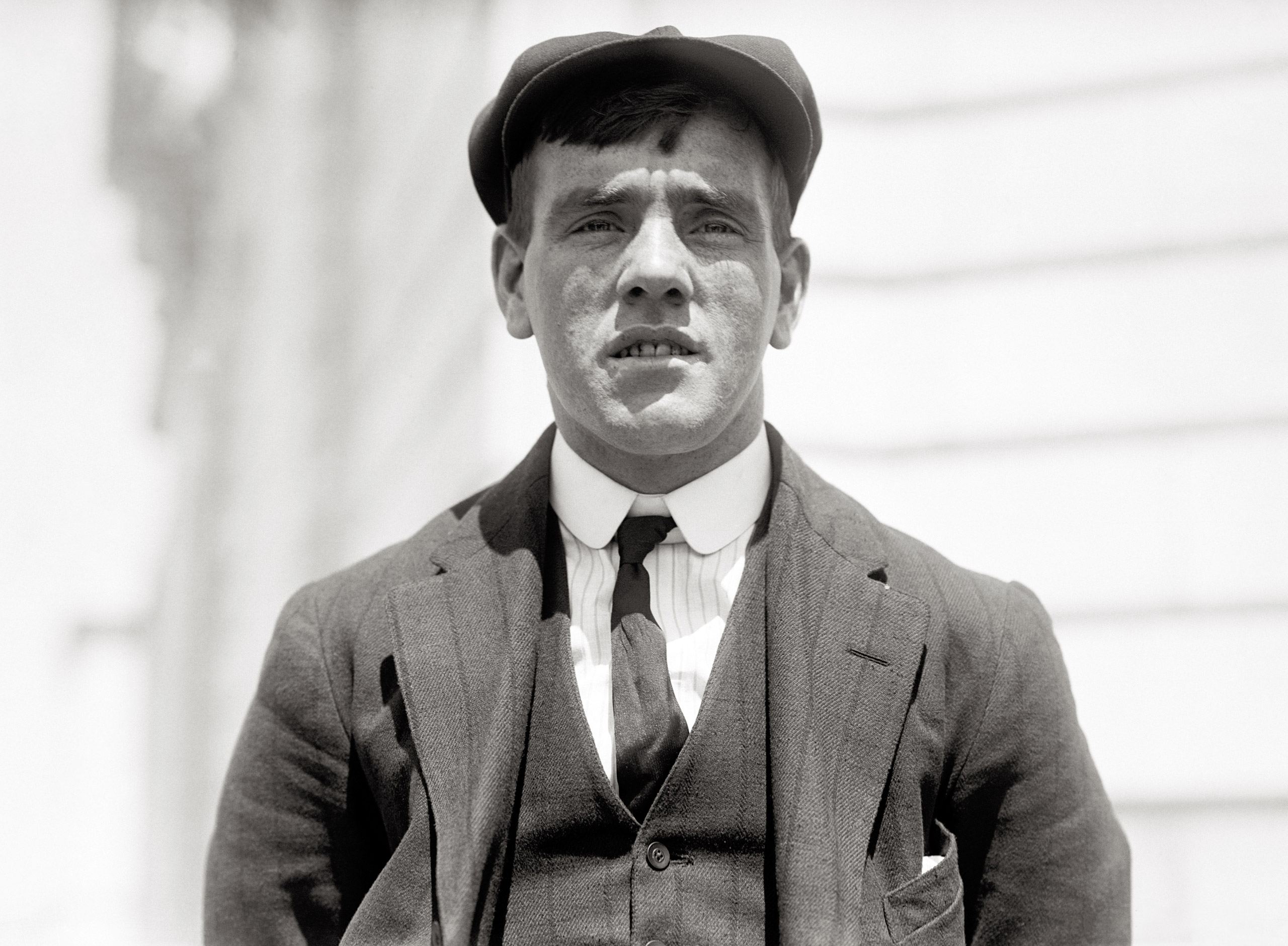
Frederick Fleet was the second seaman on board lifeboat 6 and the lookout who sighted the iceberg.

Hichens' great-granddaughter Sally Nilsson wrote a book about Hichens, where she disputes the portrayal of her great-grandfather in depictions of the Titanic sinking. Nilsson said that all the lifeboats were in the same situation, but that it was Margaret Brown who "put the nail in the coffin for Robert", when she told media that Hichens was a "coward and a bully".

Nilsson says in her book, The Man Who Sank Titanic, that Hichens was confronted several times by the women on the boat, with Helen Churchill Candee first demanding that they return for survivors, and later having a verbal exchange with Mrs. Julia Cavendish, who threatened (as Brown did) with throwing him overboard if he didn't stop berating them. The only woman who did not confront Hichens was Canadian passenger Hélène Baxter, who gave him a silver flask of liquor to keep warm.

Nilsson further wrote that Hichens moved with his wife and children to Torquay, Devon. Shortly after moving to Torquay, Hichens' wife left him and returned to Southampton. According to Nilsson, Hichens suffered from neurasthenia (a term of the times to refer to PTSD), and never recovered, spending time in jail for attempted murder and having a low-profile life until his death in September 1940, as he returned from a trip to Africa, where the SS English Trader had taken coal during the context of World War II.

The other seaman in charge of the boat, lookout Fleet, also suffered from mental health problems. Fleet, who served in both World Wars, never progressed in his maritime career, alleging that his connection to the Titanic impacted him. Following his wife's death in December 1964, Fleet fell into a downward spiral, killing himself two weeks later, in January 1965.

Both female cashiers of the à la carte restaurant of the Titanic were rescued on board lifeboat 6. One of them, Mabel Martin, led a quiet life after the sinking. She died in March 1960, when a motorist struck and severely injured her. It was ruled to be an accident, and she died on the same day at Kingston Hospital in London.

=== Passengers ===
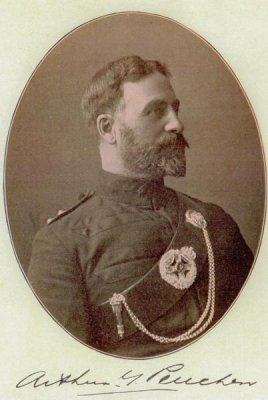
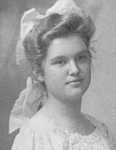
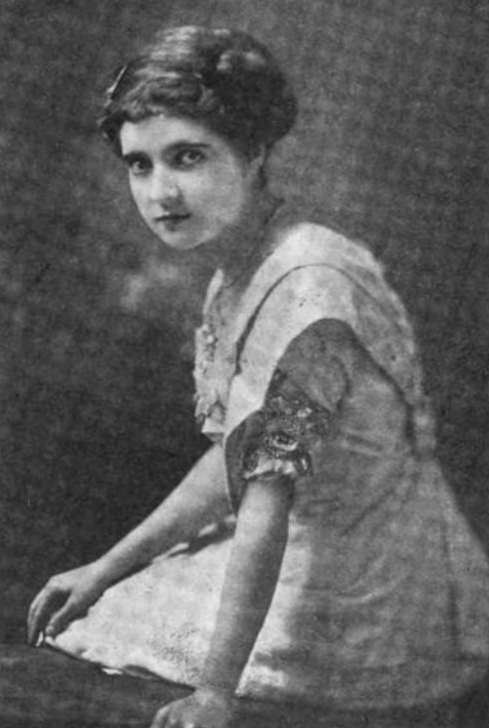
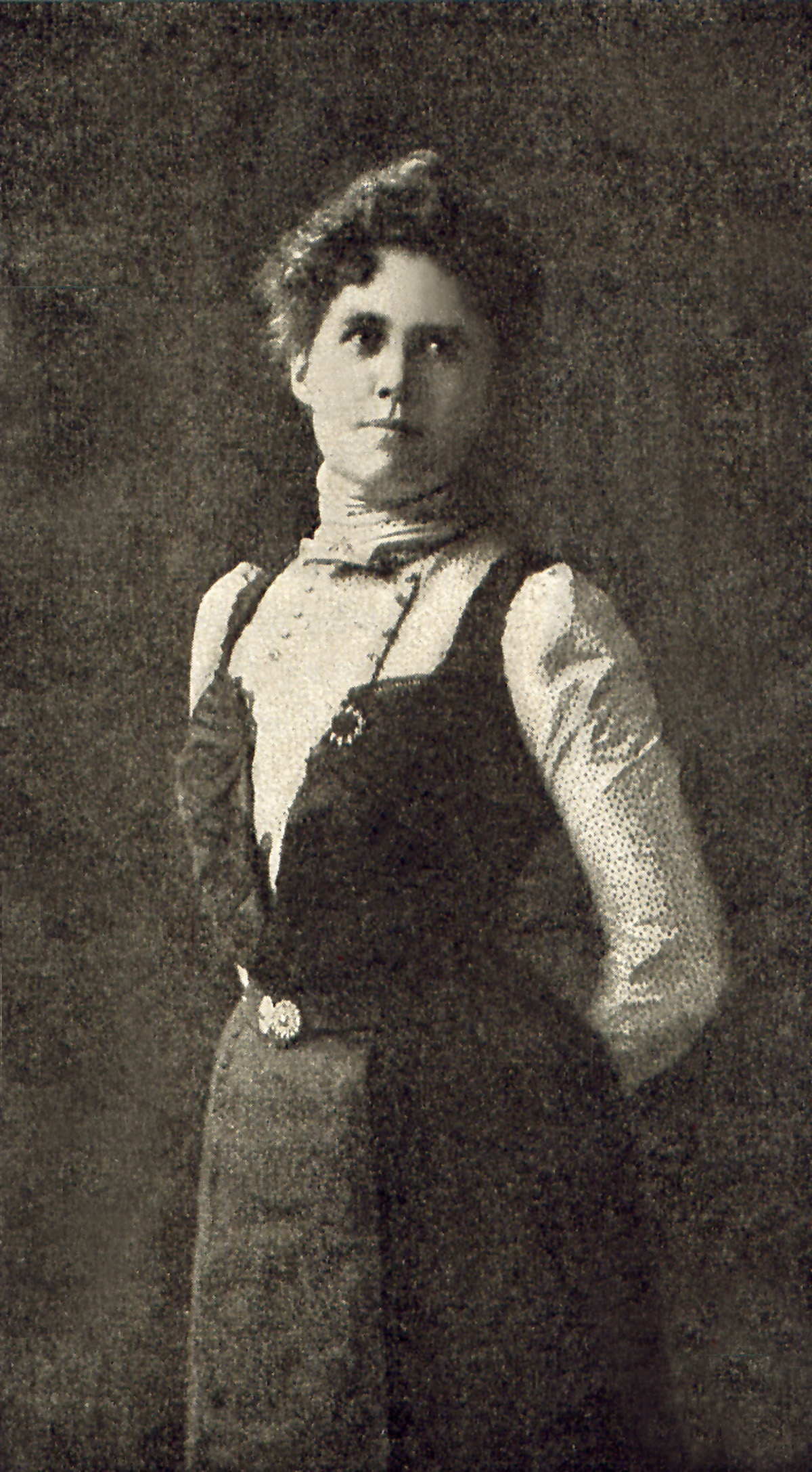
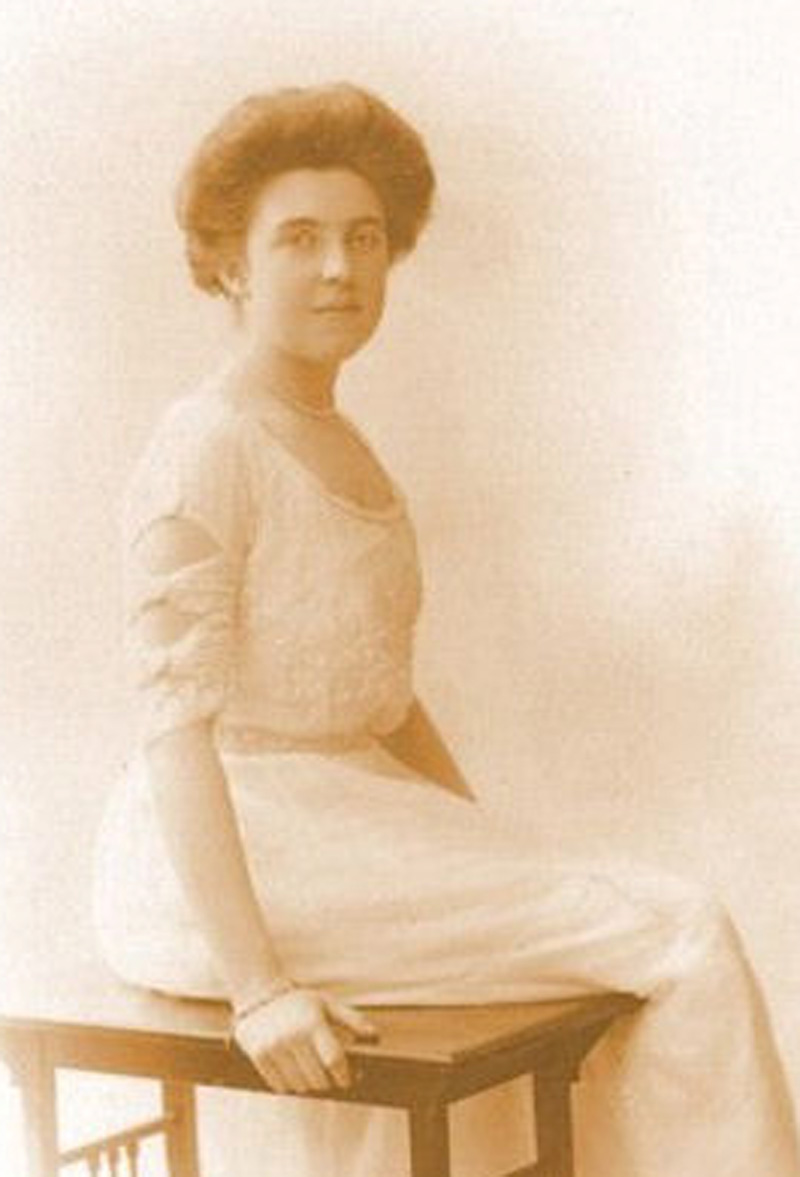
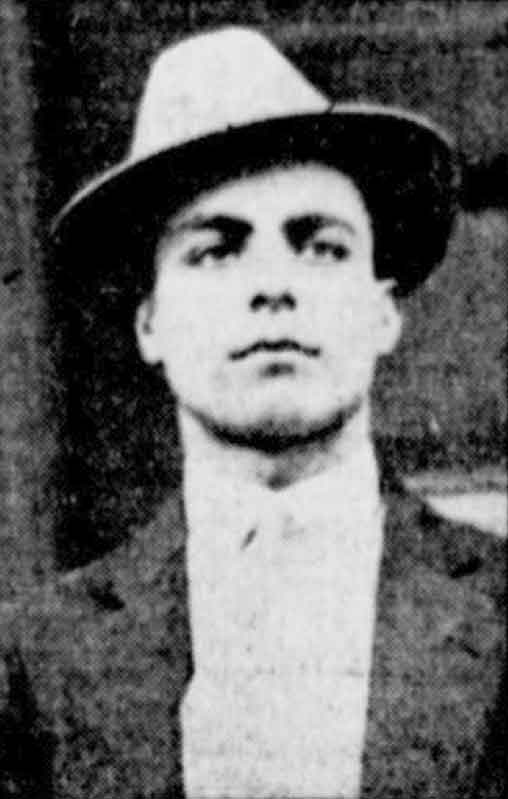
(from left to right): Canadian major Arthur Peuchen was the only adult male passenger to be let on board a boat by officer Lightoller. Marjorie Anne Newell Robb was the last surviving First Class passenger when she died in June 1992 and Eloise Hughes Smith lost her husband in the sinking. Helen Churchill Candee injured her ankle during the escape from the Titanic, while Elsie Bowerman later became a suffragette and political activist in the UK. Philip Zenni was a Syrian-born man and the only third-class passenger aboard boat 6.

Canadian major Arthur Peuchen was the only adult male passenger whom Lightoller permitted to board a boat. This impacted Peuchen later in life, having to defend himself from those who judged his survival when he returned to his native Toronto, where he was labelled as a coward. Peuchen never recovered from the event, and was a subject of a social quip in Toronto, which said that Peuchen had said "he was a yachtsman so he could get off the Titanic, and if there had been a fire, he would have said he was a fireman". Peuchen resigned from his position as president of Standard Chemical when World War I broke out and assumed command of the home battalion of the Queen's Own Rifles of Canada. His only son, Alan Peuchen, was severely injured during the war and never married. After the war, Peuchen lived as a reclusive man in Hinton, Alberta, where he spent his last years, returning to Toronto only a few weeks before his death in December 1929. His only known descendants are two of his grandnephews (grandsons of Peuchen's brother), one of whom was known to live in Youngstown, Ohio.

Marjorie Anne Newell, then aged 23, would later marry Floyd Robb in 1917, being the last surviving First Class passenger when she died in June 1992 at a home care facility in Fall River, Massachusetts. Marjorie Newell Robb only spoke about the disaster in her later life. She said that the memories of the sinking haunted her and her sister, Madeleine, who died in 1969. Their father died in the Titanic, and his body was recovered one week later. At the time of her death in 1992, she was also the last remaining survivor who had been rescued in boat 6.

Eloise Hughes Smith married fellow Titanic survivor Robert Williams Daniel in 1914, but they divorced in 1923, with Smith leading a quiet life until her premature death in 1940. Author Helen Churchill Candee worked as a nurse for the Italian Red Cross during World War I, taking care of an injured Ernest Hemingway, who was serving in the Italian front. Churchill Candee died in Maine in 1949. Elsie Bowerman and her mother stayed in the United States upon arrival in New York, travelling up north to British Columbia, Yukon, and Alaska. She returned later to the UK, where she became a suffragette, and also helped to set up the United Nations Commission on the Status of Women. Philip Zenni became known as "Mr. Titanic" in his later years in the Dayton, Ohio area.

== In popular culture ==
Boat 6 is featured in James Cameron's 1997 film Titanic during the early stages of the ship's evacuation. It includes Brown (Kathy Bates) as the newly made friend of Ruth DeWitt Bukater (Frances Fisher), a fictional character who is Rose's (Kate Winslet) mother. Rose is supposed to join her mother on Boat 6, but a classist comment made by her fiancée Cal Hockley (Billy Zane) makes her change her mind and remain on the ship to look for Jack (Leonardo DiCaprio). In another scene of the film, Brown says that there is "plenty of room for more" and appeals to the other women on the boat to return. An upset Hichens asks the boat's occupants whether they want to live or to die in the North Atlantic, then threatens and hushes Brown by telling her that "there will be one (seat) less on this boat, if you don't shut that hole in [your] face."

In a deleted scene of the 1997 film, Hichens (Paul Brightwell) is shown seated at the rudder in Lifeboat No. 6 when Captain Smith (Bernard Hill), Chief Officer Henry Wilde (Mark Lindsay Chapman) and Thomas Andrews (Victor Garber) use a megaphone to call at Boat 6, ordering Hichens to return to the ship. Margaret Brown (Bates) attempts to convince the boat's occupants to return, but a hostile Hichens tells her that he is in charge of the lifeboat and that "It's our lives now, not theirs."

== See also ==
- Titanic Emergency Boat No. 1
- Titanic Lifeboat No. 14
- Titanic Collapsible Boat A
- Titanic Collapsible Boat B
- Titanic Collapsible Boat C
- Titanic Collapsible Boat D

== Bibliography ==
- Eaton, John P.; Haas, Charles A. (1994). Titanic: Triumph and Tragedy. Patrick Stephens. ISBN 978-1-85260-493-6.
- Butler, Daniel Allen (1998). Unsinkable. Stackpole Books. ISBN 978-0-8117-1814-1.
- Barczewski, Stephanie L. (2004). Titanic: A Night Remembered. London, England, UK: A & C Black. ISBN 9781852854348.
- Nilsson, Sally (2011). The Man Who Sank Titanic The Troubled Life of Quartermaster Robert Hichens. UK: The History Press. ISBN 9780752467696.
- Wormstedt, Bill; Fitch, Tad (2011). Halpern, Sam (ed.). An Account of the Saving of Those on Board. Stroud, UK: The History Press. ISBN 978-0-7524-6210-3.
- Barczewski, Stephanie L. (2012). Titanic 100th Anniversary Edition A Night Remembered. London, England, UK: Bloomsbury Publishing. ISBN 9781441161697.
- Gracie, Archibald; Thayer, John B. (2014). Titanic A Survivor's Story & the Sinking of the S.S. Titanic. Chicago Review Press. ISBN 9780897336758.
- Hutchings, David F.; de Kerbrech, Richard P. (2011). RMS Titanic 1909–12 (Olympic Class): Owners' Workshop Manual. Sparkford, Yeovil: Haynes. ISBN 978-1-84425-662-4.
- Gleicher, David (2017). The Rescue of the Third Class on the Titanic: A Revisionist History. Liverpool University Press. ISBN 9781786949035.
- Lubin, David M. (2019). Titanic. Bloomsbury Publishing. ISBN 9781839020919.
- Medhurst, Simon (2022). Titanic: Day by Day 366 Days with the Titanic. Pen & Sword Books. ISBN 9781399011440.
- Spoelder, Yorim (2023). Visions of Greater India: Transimperial Knowledge and Anti-Colonial Nationalism, C.1800–1960. Cambridge University Press. ISBN 9781009403153.
- Bancroft, James W. (2024). Titanic's Unlucky Seven: The Story of the Ill-Fated Liner's Officers. Pen & Sword Books. ISBN 9781036102555.
- Bancroft, James W. (2025). Titanic's Lifeboats: Disaster and Survival During the Great Liner's Sinking. Pen & Sword Books. ISBN 9781036123635.
