= Unsinkable (film) =

2024 film by Cody Hartman

- Film poster
- Directed by: Cody Hartman
- Written by: Brian Hartman; Cody Hartman; Eileen Enwright Hodgetts
- Produced by: Brian Hartman and Jeff Stephan
- Starring: Karen Allen; Fiona Dourif; Jayne Wisener; Cotter Smith
- Cinematography: Jeff Garton
- Edited by: Julia Hannan; Joshua Hamaker
- Music by: Scott Glasgow
- Production companies: Hawk Hill Pictures; PMI Films
- Release date: 12 April 2024
- Running time: 100 minutes
- Country: United States
- Language: English

Unsinkable (stylised in all caps), also known as Unsinkable: Titanic Untold, is a 2024 historical drama film directed and co-written by Cody Hartman. The film tells the story about the enquiries in the aftermath of the sinking of the Titanic. Shot in Pittsburgh, the film stars Cotter Smith, Fiona Dourif, Jayne Wisener, and Karen Allen.

== Plot ==
After the RMS Carpathia arrives in New York City with the Titanic survivors, Senator William Alden Smith (Cotter Smith) has assembled in New York to guarantee the testimony of all fundamental witnesses during the sinking. Senator Smith and journalist Alaine Ricard (Fiona Dourif) investigate the tragedy as they decipher tales of hurried investigations, political intervention, and the pursuit of corporate responsibility, in addition to flashbacks to the gallantry and sacrifice on Titanic's deck during that night in April 1912.

== Cast ==
=== On the ground ===
- Cotter Smith as William Alden Smith, a U.S. Representative and U.S. Senator investigating the sinking of the RMS Titanic.
- Jayne Wisener as Maggie Malloy, Senator Smith's secretary.
- Fiona Dourif as Alaine Ricard, an investigative journalist operating under a pseudonym who investigates the inquiries.
- Karen Allen as Nancy Alice Osterhout, (named "Nancy Smith"), William Smith's wife.
- Randy Kovitz as Senator Francis G. Newlands
- Teri Clark Linden as Duchess Asconti Arese
- Larry Richert as George Uhler
- Jim Krenn as Bill McKinstry
- David Ogrodowski as Philip Albright Small Franklin (named "P.S. Franklin")
- Peter Gannon as Sheriff Joe Bayliss
- Timothy Breslin as Senator Jonathan Bourne Jr.
- John W. Iwanonkiw as Senator Charles Culp Burlingham
- Rohn Thomas as Douglas Moss
- Charles David Richards as James Bryce, 1st Viscount Bryce
- Nancy Mimless as Edith Bell
- Ben Donlow as Samuel J. Battle, NYPD Officer
- Alan Priano as Guglielmo Marconi
- Steve Herforth as Senator Duncan U. Fletcher
- Tim Hartman as William Howard Taft, 27th president of the United States

=== RMS Titanic ===
- Brendan Griffin as Second Officer Charles Lightoller
- John Yost as Arthur Peuchen
- Daina Griffith as Noël Leslie, Countess of Rothes
- Annie Kitral as Ida Straus
- Howard Elson as Isidor Straus
- Sam Turich as J. Bruce Ismay
- Jason Kientz as Lookout Frederick Fleet
- Alec Hynes as Harold Bride
- Chris Bohan as Fifth Officer Harold Lowe
- Massimo Lista as Third Officer Herbert Pitman
- Milanzo Davis as Joseph Philippe Lemercier Laroche
- Evelyn Hernandez as Maria Josefa Perez de Soto
- Christopher Mowod as Olaus Abelseth
- Henri Fitzmaurice as Frederick William Scott
- Jack Erdie as Charles Henry Pascoe

=== Other ships ===
- David Whalen as Captain Stanley Lord, captain of SS Californian
- Tom Stephens as Captain Arthur Rostron, captain of RMS Carpathia

== Fictionalization and inaccuracies ==
The film takes many liberties and invents characters who did not exist. This applies primarily to the reporter who writes under a male pseudonym. The film also invents the scene in which she is beaten up by the shipowner Morgan's henchmen. The records of the American investigation are used in part as the basis for the screenplay. Understandably, the screenplay selects and condenses the real dialogues. The film invents a conspiracy according to which the American economy interferes in the investigation. It prevents the committee from determining the responsibility of the Titanic shipping company, the White Star Line. Military aspects and relations with Great Britain are also at stake.

US President Taft intervenes and puts pressure on Senator Smith to end the investigation, this did not happen – on the contrary, Taft was very interested in the investigation because a friend of his (Archibald Butt) had died on the Titanic. At the end of the film, Senator Smith sits with his wife in the cinema and watches the news. The senator's performance is praised. Before the credits roll, the film points out that Smith's committee led to increased safety at sea. The film omits the British investigation. The investigation of the catastrophe appears to be purely American. It was a conference in London in 1914 that made the recommendations that led to increased safety at sea.

== Release ==
Unsinkable had a limited theatrical release in the United States and the United Kingdom on 12 April 2024. It was later added to popular streaming service 'Amazon Prime Video' in May.

=== Reception ===
Joshua Axelrod from the Pittsburgh Post-Gazette gave it a 3 out of 4, stating the film "is an extremely commendable and well-intentioned project that's only held back by an occasionally stodgy disposition and the rare moments when the film's seams peak through its otherwise glossy exterior." Monique Jones from Common Sense Media also gave it a positive rating, saying, "This straightforward drama is likely to entertain history buffs, especially those who've been entranced by the lore around the Titanic."

Leslie Felperin, a writer for The Guardian, gave this film 2 stars out of 5, stating "the film-makers must have been grateful that the tragedy happened in the dark because it covers up the fact that it looks like the lifeboats are being lowered into a swimming pool while a giant cutout ship capsizes in the background". Although she praised the dialogue, saying it "sounds as if it was lifted straight from the congressional record, which is curiously pleasing to the ear and adds a tang of authenticity."

== See also ==
- List of films about the Titanic
- British Wreck Commissioner's inquiry into the sinking of the Titanic
