= Robert Hichens (sailor) =

British Merchant sailor (1882–1940)

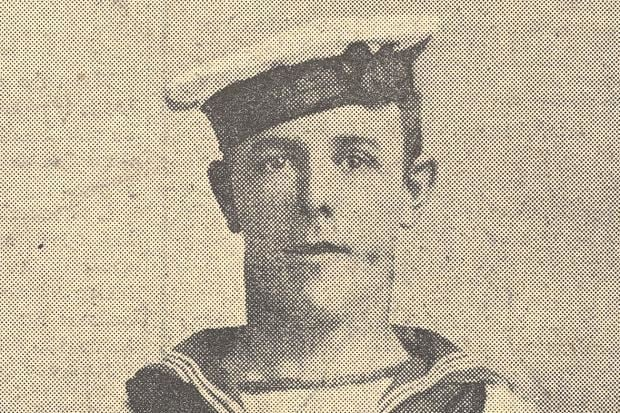
- Hichens, c. 1902
- Born: 16 September 1882; Newlyn, Cornwall, England
- Died: 23 September 1940 (aged 58); SS English Trader, off the coast of Aberdeen, Scotland
- Resting place: Trinity Cemetery, Aberdeen, Aberdeenshire, Scotland
- Occupation: Merchant sailor
- Known for: Quartermaster aboard RMS Titanic, at the wheel during time of collision
- Spouse: Florence Mortimore (m. 1906; died 1939)
- Children: 6
- Military career
- Allegiance: United Kingdom
- Branch: Royal Naval Volunteer Reserve
- Conflicts: World War I

Robert Hichens (16 September 1882 – 23 September 1940) was a British merchant sailor who was part of the deck crew on board the RMS Titanic when she sank on her maiden voyage. He was one of six quartermasters on board the vessel and was at the ship's wheel when the Titanic struck an iceberg at around 11:40 PM on 14 April.

Hichens was put in charge of Lifeboat No. 6 where, according to some occupants of the boat, including socialite Margaret Brown, he refused to return to rescue people from the water due to fear of the boat being sucked into the ocean due to any suction created by the Titanic as it sank, or being swamped by desperate swimmers. He also argued with passengers throughout the night, until the boat was picked up by RMS Carpathia, and they later accused him of being drunk. Hichens went on to testify at both the American and British inquiries into the sinking, and denied the allegations made against him.

After Titanic, Hichens spent most of the remainder of his life at sea and was often away from his family. He served in World War I in the Royal Naval Volunteer Reserve before returning to the Merchant Navy. In the 1930s, Hichens fell on hard times and the last years of his life were tumultuous. In 1933, he was jailed for attempted murder. Being released in 1937, he returned to his family and remained with his ill wife until her death in 1939. Hichens died a year later while serving aboard the SS English Trader, off the coast of Aberdeen, Scotland. Long thought to have been buried at sea, his grave was discovered in Aberdeen's Trinity Cemetery in 2012.

== Early life and career ==
Hichens was born in Newlyn, Cornwall, to Rebecca (née Wood) and Philip Hichens. He was the eldest of eight children. Hichens father was a fisherman and his mother was originally from Whitby, North Yorkshire.

Prior to Titanic, Hichens had served as Quartermaster aboard mailboats and liners for several years, including for those of the Union-Castle Line and British India Line. Hichens later stated that he had served on ships "up about Norway and Sweden and Petersburg, and up the Danube." Before he joined the Titanic, Hichens last ship aboard the troop ship SS Dongola of the P&O Line.

== Aboard RMS Titanic ==
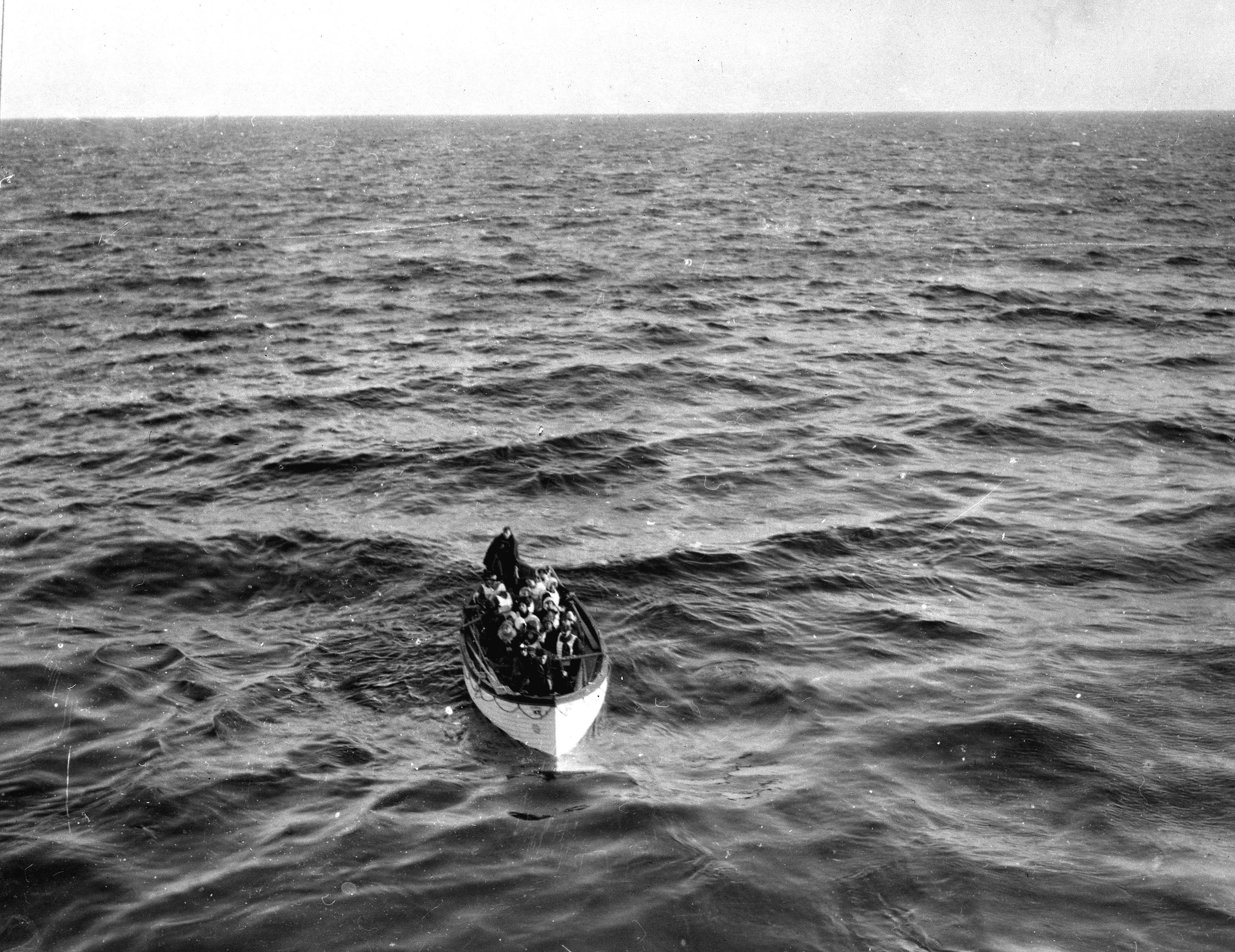
Hichens at the tiller of Lifeboat No. 6, photographed approaching RMS Carpathia

Hichens gained notoriety after the disaster because of his conduct in Lifeboat No. 6, of which he was in command. Passengers accused him of refusing to go back to rescue people from the water after the ship sank, that he called the people in the water "stiffs", and that he constantly criticised those at the oars while he was manning the rudder. Hichens was later to testify at the United States Senate inquiry that he had never used the words "stiffs" and that he had other words to describe bodies. He would also testify to have been given direct orders by second mate Charles Lightoller and Captain Edward Smith to row to where a light could be seen (a steamer they thought) on the port bow, drop off the passengers and return. Later, it was alleged that he complained that the lifeboat was going to drift for days before any rescue came. At least two Lifeboat No. 6 passengers publicly accused Hichens of being drunk: Major Arthur Peuchen and Mrs Lucian Philip Smith.

When the RMS Carpathia came to rescue Titanic's survivors, he said that the ship was not there to rescue them, but to pick up the bodies of the dead. By this time, the other people in the lifeboat had lost patience with Hichens. Although Hichens protested, first class passenger Margaret Brown told the others to start rowing to keep warm. After a last attempt by Hichens to keep control of the lifeboat, Brown threatened to throw him overboard. During the US inquiry into the disaster, Hichens denied the accounts by the passengers and crew in Lifeboat No. 6. He had been initially concerned about the suction from the Titanic and later by the fact that being a mile away from the wreck, with no compass and in complete darkness, they had no way of returning to the stricken vessel.

== Later life ==
Hichens served with the Royal Naval Volunteer Reserve during the First World War. He returned to the Merchant service, spending most of the 1920s travelling to China and Hong Kong.

Hichens moved his family to Torquay, Devon, sometime in the 1920s. In 1930, he purchased a motorboat from a man named Harry Henley and operated a boat charter. Over the next two years, Hichens traveled the country looking for work, and it is believed that he took to heavy drinking. In 1933, Hichens was jailed for attempting to murder Henley, blaming him for his troubles, and was released in 1937.

=== Death ===
On 23 September 1940, at age 58, Hichens died of heart failure aboard the ship SS English Trader, while the vessel was moored off the coast of Aberdeen in the north-east of Scotland.

Though it was thought for a long time that he was buried at sea, it was discovered in 2012 that Hichens' body was buried in Section 10, Lair 244, of Trinity Cemetery in Aberdeen.

== Claim of steering error ==
In September 2010, Hichens' name was brought back into the limelight by Louise Patten, granddaughter of second officer Charles Lightoller. In press interviews leading up to the publication of her latest novel, Good as Gold (into which she has worked the story of the catastrophe), Patten reports that a "straightforward" steering error by Hichens, brought about by his misunderstanding of a tiller order, caused the Titanic to hit an iceberg in 1912. Patten's allegation that Hichens caused the disaster by turning the ship's wheel the wrong way is not supported by testimony at both the British and US enquiries, which established that the second watch officer, Sixth Officer James Moody, was stationed behind Hichens, supervising his actions, and he had confirmed to First Officer William Murdoch that the order had been carried out correctly.

The claim was also disputed by Hichens' great-granddaughter on Channel 4 News. Sally Nilsson explained that Hichens was a well-trained Quartermaster with years of experience steering large vessels. He had been responsible on his watch for steering the Titanic for four days before the collision and would not have made such a glaring error. As to the steering orders, in 1912 they were as follows: There was only one way of giving steering orders. The order was always given with reference to the tiller. To go to port the Officer ordered starboard. The Quartermaster turned the wheel to port, tiller went to starboard and the ship turned to port. This was a hangover from the old days when ships were steered with tillers, steering oars, etc. The change in steering orders did not occur until the 1930s. Sally Nilsson's biography on the life of Robert Hichens was published in 2011.

== Cultural depictions ==
Hichens' conduct was featured in the 1997 blockbuster, Titanic, in which he was played by Paul Brightwell. He was depicted as a tall thin man with a cockney accent, when in fact he was 5' 6", had a stocky build and spoke with a pronounced Cornish accent. He was also depicted saying "if you don't shut that hole in your face" to Molly Brown, but in fact those words were spoken by a steward in Lifeboat No. 8. Deleted scenes from the film Titanic, that featured Brightwell as Hichens, was also used in Cameron's documentary film Ghosts of the Abyss, wherein he was portrayed refusing an order to return to the sinking Titanic, stating "It's our lives now, not theirs".

Hichens' conduct was also depicted in the 1996 miniseries Titanic, in which he was played by Martin Evans. Hichens is shown telling the survivors in his lifeboat to "pipe down" when they get excited about spotting a flare from a ship on the horizon. He strongly protests when Molly Brown starts encouraging the other women to row towards the light, and she threatens to throw Hichens overboard.

Hichens' negative attitude was further depicted in Diane Hoh's 1998 romance novel Titanic: The Long Night, which recounts his conduct as well as that of Molly Brown, from the viewpoint of Elizabeth Farr, a fictional lifeboat passenger. Molly Brown urged lifeboat passengers to start rowing to keep warm, and Hichens protested, declaring that he was commanding the lifeboat, and he made a move to stop her. "I will throw you overboard if you interfere," she told him in this account.

Hichens also appears in the play Iceberg – Right Ahead! by Chris Burgess, which debuted on 22 March 2012 at Upstairs at the Gatehouse. In this production, he was played by Liam Mulvey.

=== Portrayals ===
- Alan Marston (1953), Titanic
- Arthur Gross (1958), A Night to Remember (British film)
- Anthony Heaton (1979), S.O.S. Titanic
- Martin Evans (1996), Titanic
- Paul Brightwell (1997), Titanic
- Miguel Wilkins (2003), Ghosts of the Abyss (Documentary)
- Luke Norris (2012), Titanic (miniseries); the fictional seaman Holmes, shown refusing to go back, is based on Hichens.
