= James Paul Moody =

Sixth officer of RMS Titanic (1887–1912)

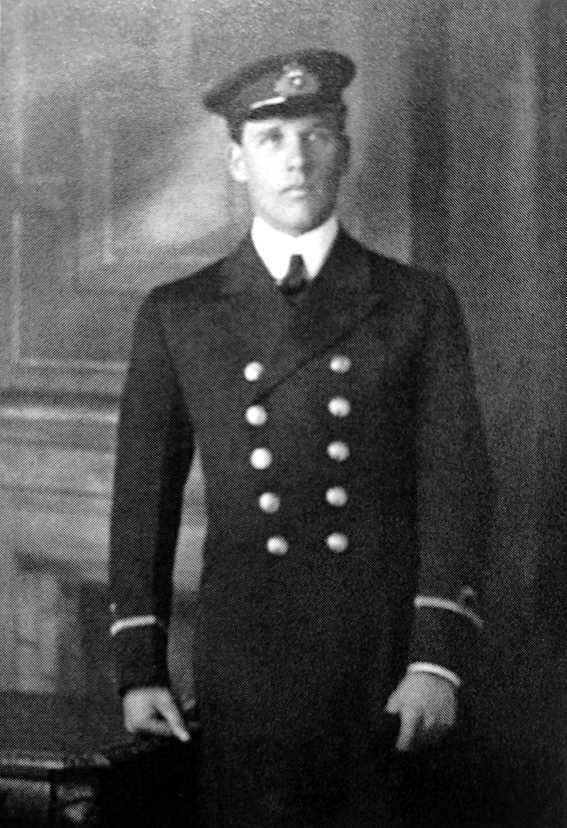
- Studio photo of Moody in his White Star Line uniform, c. December 1911
- Born: 21 August 1887; Scarborough, North Yorkshire, England
- Died: 15 April 1912 (aged 24); North Atlantic Ocean
- Occupation: Merchant seaman
- Known for: Sixth officer of the RMS Titanic

James Paul Moody (21 August 1887 – 15 April 1912) was a British merchant sailor, who served as sixth officer aboard RMS Titanic. He died when the ship sank on her maiden voyage, the only junior officer not to survive the disaster.

== Early life ==
Moody was born in Scarborough, North Yorkshire, on 21 August 1887, the youngest of four children, three boys and one girl, born to solicitor John Henry Moody and his wife Evelyn Louisa (née Lammin). Moody's grandfather, John James Paul Moody, had been Town Clerk of Scarborough.

Moody attended the Rosebery House School, where he received a prestigious education, before joining the Navy training vessel HMS Conway as a cadet in 1902. His two years in the ship, 1902 to 1903, counted as one year of sea time towards his Board of Trade Second Mate's Certification.

== Career ==
In 1904, Moody joined the William Thomas Line's Boadicea (known as Boa amongst the crew) as an apprentice, and remained on the ship for four years. His first voyage aboard to the ship, he endured a horrific, storm-troubled voyage to New York, during which the ship lost three sails. During that voyage, one of his fellow apprentices, Frank Haywood, was driven to suicide. According the letters back home, Moody noted the captain covered up the suicide when the ship reached New York City and spoke to the reporters about the horrific voyage. On the Boa, Moody would also sail to Sydney and Newcastle, Australia, rounding Cape Horn.

After passing his Second Mate's certificate exams, Moody remained aboard the Boadicea for a brief period as its second mate before leaving sail and transitioning to steamships. Writing in a letter, he remarked about leaving the sailing ship with some relief: "Don't know where the Boa is going to get and don't care if she goes where the Light Brigade charged either."

Moody's first experience on steamers were in cargo and early oil-tankers. He made numerous trips to South American ports, eventually attaining his First Mate's Certificate on the second try. After very briefly attending the King Edward VII Nautical School in 1910, a nautical cram school preparing officers for their Board of Trade examinations, he successfully obtained his Ordinary Master's Certification on his third attempt.

In August 1911, Moody joined the White Star Line and was initially assigned to the RMS Oceanic as her sixth officer. He was promoted to fifth officer by Captain Herbert Haddock during his time on the ship. Also serving alongside Moody was Charles Lightoller, first officer, and Herbert Pitman, fourth officer. Moody also befriended Oceanic's wireless operator Jack Phillips whom he referred to as a "great pal" in a letter.

In March 1912, he received word that he was to be assigned to RMS Titanic as her Sixth Officer. Moody had hoped to spend some time with an American friend in Europe and had applied for leave. However, his request for leave was denied and he joked to a friend: "We can't have big ships AND holidays!"

At the time he was appointed to serve aboard the RMS Titanic, Moody was living with his brother Christopher in Grimsby, Lincolnshire, and used the residence as his shore address.

== RMS Titanic ==
Along with the other junior officers, Moody received a message in March 1912 ordering him to report to White Star's Liverpool offices on 26 March. From there he travelled to board Titanic at the Harland & Wolff yard in Belfast on 27 March and reported to then Chief Officer William McMaster Murdoch. Writing to his sister Margaret, he said, "Have been here a week, chiefly occupied trying to find my way around the big omnibus."

Moody had only received his Master's License the previous April, but he had a broad sense of knowledge and decades of experience to look up to in his senior officers and captain. Murdoch ordered Fifth Officer Harold Lowe and Moody to inspect the starboard side lifeboats and to make sure their equipment was complete; he ordered Third Officer Herbert Pitman and Fourth Officer Joseph Boxhall to do likewise with the port side lifeboats. Titanic then sailed for Southampton to take on passengers.

On Titanic's sailing day, 10 April, Moody assisted, among other things, in aiding Fifth Officer Lowe in lowering two of the starboard lifeboats, No. 11 and 13, to satisfy the Board of Trade that Titanic met safety standards; Lowe took 11 and Moody took 13.

An often repeated story is that Moody was at the head of the last gangway connecting ship with shore, astern on E Deck, located just off the main crew thoroughfare; after Fireman John Podesta and his friend William Nutbean made it up the gangway and past the sixth officer, Moody supposedly ordered the gangplank withdrawn, and it had gotten about a foot from the side of the ship when crewmember Tom Slade, his three brothers and a trimmer named Penney arrived at the gangway. According to the story, Moody firmly refused to allow them on board despite their attempts to explain their reasons for being late. However, it is unclear whether or not Moody was the one who stopped the Slade brothers from boarding the ship. He would not have been at the gangway door just before the ship set sail as his departure station was at the Compass Platform. Lawrence Beesley, a witness to the event, referred the person at the gangway as a "petty officer" rather than a ship's officer.

Once the ship had put to sea, Moody stood the 4–5 PM watch and both 8–12 watches, which meant that he was on watch on the bridge with First Officer Murdoch and Fourth Officer Boxhall when the Titanic struck an iceberg at 11:40 PM on 14 April. On April 14, when Pitman began his watch, he noticed that several coordinates, denoting the position of wireless ice sightings had been marked on the chart and assumed that they had been made by either Boxhall or Moody. Lightoller asked Moody to use the telephone to call up the lookouts in the Crow's Nest; he wanted to have them "keep a sharp lookout for ice, particularly small ice and growlers", and to "pass that word on until daylight", as each successive shift took its turn on duty." Moody picked up the phone to the Nest in the wheelhouse and Lightoller overheard him say, "Keep a sharp look out for ice, particularly small ice.", before hanging up. Lightoller noted that Moody's order differed somewhat from the wording that he had specified, as Moody had not mentioned "growlers". Lightoller thought the detail was important enough to have Moody call the lookouts again, and to clarify that they should keep a sharp lookout for "small ice and growlers". Moody carried the order out, ringing the crow's nest a second time and conveying the order correctly this time.

=== Collision and sinking ===
After spotting the iceberg, lookout Frederick Fleet rang the warning bell three times and phoned the bridge. First Officer Murdoch and Moody heard the warning bell and the telephone began to ring. Moody picked it up immediately but did not say anything. An anxious Fleet asked, "Is anyone there?" "Yes", Moody confirmed, "What did you see?" Fleet replied, "Iceberg, right ahead!". Moody said politely, "Thank you", and relayed the warning to Murdoch: "Iceberg right ahead!" As Robert Hichens turned the helm, Moody stood beside him, watching to see the order was carried out properly. Moody called out to confirm to Murdoch, "Hard a-starboard. The helm is hard over." As the ship struck, Murdoch ordered, "Hard to port!" and Moody ensured the order was carried out promptly.

Around midnight, Moody told Quartermaster Alfred Olliver to go get the muster list for the lifeboats, and Moody was sent on his way to start preparing the aft port lifeboats. Pitman came across Moody and crew uncovering boats on the port side Boat Deck aft quarter. When Pitman asked, Moody told him that he had not seen the iceberg, but that there was ice up forward on the Well Deck. (Note: From his position inside the enclosed wheelhouse next to Hitchens at the time of the collision, Moody would have been unable to see the iceberg as it passed by.) Pitman decided to investigate for himself. Moody did not have much assistance in overseeing the preparation of the port boats. As Colonel Archibald Gracie was down on the port side of A Deck, near Boat No. 4, when Smith's orders to lower the boats were transmitted to the crew, he recalled that Moody stood with a number of other crewmen on the deck to bar any men passengers from getting near the boat, saying, "No man beyond this line." As the attempt to load No. 4 fell apart for the time being, and much of the group there dispersed, Moody headed back up the boat deck.

In the ensuing evacuation, Moody helped in the loading of Lifeboats No. 9, 12, 13, and 16. While loading No. 16, Moody ordered stewardess Violet Jessop into the boat. She described Moody as looking "weary and tired". Even so, he gave them a cheery smile, as he called out, "Good luck!", as he guided her and her cabin-mate into the boat; Moody then hailed her and gave her a baby to look after, saying, "Look after this, will you?". Moody then ordered the boat lowered away.

While loading No. 16, Fifth Officer Lowe came across from the starboard side and asked Moody what he was doing. Moody said he was getting the boats away and Lowe took over the loading of No. 14 where there had been attempts to rush the boat. After No. 14 was filled, Lowe and Moody conferred and agreed that an officer should man the lifeboats. When Lowe asked Moody who it was to be — him or Moody — Moody told Lowe to take it, saying "You go; I will get in another boat." Able seaman Joseph Scarrott, who was in charge of No. 14 before Lowe's arrival, testified that Lowe followed up by telling Moody, "All right, you go in that boat and I will go in this." referring to No. 16. However, Moody never took No. 16 or get into another boat.

Moody went to the starboard side and assisted Reginald Lee, who was Fleet's fellow lookout, in loading lifeboat No. 13, before ordering him to man it. 12-year-old Second Class passenger Ruth Becker was placed in this boat by Moody after being prevented from entering the heavily overloaded lifeboat number 11 which her mother and two siblings had boarded. Moody noticed May Futrelle as she headed up to the boat deck and asked, "What are you doing below, Mrs Futrelle? All the women are gone," and led her up the stairs. He ignored her protests of him pulling her and took her to boat No. 9. He stayed to assist at boat 9. Moody instructed Quartermaster Walter Wynn to go in the boat and to take charge of it. Just as it began lowering away, Murdoch countermanded Moody's order, instructing Boatswain's Mate Albert Haines to take command. Wynn relinquished control to Haines, and entered the boat. Moody ordered Saloon Steward Littlejohn and crewman to get in to help row the boat.

=== Death ===
Moody was last seen by the ship's lamp trimmer, Samuel Hemming, on top of the officers' quarters helping to launch Collapsible A, an emergency lifeboat, just before the ship began its final plunge. Hemming helped untangle the falls, and passed the block up to the roof. Moody called back down, "We don't want the block. We will leave the boat on deck." Moody's opinion that the boat should be left to float free was apparently overruled but turned out to be correct as water washed over the deck. Collapsible Boat A reached the deck and was being attached to the falls when it was washed off Titanic by the wave washing over the boat deck. Lightoller, who was also on top of the quarters clearing away Collapsible Boat B on the port side, though he said he did not remember seeing Moody, surmises that Moody must have been engulfed along with the crewmen attempting to launch collapsible A and B when the water came up onto the boat deck and washed over the bridge.

Moody perished when ship foundered; along with some individuals who had perished, he was mistakenly at first listed as survived. His body, if recovered, was never identified.

== Legacy ==
A monument in Dean Road / Manor Road Cemetery, Scarborough, commemorates Moody's sacrifice on the Titanic. He is also commemorated by a Blue plaque at 17 Granville Road Scarborough, the house where he was born, and a commemorative plaque in St Martin's Church in Scarborough.

He is also commemorated by a brass altar set presented by his aunt, Hannah Mountain, to the church of St Augustine of Hippo, Grimsby.

=== Portrayals ===
- Michael Bryant — A Night to Remember (1958)
- In the 1996 miniseries Titanic, Moody's role is merged with that of Fourth Officer Joseph Boxhall, who is inaccurately portrayed as dying in the sinking.
- Edward Fletcher — Titanic (1997)
- Edward Fletcher — Last Mysteries of the Titanic (2005)
- Jonathan Howard — Titanic (2012)
- Darren Crawford - Titanic: Sinking the Myths (2017)
