= Lucille Douglass =

American painter, etcher, and lecturer

Lucille Sinclair Douglass
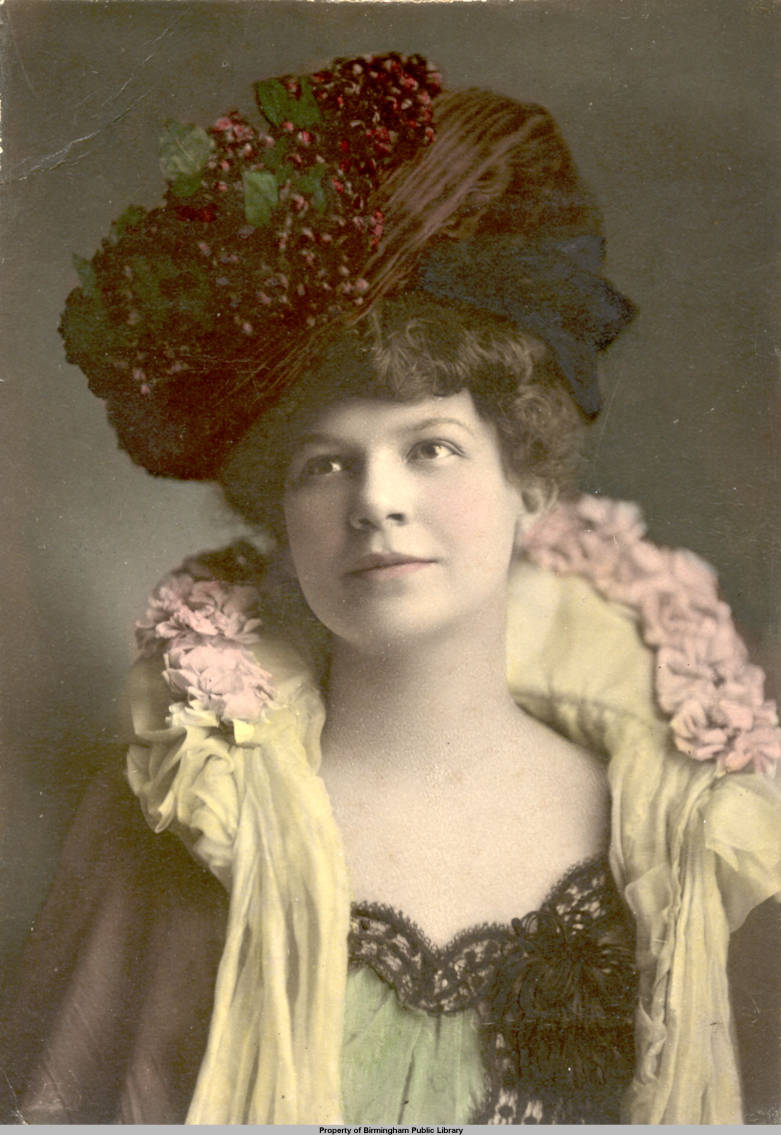
- Born: November 4, 1878; Tuskegee, Alabama
- Died: September 26, 1935 (aged 56); Andover, Massachusetts
- Occupations: Artist and traveller
- Known for: Etchings, pastels and watercolors
- Notable work: Pastels, Etchings, of Cambodia and China, 1928

Lucille Douglass (November 4, 1878, Tuskegee, Alabama - September 26, 1935, Andover, Massachusetts) was an American painter, etcher, and lecturer. She traveled in, depicted and spoke about Cambodia and China. In 1928 Douglass was described by the New York Evening Post as "one of America's best known painters and etchers". Her works are included in the Metropolitan Museum of Art, the Birmingham Museum of Art and the British Museum, among others.

== Early life ==
Lucille Sinclair Douglass was born on November 4, 1878, in Tuskegee, Alabama, to Civil War veteran Walton Eugene Douglass and Mary Sinclair (Mollie) Douglass. The family's situation has been described as "genteel poverty" characteristic of the postbellum South. Often sickly during her childhood, Lucille Douglass read exotic travel books such as the Zig-Zag Journeys of Hezekiah Butterworth. She took art lessons from her mother, who taught at Alabama Conference Female College (later Huntingdon College). In 1895, Douglass received her A.B. from Alabama Conference Female College.

== Career ==
In 1899 Douglass moved to Birmingham, working as an artist and art teacher. She supported herself in part by painting china and place cards. From 1901 to 1908 she had a studio in the Watts Building. In 1908 she formed the Birmingham Art Club with seven other female artists, who included Delia Dryer, Hannah Elliot, and Carrie Hill. She studied at the Art Students League of New York in the summers.

Douglass went to Europe for further art training from 1909 to 1912. Her teachers in Paris included Lucien Simon, René Menard and Alexander Charles Robinson. She became Robinson's assistant, and traveled with his classes to the Netherlands, Spain, Italy and North Africa. In 1911, she had two exhibitions of her paintings in Paris.

“You have less talent than many, but you will go farther than the rest because once you undertake a thing you see it through.” Alexander Robinson to Lucille Douglass

By 1913 Douglass was back in the United States. She spent a summer with artist Isabelle Percy (later West) in Oakland, California. During World War I travel was not an option for her.

In 1920, Douglass went to China as an employee of the Board of Foreign Missions of the Methodist Episcopal Church. She organized and supervised a workshop in Shanghai, where Chinese women hand-colored photographic slides for the missionary society. Women were intentionally chosen as employees and were given opportunities to learn English and in some cases tuition to attend school. Douglass also became a writer and associate editor of Shanghai Times, an English-language publication.

Douglass formed close friendships with writers Florence Wheelock Ayscough and Helen Churchill Candee. Douglass would eventually illustrate books for both of them, including Ayscough's Waterways of China, Firecracker Land: Pictures of the Chinese World for Younger Readers, and A Chinese Mirror.

Helen Churchill Candee, a survivor of the RMS Titanic, was an intrepid traveler. Candee and Douglass traveled throughout the Far East together in 1926 and January 1927. Their itinerary included Indochina, Siam, Java and Bali. It became the basis of Candee's book, New Journeys In Old Asia (1927), which was illustrated with twenty-one of Douglass' etchings. Douglass also published Pastels, Etchings, of Cambodia and China, 1928. One of the places the two women visited was Angkor Wat, which had a strong effect on Douglass. She wrote to a friend,

“Angkor is one of the really great experiences of my life-a more intellectual than emotional experience — not that it left me cold, quite the contrary — but it was more of an uplift — an inspiration... — Angkor Wat alone requires years of study — living with understanding — a few days seems but a mockery." Lucille Douglass, 1926

For the rest of her life, Douglass lived primarily in New York, traveling to Europe and Birmingham. During the winter of 1928–1929, she was a faculty member on the SS President Wilson, teaching art history, drawing and painting on a "floating university" that sailed around the world. In the New York Evening Post of November 6, 1928, Douglass was referred to as "one of America's best known painters and etchers".

Douglass died on September 26, 1935, in Andover, Massachusetts, where she was staying with friends. She had been ill for several months. Her remains were cremated and her ashes were taken to Angkor, which Douglass had first visited on her 1926-27 trip with Candee. There her ashes were spread around a mango tree. Following her death, several exhibitions of Lucille Douglass's works were held in New York galleries and in Birmingham.
