= St Augustine of Hippo, Grimsby =

Church in Grimsby, Lincolnshire, England

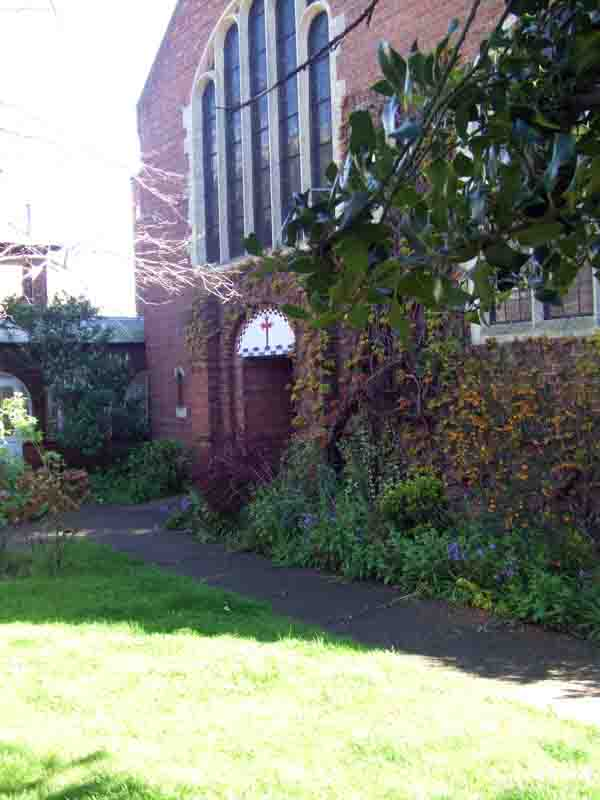
The West Front

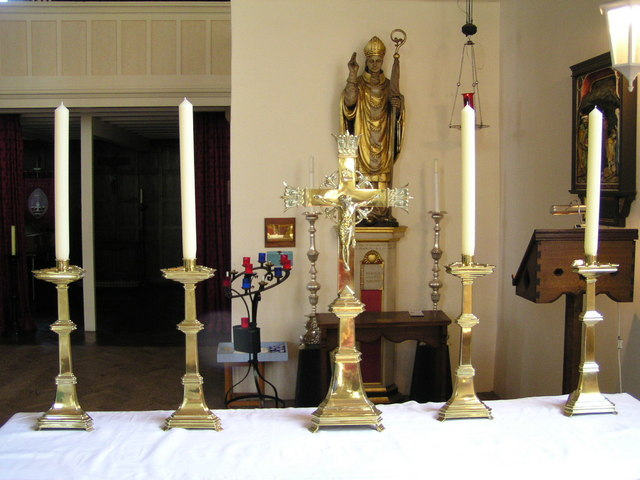
James Paul Moody's memorial altar set

The Church of England Parish of St Augustine of Hippo, Grimsby was formed on 14 May 1912 by taking 85 acres from the Parish of St Mary & St James, Grimsby and 255 acres from the Parish of the Holy Trinity and St Mary, Old Clee. It was under the patronage of St Augustine of Hippo. The church was dedicated in November 1911 and consecrated on 28 March 1912. The Vicar of Grimsby is the patron of the living and Frank Bloomer was the first vicar of the new parish, until his death in 1938.

St Augustine's was designed by Sir Charles Nicholson. The style reflects the Anglican Catholic tradition. The north aisle, also to a design by Nicholson, was added in 1935. The church has been designated a grade II listed building.

An altar set was presented as a memorial to James Paul Moody, 6th Officer on the Titanic.

The organ is an instrument by the noted Hull manufacturer of Forster and Andrews. It was restored and new stops were added in 2010.

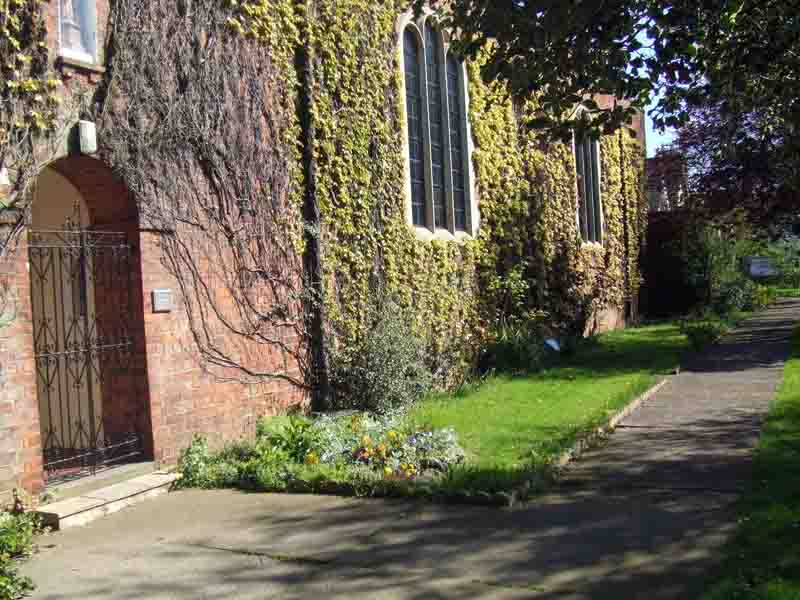
