= Marjorie Anne Newell =

American Titanic survivor (1889–1992)

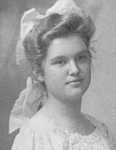
- Marjorie Anne Newell as a young girl
- Born: 12 February 1889; Lexington, Massachusetts, United States
- Died: 11 June 1992 (aged 103); Fall River, Massachusetts, United States
- Known for: Last surviving first class passenger of RMS Titanic
- Spouse: Floyd Newton Robb (m. 1917; died 1957)
- Children: 4

External videos
- A 1986 interview with Newell about the Titanic disaster. on YouTube

Marjorie Anne Newell (12 February 1889 – 11 June 1992) was an American first class passenger on the RMS Titanic during her maiden voyage. She survived the sinking and at the time of her death was the last surviving first class passenger of the disaster.

== Early life ==
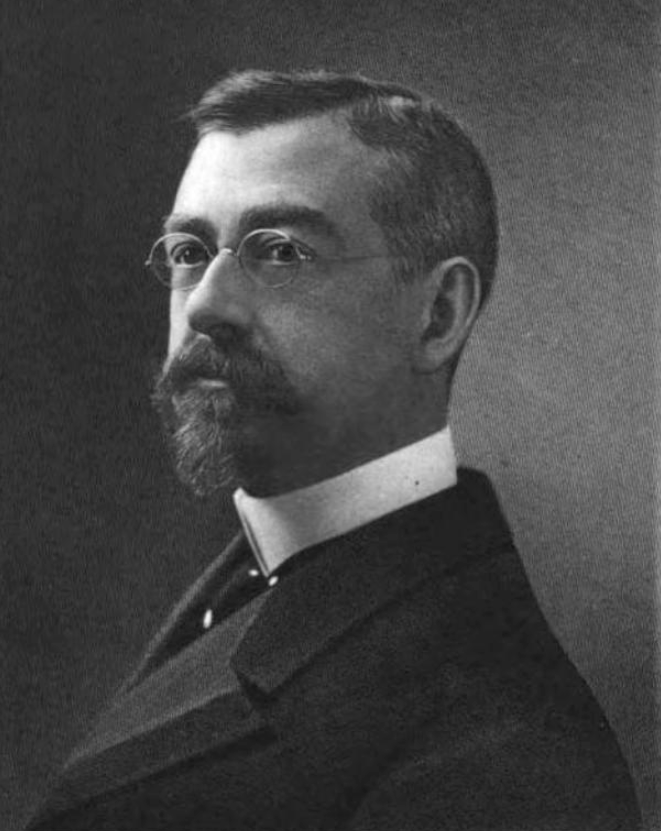
Marjorie's father Arthur Webster Newell

Marjorie Anne Newell was born on 12 February 1889 as the youngest of three daughters of Boston banker Arthur Webster Newell and Mary E. Greeley. In February 1912 Marjorie joined her father and older sister Madeleine on a voyage to Egypt and the Holy Land, celebrating her 23rd birthday in Cairo by the great pyramids. From there on, they travelled to Palestine and visited Jaffa, Bethlehem and Jericho among others. After touring the Middle East, the travel party headed for the Holy Land, followed by Marseille and Paris in preparation to return home to America. In April 1912, while on a train bound for Cherbourg, Arthur Newell surprised his daughters with first class tickets for the RMS Titanic for their return trip to New York City.

== Aboard the Titanic ==
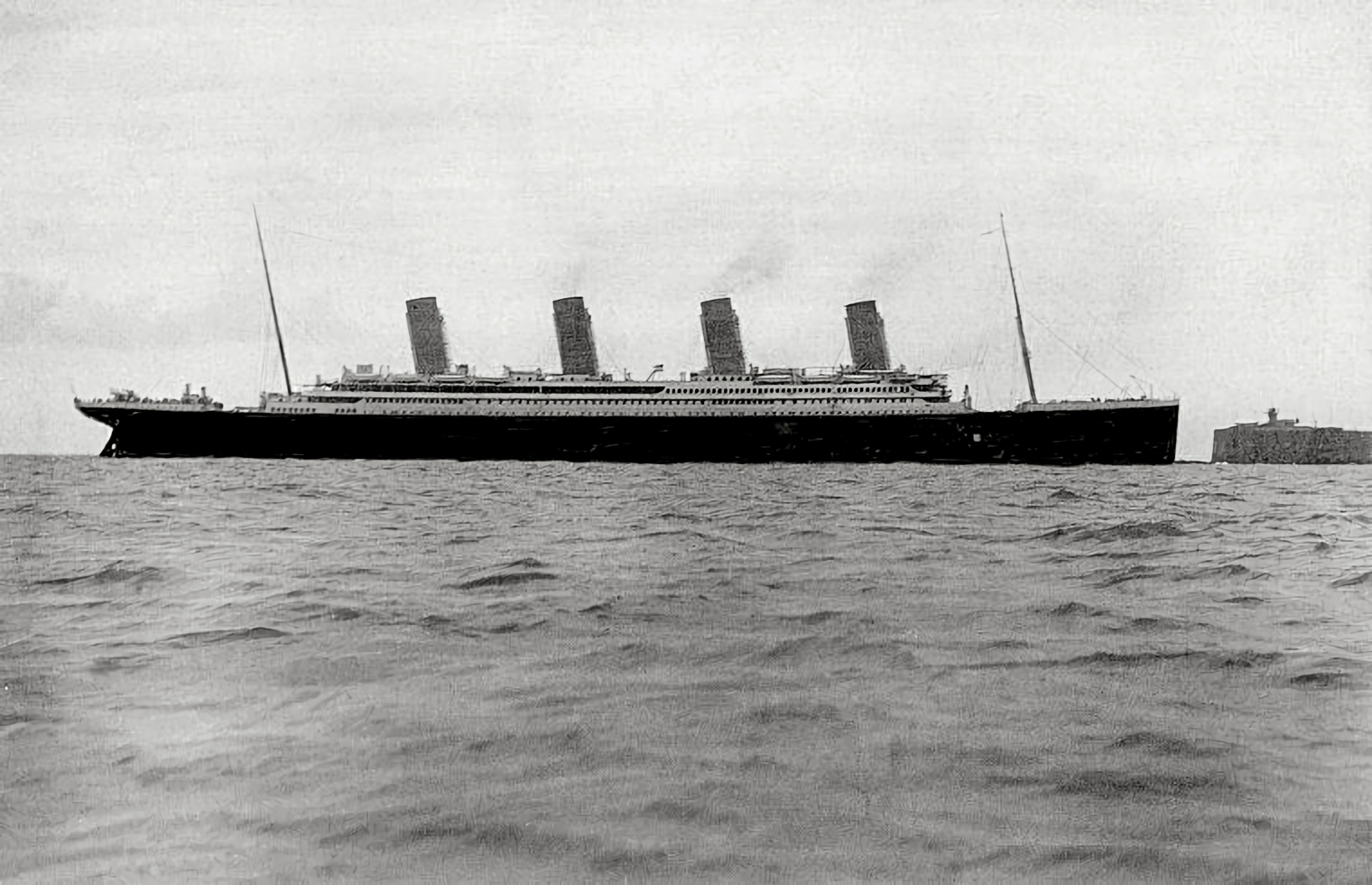
RMS Titanic at Cherbourg on 10 April 1912

The Newell family boarded the RMS Titanic at Cherbourg on the evening of 10 April 1912, conveyed aboard the SS Nomadic. Marjorie described the ship as beautiful and a massive affair in every way with fine furniture, panelling and carving of the finest quality. Marjorie stayed in stateroom D-36 along with her sister Madeleine while her father occupied cabin D-48. The sisters had brought their violins with them and would practice playing them every night an hour before going to bed. On the afternoon of 14 April, Marjorie and her family sat in deckchairs and discussed all the ancient sights they had visited on their voyage to the Middle East. That evening, Marjorie wore the first long train gown that she had been giving when she left home to dinner and marveled at the beautiful gowns being worn by the other ladies. Following a lavish dinner, Marjorie joined her family in the reception room when her father pointed out John Jacob Astor and his wife walking by before he joked to his daughters whether they would last until morning, referring to their healthy appetites. At 10.30 pm, the family decided to retire to their cabins.

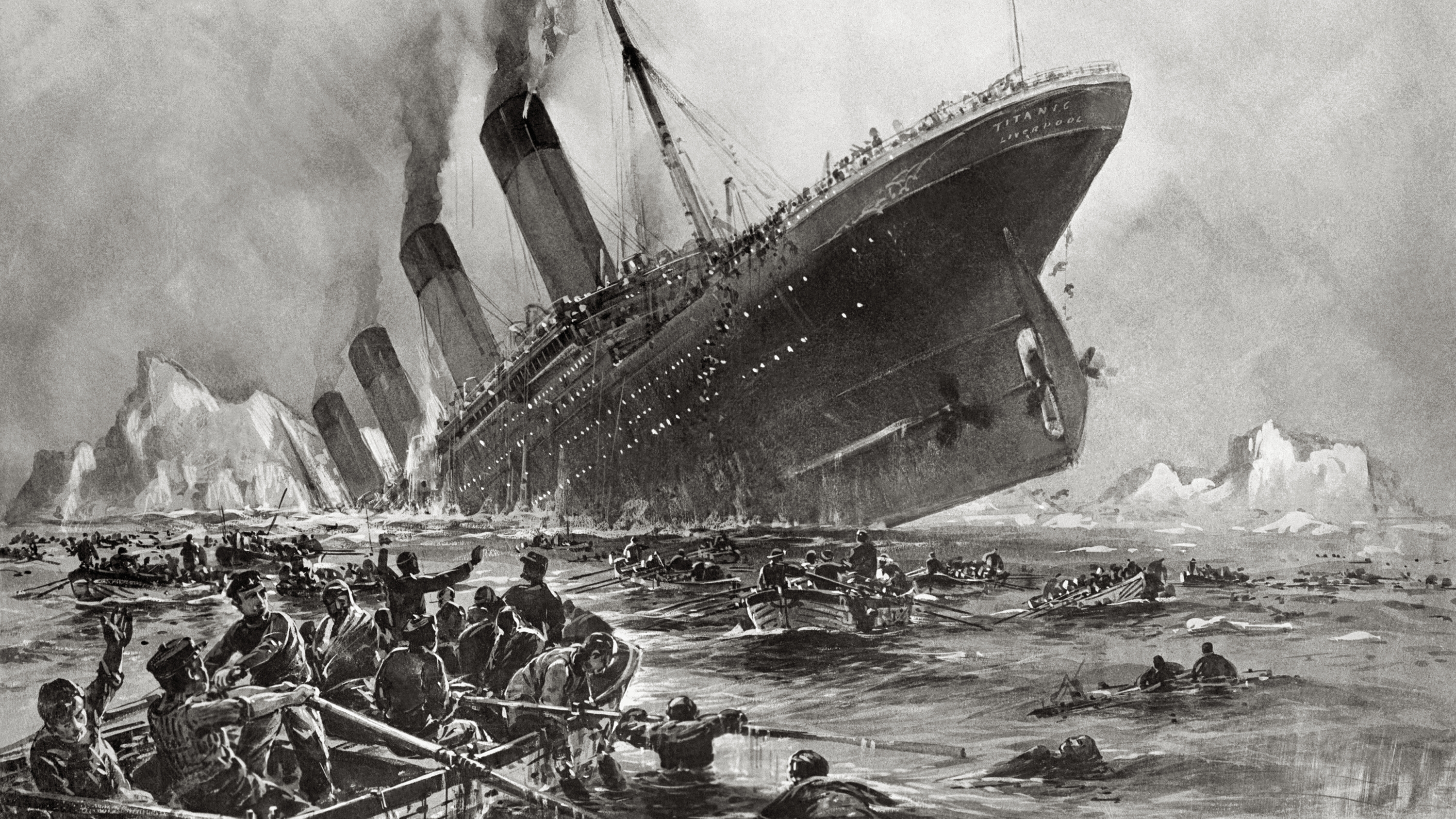
Titanic sinking on 15 April 1912

That night at 11.40 pm, the RMS Titanic struck an iceberg and began to sink. At the time of the collision, the sisters were sleeping in their stateroom on the port side of D deck, but were awoken by a great vibration and a terrific noise which Madeleine would go on to compare to an earthquake. While they were wondering what had caused the event, a knock came at the door before Marjorie's father came into the cabin and told his daughters to put on warm clothes and come up to the boat deck. The sisters did as their father instructed and reached the boat deck early into the evacuation. Marjorie noticed that the boat deck was almost empty and that the Titanic seemed to have taken on a list, while the ship's orchestra was playing music on deck. At some point Marjorie learned that the ship had struck an iceberg, although she did not believe the ship was sinking. Her father took her and her sister to lifeboat No. 6 after witnessing the lowering of lifeboat No. 8. He said that he'd rather have his daughters stay on the safer Titanic than on the dangerous lifeboats in the middle of the Atlantic, yet still saw to it that his daughters were allowed onto the lifeboat. Her father was denied entry by Second Officer Lightoller and was left behind as the boat was launched at 12.55 am with only 24 out of her 65 seats occupied, Marjorie saw her father calmly waving her and her sister off as he reassured them that he'd follow in another lifeboat. After the boat was lowered, Marjorie alongside several other women helped to row it as there were only four men amongst the lifeboat's occupants, which were not enough to row the boat on their own. Once the lifeboat was about a mile away from the Titanic, they stopped rowing as they no longer feared being pulled under by the suction of the sinking liner. Marjorie noticed how every porthole on Titanic was illuminated before the lights failed and a terrific noise seemed to come from the sinking ship as if the engine room had exploded. Marjorie saw the ship slip beneath the waves with a great rush of water and would go on to never forget the terrible screams and cries coming from those left in the freezing ocean.

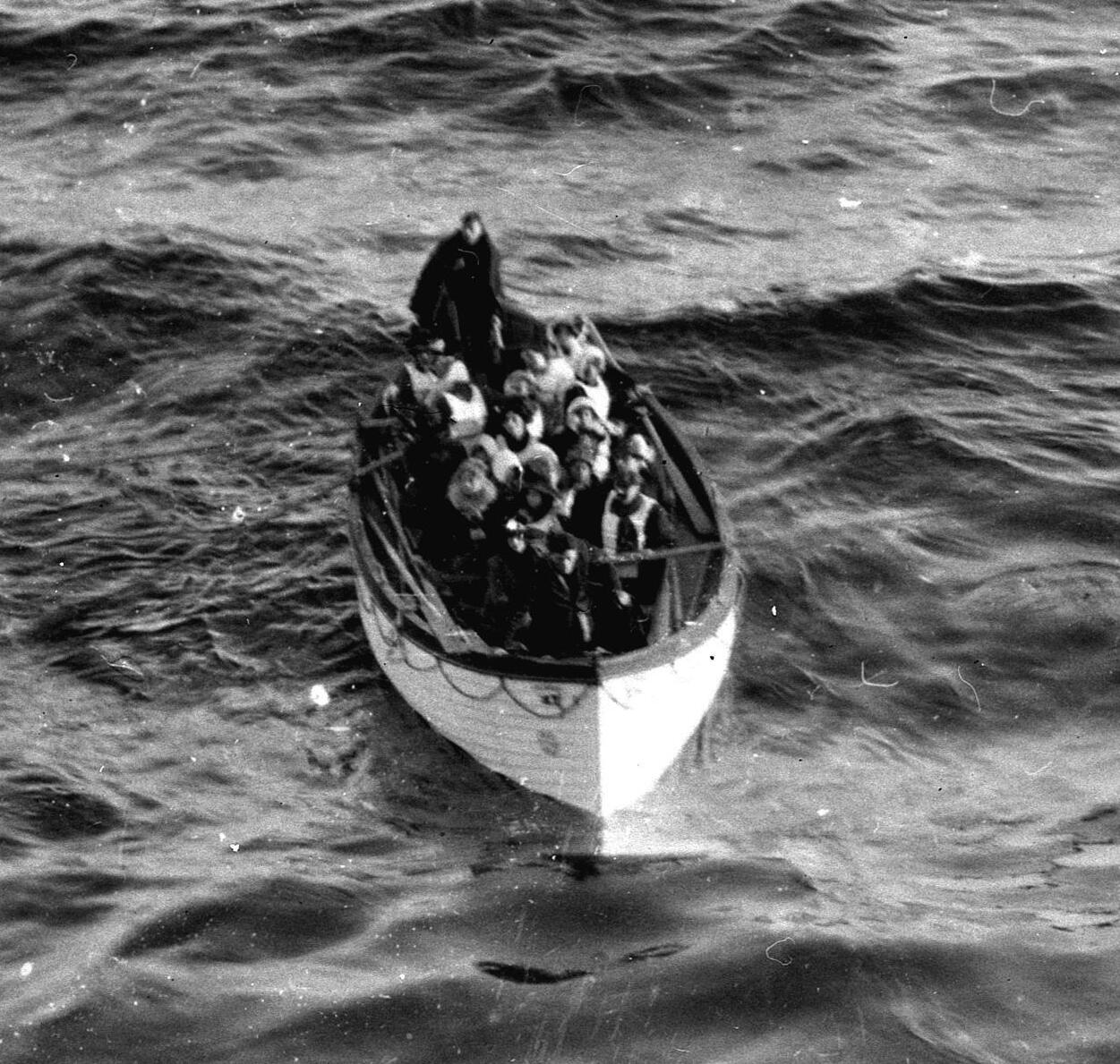
Lifeboat No. 6 nearing the rescue ship Carpathia

By the time dawn arrived, Marjorie noticed the many icebergs that seemed to surround the area before the rescue ship RMS Carpathia arrived. Lifeboat No. 6 rowed to the Carpathia and Marjorie and her sister climbed the rope ladders to board the ship. There, Marjorie expected to reunite with her father, not yet realising the scale of the disaster. As the Carpathia made her way back to New York after having picked up all of Titanic's survivors, Marjorie's father was listed among the missing. Upon the sisters' arrival in New York on 18 April, a friend of her father awaited the women at Pier 54 and escorted them to the Hotel Manhattan so they could reunite with their mother and sister. Their mother had already learned of her daughters' survival through the available survivors list and hoped that her husband's name hadn't been added due to a simple oversight. In the hotel corridor, their mother gave a howl of despair upon learning her husband hadn't survived the sinking. Her mother turned down an offer of a settlement from the White Star Line and forbade her daughters from ever speaking of the Titanic disaster. Despite the family being in mourning, Marjorie felt proud of her father as he had abided by the rule of the sea and let the women and children be saved first. Her father was the 122nd body recovered by the CS Mackay-Bennett and was shipped home to Lexington, Massachusetts, after having been prepared for travel by undertaker Frank Newell, who was Arthur's nephew and was the first body he had been assigned to prepare, after discovering it was his own uncle, Frank fainted. Arthur was buried at the Mount Auburn Cemetery in Cambridge, Massachusetts, on 4 May 1912. For the rest of her life, Mary Newell slept with his pocket watch under her pillow.

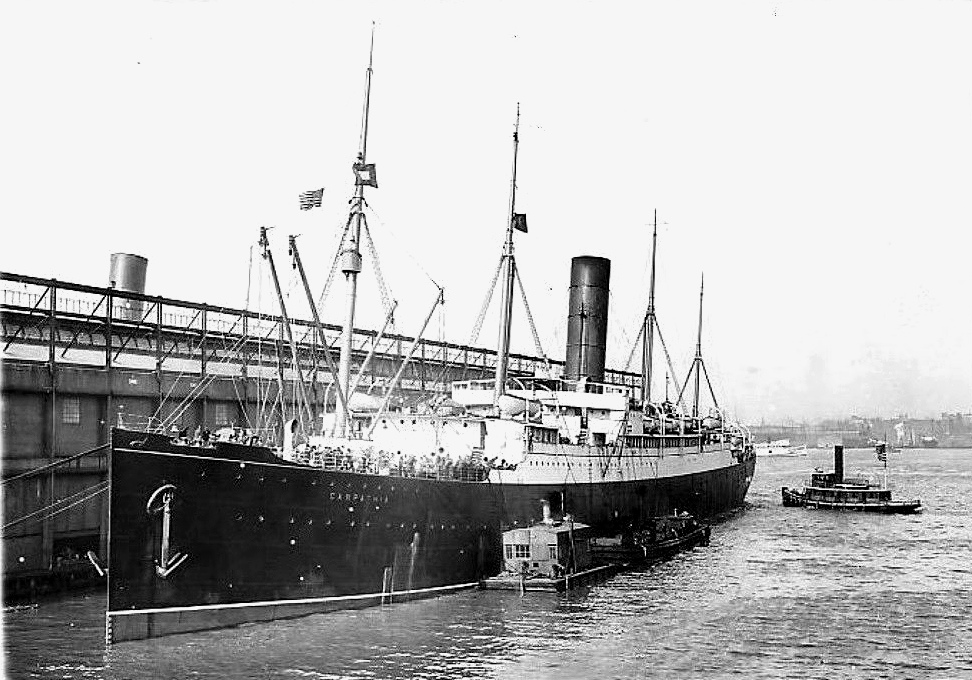
RMS Carpathia in New York on 18 April 1912

== Later life ==
Marjorie went on to work as a music instructor and social worker in Chicago. While there, she met her future husband Floyd Newton Robb, whom she married in 1917; she went on to have three daughters and one son with him. She named her son Arthur Newell Robb in memory of her late father. Marjorie returned to the East Coast and moved to South Orange, New Jersey, in 1920 before she became a music instructor at Wells College in Aurora, where she taught violin and piano. She also became a founding member of the New Jersey Symphony Orchestra. Marjorie's husband built a house in Westport Point, Massachusetts, in 1952 and the couple moved there that same year. Her husband passed away in 1957, followed by her mother, also in 1957, at the age of 103. In 1960, Marjorie visited Litchfield, England, the home town of Captain Smith and visited the town's cathedral and statue dedicated to Captain Smith. While she was listening to the organ music in the cathedral, she was very moved and the experience gave her the solace she needed to begin to move on from the Titanic disaster. Marjorie made a further 17 trips to Europe in the 1960s, including spending many summers in Le Prese, Switzerland, while she spent the winter months near one of her daughters in California. Alongside another one of her daughters, Marjorie briefly ran an antiques business in New England.

Her sister Madeleine died in 1969 followed by her other sister Alice in 1972. Throughout the years, Marjorie had respected her mother's wishes to not discuss the Titanic with anyone until the 1980s, when she began giving interviews and public presentations about her survival out of respect and honor for her lost father. Following the discovery of the wreck of the Titanic in 1985, Marjorie commented that there were no people left to be saved and that the great ship should be left undisturbed as a memorial to all those who perished, while also adding that she never believed that the ship would be found within her lifetime and called the discovery unimaginable. Following the death of John Borie Ryerson in 1986, Marjorie became the last surviving first class passenger of the Titanic. Marjorie attended several conventions held by the Titanic International Society and the Titanic Historical Society, to speak about her experiences on board the doomed ship to many Titanic enthusiasts. Marjorie would move a final time to a retirement home in Fall River in 1990 at the age of 101, that same year her eldest daughter passed away.

== Death ==
Marjorie passed away in her sleep on 11 June 1992 in Fall River, Massachusetts at the age of 103. At the time of her death, she was the last surviving first class passenger of the Titanic and the second longest lived Titanic survivor behind Mary Davies Wilburn, who had died in 1987 at the age of 104.
