= Helen Churchill Candee =

American novelist (1858–1949)

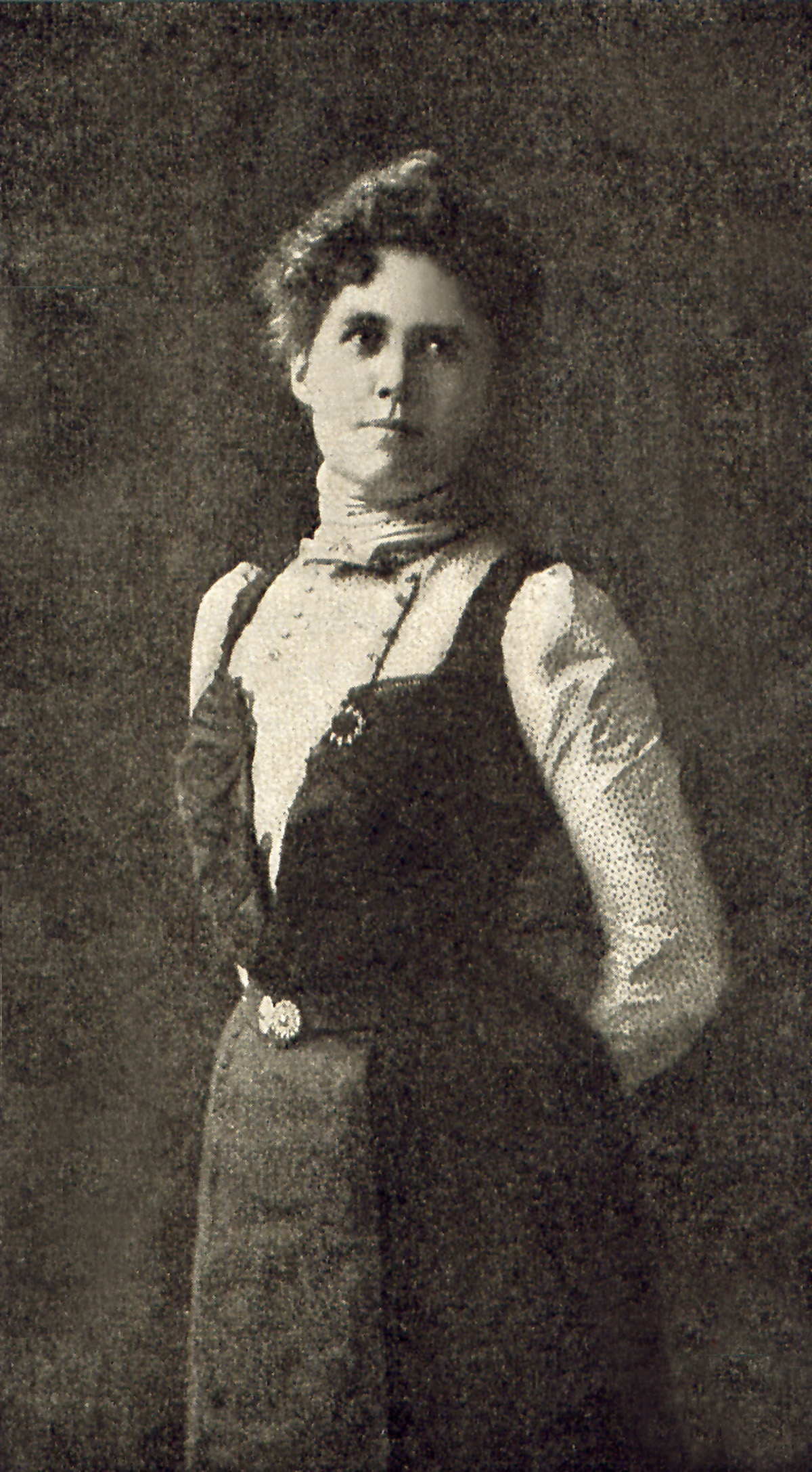
- Candee in 1901
- Born: Helen Churchill Hungerford; October 5, 1858; New York City, U.S.
- Died: August 23, 1949 (aged 90); York Harbor, Maine, U.S.
- Spouse: Edward Willis Candee (m. 1880; div. 1896)

Helen Churchill Candee (October 5, 1858 – August 23, 1949) was an American author, journalist, interior decorator, feminist, and geographer. She is best remembered as a survivor of the sinking of RMS Titanic in 1912, and for her later work as a travel writer and explorer of southeast Asia.

== Early life ==
Helen was born Helen Churchill Hungerford, the daughter of New York City merchant Henry and Mary Elizabeth (Hungerford) Churchill. She spent most of her childhood in Connecticut. She married Edward Candee of Norwalk, Connecticut and had two children by him, Edith and Harold. After her abusive husband abandoned the family, Helen Candee supported herself and children as a writer for popular magazines such as Scribner's and The Ladies' Home Journal. She initially wrote on the subjects most familiar to her—genteel etiquette and household management—but soon branched into other topics such as child care, education, and women's rights. For several years she resided in Oklahoma, and her stories about that region helped to catapult her to national prominence as a journalist. Candee obtained a divorce in 1896, after a lengthy separation.

== Career ==
Candee was a feminist, as evidenced by her best-selling first book, How Women May Earn a Living (1900). Her second book, An Oklahoma Romance (1901), was a novel that promoted the possibilities of settlement in Oklahoma Territory.

An established literary figure, Candee moved to Washington, D.C., where she became one of the first professional interior decorators. Her clients included then Secretary of War Henry Stimson and President Theodore Roosevelt. Candee's book, Decorative Styles and Periods (1906), embodied her principles of design: careful historical research and absolute authenticity.

While in Washington, Candee also pursued an active social life, serving on many civic boards and involving herself in Democratic politics. Yet her friends were a varied lot, from liberal reformer William Jennings Bryan to ultra-conservative First Lady Helen Herron Taft. Her friendship with the Tafts was long-standing, despite their differing opinions on women's rights. She was also close with President Theodore Roosevelt and his wife; two of Candee's most important decorating commissions came from the Roosevelts, the first (in 1907) to select a pair of Louis XVI chairs for the First Lady, the other a general consultancy in partnership with architect Nathan C. Wyeth to remodel the White House's West Wing (in 1909).

Candee was a trustee for the Corcoran Gallery of Art, a member of both the Archeological Society and the American Federation of Arts, and a board member of the Washington chapter of the National Woman Suffrage Association.

In her early years as a journalist, Candee wrote fiction for traditional women's interest magazines like Good Housekeeping, Harper's Bazaar, The Ladies' Home Journal, and Woman's Home Companion. Her later articles, focusing on art, culture, and design, appeared in American Homes, American Magazine of Art, and International Studio. Candee also contributed to many of the leading literary and political journals of the day: Atlantic Monthly, The Century, Forum, Metropolitan, and Scribner's.

She wrote eight books – four were on the decorative arts, two were travelogues, one was instructional, and one was a novel. Candee's biggest seller was The Tapestry Book (1912), which went into many editions.

== Aboard the Titanic ==
Candee was traveling in Europe in the spring of 1912, completing research for The Tapestry Book, when she received a telegram from her daughter, Edith, advising that Candee's son, Harold ("Harry"), had been injured in an accident. From Paris, Candee hurriedly booked passage home on the new luxury ocean liner, the RMS Titanic. On the voyage, she socialized with other prominent travelers, such as President Taft's military aide, Major Archibald Butt, Col. Gracie, and the painter Francis Davis Millet.

Since baggage and personal items were not allowed aboard the lifeboats, Candee gave two precious items, an ivory cameo miniature of her mother and a small flask of brandy, to a male friend, New York architect Edward Austin Kent who had pockets. These were later retrieved from his floating remains and, in 2006, sold at auction for around $80,000 for the locket and $40,000 for the flask. Candee was able to board lifeboat 6 but fell and fractured her ankle in the process. Also aboard was first class passenger Margaret Brown (aka "the unsinkable Molly Brown"); both women rowed the lifeboat.

Candee subsequently gave a short interview about her experiences to the Washington Herald and wrote a detailed article on the disaster for Collier's Weekly. This cover story was one of the first in-depth eyewitness accounts of the sinking published in a major magazine. The article hinted at a romantic involvement with an unidentified male passenger, believed to be an amalgam of two of her escorts en route, New York architect Edward Austin Kent and London investor Hugh Woolner.

Candee's Titanic injury required her to walk with a cane for almost a year, but by March 1913, she was able to join other feminist equestriennes in the "Votes for Women" parade down Pennsylvania Avenue (Washington, D.C.), riding her horse at the head of the procession that culminated at the steps of Capitol Hill.

== First World War, Asian travel, and later life ==
During World War I, Candee worked as a nurse in Rome and Milan under the auspices of the Italian Red Cross, which decorated her for her service. One of her patients in Milan was Ernest Hemingway.

After the war, she traveled to Japan, China, Indonesia, and Cambodia, and her adventures became the basis for two of her most celebrated books: Angkor the Magnificent (1924) and New Journeys in Old Asia (1927). Candee was honored by the French government and the King of Cambodia for these works; she was also commanded to give a reading of Angkor to King George V and Queen Mary at Buckingham Palace.

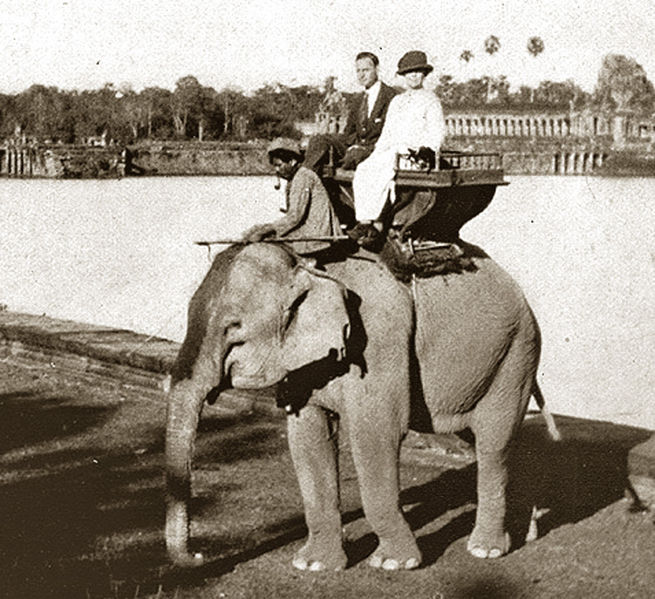
Helen Candee, son Harry, their guide, and "Effie" the elephant at Angkor Wat (1922)

Angkor the Magnificent was the first major English-language study of the ruins of the ancient Khmer temple Angkor Wat and its environs. Called the "Lost City" or the "Wonder City", Angkor Wat is considered one of the great man-made wonders of the world. Largely unknown to Westerners until the publication of Candee's book, its subsequent popularity laid groundwork for the modern tourist market in Cambodia. On Candee's initial southeast Asian trips in 1922-23 she was accompanied by her son, Harry, with whom she trekked through the then dangerous jungles with their native guide, riding atop the great elephant she named "Effie". On later visits, the author was joined by her friend and collaborator, illustrator Lucille Douglass. Although The Tapestry Book was the most lucrative book Candee wrote, Angkor the Magnificent was the most acclaimed.

The success of Angkor and New Journeys led to a prosperous secondary career for Candee as a lecturer on the Far East, while her work as a journalist continued apace. She was briefly Paris editor for Arts & Decoration (1920–21) and remained on that publication's editorial advisory staff for several years.

In 1925, Candee was among the nine founding members of the Society of Woman Geographers. As late as 1935–1936, when she was almost 80, Candee was still traveling abroad, writing articles for National Geographic magazine. Her first books on interior design, The Tapestry Book and Decorative Styles and Periods, were re-released in 1935 and 1938 respectively, the former in a collectible boxed issue.

== Death ==
In 1949, at age 90, Candee died at her summer cottage at York Harbor, Maine.

== Legacy ==
Helen Churchill Candee was a supporting character in novelist Danielle Steel's No Greater Love, based on the sinking of the Titanic.

She was also portrayed in cameo in the 3-D documentary Ghosts of the Abyss (2003), about producer James Cameron's expedition to the wreck of the Titanic. Her part was played by actress Adriana Valdez. The scene in which Candee's character was featured recreated her visit to the bow of the liner on the evening before it sank. This story, based on a possibly romanticized manuscript of Candee's, is believed to have inspired the famous "sunset" love scene between characters Jack and Rose in the earlier motion picture Titanic (1997).

Titanic-related items belonging to Helen Candee, including a flask and a locket she carried with her on board, were auctioned for record sums in 2005–2006. Letters and the manuscript thought to have inspired Cameron were also sold by Candee's family at this time. In 2007, Helen Candee's former Washington home at 1621 New Hampshire Avenue was acquired by The Fund for American Studies. In 2008, her Angkor the Magnificent was re-released in a special edition that includes a new foreword and a biographical profile. In 2009, the newly appointed Ambassador to Cambodia, Carol Rodley, presented a copy of the reissued Angkor as a protocol gift to King Norodom Sihamoni on her arrival at the palace in Phnom Penh, Khmer.
