= Eloise Hughes Smith =

Titanic survivor (1893–1940)

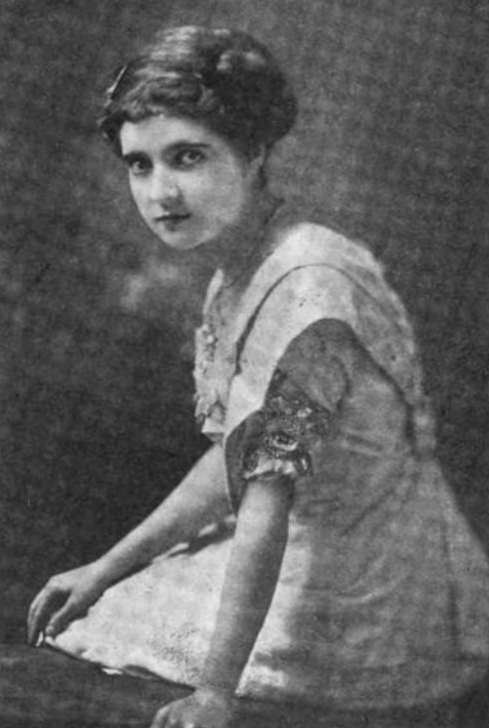
- Hughes, c. 1910
- Born: Mary Eloise Hughes; August 7, 1893; Huntington, West Virginia, U.S.
- Died: May 3, 1940 (aged 46); Cincinnati, Ohio, U.S.
- Resting place: Spring Hill Cemetery, Huntington, West Virginia, U.S.
- Known for: Surviving the sinking of RMS Titanic
- Political party: Republican
- Spouses: Lucian Philip Smith (m. 1912; died 1912) Robert Williams Daniel (m. 1914; div. 1923) Lewis H. Cort, Jr. (m. 1923; died 1927) C.S. Wright (m. 1929, divorced)
- Children: Lucian P. Smith II (1912–1971)
- Father: James A. Hughes

Mary Eloise Hughes (August 7, 1893 – May 3, 1940), better known as Eloise Hughes Smith or Mrs. Lucian P. Smith, was a survivor of the 1912 RMS Titanic disaster. Her first husband, Lucian P. Smith, scion of a wealthy Morgantown family with vast holdings in the Pennsylvania coal fields died in the sinking; she later married a fellow survivor.

== Family and career ==
Smith was a member of the Vinson political family; the daughter of United States Representative James A. Hughes and Belle Vinson.

As children, Smith and her sister had made the acquaintance of President Theodore Roosevelt. She was a popular public speaker. She was active in Republican Party politics and campaigned for women's suffrage. She worked for a time at the pension bureau in Washington D.C.

== Voyage on the Titanic ==
Lucian Philip and Eloise Hughes Smith boarded Titanic on Wednesday evening, 10 April 1912 in Cherbourg on their way home from their honeymoon. The couple had considered taking the Cunard liner RMS Lusitania home but, likely due to Lusitania canceling the remainder of her voyages in April, decided to buy a ticket for the maiden voyage of the newest White Star liner, Titanic.

Their trip had included a transatlantic crossing to Europe aboard Titanic's sister ship RMS Olympic and sightseeing in Italy, France, the Middle East and Egypt. She survived the sinking of the Titanic by escaping on Lifeboat No. 6. She later gave birth to her son Lucian Philip Smith II on 29 November 1912. Two other newly married women on the Titanic later had children as well.

During the sinking, when Smith pleaded whether her husband could go with her, Captain Edward J. Smith ignored her, shouting again through his megaphone the message of women and children first. Lucian told the captain, "Never mind, captain, about that; I will see that she gets in the boat.", before telling his wife, "I never expected to ask you to obey, but this is one time you must. It is only a matter of form to have women and children first. The ship is thoroughly equipped and everyone on her will be saved."

== Life after the Titanic ==
She later married a fellow survivor, Robert Daniel, a bank executive, in 1914. In 1923 Smith divorced Daniel and married Lewis H. Cort, Jr. Cort died several years later, and she married C.S. Wright in 1929. They lived in Charleston, and soon divorced.

== Death ==
Smith died of a heart attack in 1940 at the age of 46 in a sanitarium in Cincinnati. She was buried at the Spring Hill Cemetery.

== Popular culture ==
Smith was quoted extensively in the 1912 best-selling book The Sinking of the Titanic by Jay Henry Mowbray. Her letters and other recollections of the sinking have been quoted in numerous documentaries about the sinking of the ship, including the documentary filmmaker Melissa Jo Peltier in the A&E Network documentaries Titanic: Death of a Dream and Titanic: The Legend Lives On to illustrate the hours between the Titanic's encounter with the iceberg and the rescue of the survivors by RMS Carpathia, and in the documentary Titanic: Anatomy of a Disaster. She was portrayed in the documentary television series Seconds from Disaster by Jennifer Lee Trendowski in the episode featuring the Titanic. She and her husband were portrayed in the 1956 Kraft Television Theatre program A Night to Remember, and were the basis for the characters "Robbie Lucas and Mrs. Liz Lucas", in the 1958 film adaptation portrayed by John Merivale and Honor Blackman. Lucas even says the words actually spoken by Lucian Smith to his wife with some fictional elaboration due to the Lucas couple having three children.
