= Arthur Peuchen =

Canadian businessman (1859–1929)

Lieutenant Colonel Arthur Peuchen
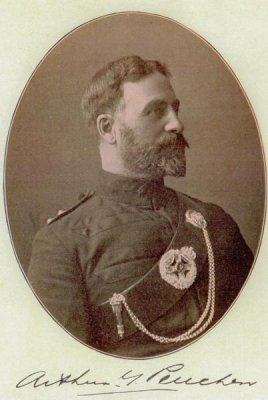
- Born: April 18, 1859; Montreal, Canada East, Province of Canada
- Died: December 7, 1929 (aged 70); Toronto, Ontario, Dominion of Canada
- Resting place: Mount Pleasant Cemetery, Toronto
- Occupation: Businessman
- Spouse: Margaret Thomson (m. 1893)
- Children: 2

Lieutenant Colonel Arthur Godfrey Peuchen (April 18, 1859 – December 7, 1929) was a Canadian businessman and military officer who was on board the RMS Titanic when it sank on its maiden voyage. He is notably the only male passenger allowed onto a lifeboat by Second Officer Charles Lightoller, who had asked someone to volunteer to row because of a shortage of seamen. Peuchen, a yachtsman, volunteered and climbed down a line into Lifeboat No. 6.

== Early life ==
Peuchen was born in Montreal, Canada East in 1859 to Godfrey E. Peuchen, an immigrant from Westphalia, and Eliza E. Clarke, an immigrant from England. His maternal grandfather managed the London, Brighton and South Coast Railway. He was educated in private schools, and moved to Toronto in 1871.

At 17, he joined the militia regiment of The Queen's Own Rifles of Canada, and in 1888 was promoted second lieutenant. He was subsequently promoted captain and then sergeant. Peuchen moved up the ranks, and in 1911 was marshalling officer at the coronation of King George V and Queen Mary.

In 1897, Peuchen perfected plans for extracting useful chemicals from coarse hardwoods and waste woods, the principal products being acetic acid, acetate of lime, acetone, methanol, and formaldehyde. The acids were used by dyeing industries, formaldehyde was used by wheat growers in Canada, and acetone was used to manufacture high explosives like cordite.

Peuchen subsequently became president of Standard Chemical, Iron & Lumber Company of Canada, Ltd. The company had many plants and facilities in Canada, as well as refineries located in Canada (Montreal), France, Germany, and the UK (London). Because some company facilities were located abroad, Peuchen often traveled to Europe by ship.

Peuchen owned a yacht named Vreda which crossed the Atlantic under its own canvas. For a time, he was Vice-Commodore and Rear-Commodore of the Royal Canadian Yacht Club. He also owned a vast, Victorian estate and mansion called "Woodlands," located on Kempenfelt Bay, near Barrie, Ontario just north of Toronto.

== Titanic ==
Peuchen boarded Titanic at Southampton, on April 10, 1912, as a first-class passenger on his 40th transatlantic voyage. He reportedly was concerned that Captain Edward Smith was in command, because of his record with the Olympic.

On the night Titanic sank, Peuchen was near Lifeboat No. 6 as it was being lowered, until Quartermaster Robert Hichens shouted above that the boat had only one seaman. Second Officer Charles Lightoller asked if there were any other seamen available, and when Peuchen saw none were present, he stepped forward to volunteer, telling Lightoller that he was a yachtsman. Captain Smith was standing nearby and suggested Peuchen go down to the Promenade Deck, so he could break a window and climb into Lifeboat No. 6. Lightoller replied, however, that Peuchen could slide down the ropes to enter the boat if he was "sailor enough" to do so. Peuchen then took a rope, swung off the ship, and climbed hand-under-hand down to Lifeboat No. 6. He was the only male passenger that Lightoller would allow into a lifeboat that night. He later claimed he did not realize Titanic was doomed until he viewed the ship from the lifeboat. After he was in the boat, Peuchen realized that during his climb down his wallet had fallen out of his pocket and into the water. He claimed to have left $300,000 in "money, jewelry, and securities" behind in his cabin, stating that "the money seemed to be a mere mockery at that time"; he brought away instead three oranges and a pin that he considered to have brought him good luck.

Because Peuchen was a military officer, he came under scrutiny for allowing Robert Hichens to prevent the boat's occupants from going back for survivors and for tolerating the verbal abuse Hichens reportedly gave.

Peuchen publicly blasted Captain Smith and the crew of Titanic, criticizing their seamanship as substandard; however, his official testimony at the United States Senate inquiry into the disaster was tempered somewhat from interviews he gave in the days after the rescue. He maintained that there were too few experienced sailors and a lack of proper preparation, but noted that the sailors working to fill the lifeboats "could not have been better" and claimed not to have criticized Captain Smith personally, but rather company policy.

In 1987, Peuchen's wallet was recovered from the area around the remains of Titanic; streetcar tickets, a traveler's cheque, and his calling card were found inside.

== Later years ==
In Toronto, some deemed Peuchen a coward given that he was a man who had survived the sinking, but most found his participation in the ill-fated voyage to be largely heroic and courageous. In his memoirs, Lightoller wrote that criticism directed towards Peuchen for following direct orders was unfair. In part due to this debated reputation, speculation gathered that his expected promotion to lieutenant-colonel in The Queen's Own Rifles would not be awarded. Despite the conjecture, he was promoted on May 21, 1912; he also received the Volunteer Officers' Decoration. When World War I began, Peuchen retired from Standard Chemical to command the Home Battalion of the Queen's Own Rifles.

He died in Toronto on December 7, 1929, at age 70. His body was buried in Toronto's Mount Pleasant Cemetery.

== Portrayals ==
- Robert Ayres (1958) - A Night to Remember
- Ralph B. White (1997) - Titanic
- Ralph B. White (2005) - Last Mysteries of the Titanic (Documentary)
- John Yost (2024) - Unsinkable
