= Lookout =

Person on a ship in charge of the observation of the sea for hazards

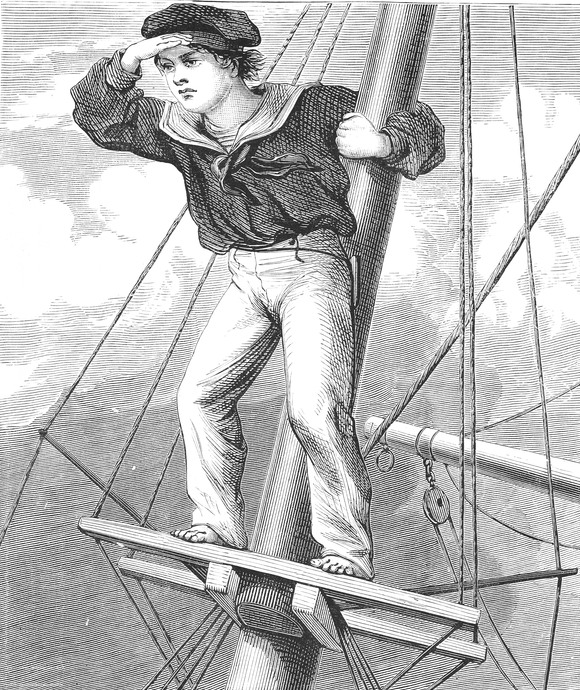
Lookout boy aloft, by Harrison Weir

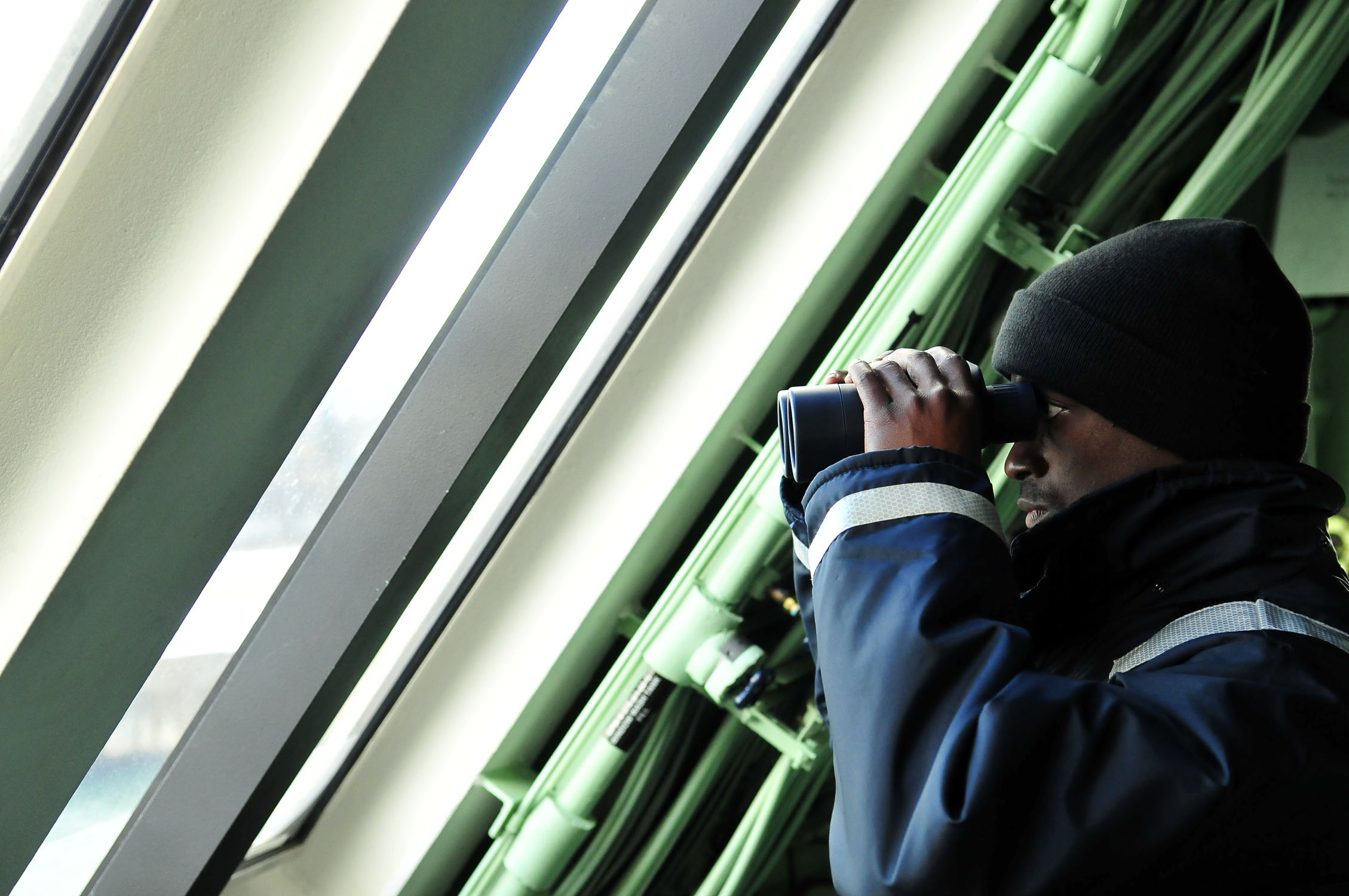
A U.S. Navy sailor standing the lookout watch aboard a warship.

A lookout or look-out is a person in charge of the observation of hazards. The term originally comes from a naval background, where lookouts would watch for other ships, land, and various dangers. The term has now passed into wider parlance.

== Naval application ==
Lookouts have been traditionally placed in high on masts, in crow's nests and tops.

The International Regulations for Preventing Collisions at Sea (1972) says in part:

Every vessel must at all times keep a proper look-out by sight (day shape or lights by eyes or visual aids), hearing (sound signal or Marine VHF radio) and all available means (e.g. Radar, ARPA, AIS, GMDSS...) in order to judge if risk of collision exists.

Lookouts report anything they see and or hear. When reporting contacts, lookouts give information such as, bearing of the object, which way the object is headed, target angles and position angles and what the contact is. Lookouts should be thoroughly familiar with the various types of distress signals they may encounter at sea.

== Criminal definition ==
By analogy, the term "lookout" is also used to describe a person who accompanies criminals during the commission of a crime, and warns them of the impending approach of hazards: that is, police or eyewitnesses. Although lookouts typically do not actually participate in the crime, they can nonetheless be charged with aiding and abetting or with conspiracy, or as accomplices.

== Railway use ==
A lookout may be used when performing engineering works on an operational railway. They will be responsible for ensuring that all staff are cleared of the track in advance of an approaching train.
