= List of last words (20th century) =

List of last words
| 18th century | 19th century | 20th century | 21st century |

The following is a list of last words uttered by notable individuals during the 20th century (1901–2000). A typical entry will report information in the following order:

- Last word(s), name and short description, date of death, circumstances around their death (if applicable), and a reference.

== 1901–1909 ==
"I am not afraid to die."
— Philip Danforth Armour, American industrialist, founder of Armour and Company (6 January 1901)

"Bertie."
— Victoria, queen regnant of the United Kingdom (22 January 1901), calling to her eldest son and heir, Albert, Prince of Wales

"Are the doctors here? Doctor, my lungs..."
— Benjamin Harrison, president of the United States (13 March 1901), dying of pneumonia

"Goodbye. Please dig my grave very deep. All right; hurry up."
— Tom Ketchum, American outlaw and cowboy (26 April 1901), executed by hanging for attempted train robbery

"I have swallowed corrosive sublimate."
— Maltbie Davenport Babcock, American clergyman and writer (18 May 1901), to hospital superintendent and nurse, explaining his method of suicide while suffering from brucellosis

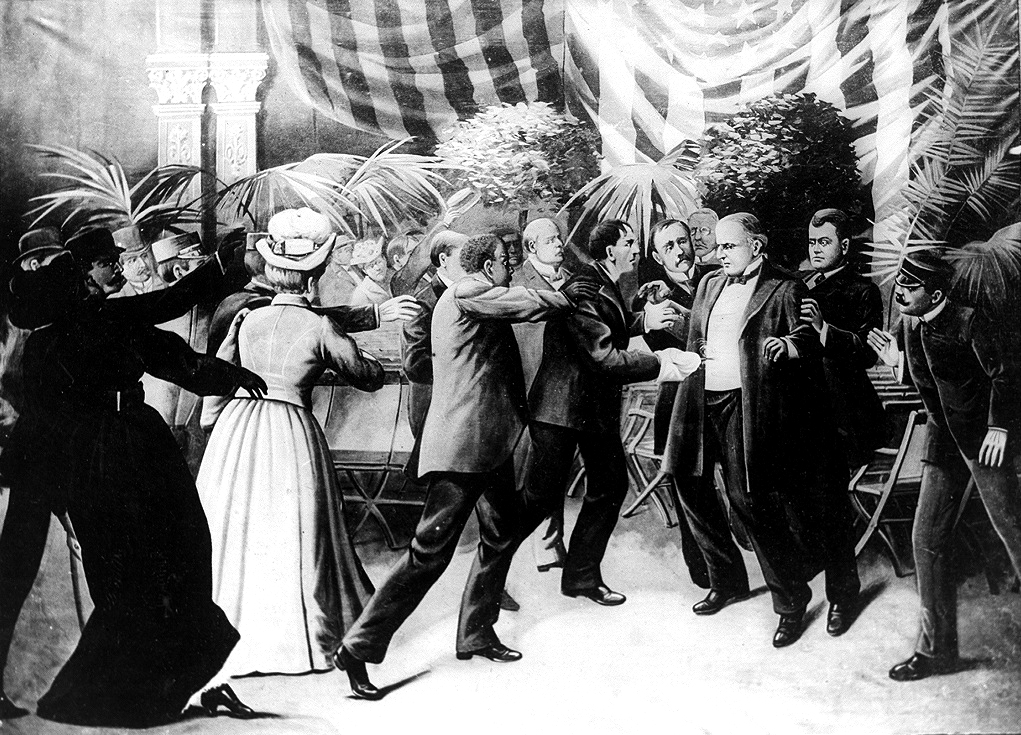
The fatal shooting of President William McKinley in the Temple of Music at the Pan-American Exposition in Buffalo, New York.

"Goodbye, all, goodbye. It is God's way. His will be done." (Note: Also reported as, "We are all going" (when his wife said "I want to go too, I want to go too!"). He may also have sung the first few lines of the hymn "Nearer, My God, to Thee".)
— William McKinley, president of the United States (14 September 1901), dying after being shot on 6 September

"My last words to you, my son and successor, are: Never trust the Russians."
— Abdur Rahman Khan, Emir of Afghanistan (1 October 1901), to Habibullah Khan

"Come right out this way."
— William Thomas Maxwell, American tracker and deputized sheriff (8 October 1901), telling the Smith Gang to surrender prior to the Battleground Gunfight

"Give this to my wife. It, and the month's wages coming to me, will be all she will ever have."
— Carlos Tafolla, Arizona Ranger (8 October 1901), handing a silver dollar to posse member Henry Barrett after being mortally wounded in Battleground Gunfight

"I killed the President because he was the enemy of the good people—the good working people. I am not sorry for my crime. I am sorry I could not see my father."
— Leon Czolgosz, assassin of U.S. President William McKinley (29 October 1901), prior to execution by electrocution

"I've been looking forward to this."
— Edgar Edwards, convicted murderer (1902), on the way to the scaffold

"Shoot straight, you bastards. Don't make a mess of it!"
— Breaker Morant, Anglo-Australian military officer and war criminal (27 February 1902), to his firing squad

"The position has become impossible.
Anxious important work to do and three commissions of enquiry to attend to.
We may not have done as well as possible in the past but we will necessarily be hampered to do well in the imminent future.
I feel that my brain is suffering and I am in great fear of what effect all this worry will have upon me. I have lost control of my thoughts.
The Coolgardie scheme is all right and I could finish it if I got a chance and protection from misrepresentation but there's no hope for that now and its better that it should be given to some entirely new man to do who will be untrammelled by prior responsibility.
10/3/02
Put the wing walls to Helena Weir at once"
— C. Y. O'Connor, engineer-in-chief of Western Australia (10 March 1902), purported suicide note

"How do you do, Cushing? I am glad to see you."
— John Peter Altgeld, 20th Governor of Illinois (12 March 1902), greeting a visitor

"So little done, so much to do."
— Cecil Rhodes, British businessman and politician (26 March 1902)

"Have you brought the chequebook, Alfred?"
— Samuel Butler, English novelist (18 June 1902)

"I feel sick. The dog is sick, too. We are both ill. It must be something we have eaten."
— Émile Zola, French novelist, playwright and journalist (29 September 1902), dying of carbon monoxide poisoning from an improperly ventilated chimney

"And now I am officially dead."
— Abram Hewitt, United States Congressman and Mayor of New York City (18 January 1903), removing his oxygen mask

"I don't know you, I tell you, and you must go away from here."
— Andrew Haswell Green, American lawyer, city planner and civic leader (13 November 1903), to his murderer, Cornelius Williams

"I feel a bit dizzy, I think I'll go and lie down."
("Mně se nějak točí hlava, půjdu si raději lehnout.")
— Antonín Dvořák, Czech composer (1 May 1904)

"It's a long time since I drank champagne."
("Давно я не пил шампанского...")
— Anton Chekhov, Russian author and playwright (15 July [O.S. 2 July] 1904), to his wife, Olga

"Thy will be done."
— Lew Wallace, American lawyer, politician, Union general and author (15 February 1905)

"That was the right prayer."
— Jay Cooke, American financier (16 February 1905), having overheard a prayer for the dead

"Our trade falls heavily upon these feeble folk."
— Maurice Barrymore, British stage actor (25 March 1905), quoting his play Nadjezda

"Syrie, my head is so heavy. Let me rest it on your face." (Note: Also reported as, "Oh, Syrie! My head feels so heavy!")
— Thomas John Barnardo, Irish-born British philanthropist, founder of the Barnardo's charity (19 September 1905), to his wife

"Make them."
— Susan B. Anthony, American social reformer and women's rights activist (13 March 1906), to her chosen successor, who was worried that she would not be allowed to succeed Anthony

"On the contrary!"
("Tvertimod!")
— Henrik Ibsen, Norwegian playwright (23 May 1906), to his maid, who had said his health was improving

"Doctor, you have science, I have faith."
— Dmitri Mendeleev, Russian chemist (2 February [O.S. 20 January] 1907)

"In spite of it all, I am going to sleep; put out the lights."
— Thomas Bailey Aldrich, American author and editor (19 March 1907)

"I'm not guilty of the charge."
— Alferd Packer, American prospector and wilderness guide (23 April 1907), who had served 18 years in prison for killing and eating five of his traveling companions in 1874

"Long live the Korean Empire!"
(대한제국 만세!)
— Park Seung-hwan, Imperial Korean officer (1 August 1907), before committing suicide with his pistol

"Well, if it must be so."
— Edvard Grieg, Norwegian composer and pianist (4 September 1907)

"I perished in latitude 79° north under the hardships of the return journey over the inland ice in November. I reached this place under a waning moon, and cannot go on, because of my frozen feet and the darkness. The bodies of the others are in the middle of the fjord. Hagen died on November 15, Mylius Erichsen some ten days later.–Jørgen Brønlund."
("Omkom 79 Fjorden efter Forsøg hjemrejse over Indlandsisen, i November Maaned jeg kommer hertil i aftagende Maaneskin og kunde ikke videre af Forfrosninger i Fødderne og af Mørket. Andres Lig findes midt i Fjorden foran Bræ (omkring 2½ Mil). Hagen døde 15 November og Mylius omtrent 10 dage efter".)
— Jørgen Brønlund, Greenlandic polar explorer (November 1907), final diary entry

"I am dying. Please... bring me a toothpick."
— Alfred Jarry, French symbolist writer (1 November 1907)

"What Papa couldn't do, Wanda will have to finish."
— Anton Gag, Sudeten-American painter and studio photographer (22 May 1908), to his daughter Wanda

"I have tried so hard to do right."
— Grover Cleveland, president of the United States (24 June 1908), to his wife Frances

"I am about the extent of a tenth of a gnat's eyebrow better."
— Joel Chandler Harris, American author and folklorist (3 July 1908), on being asked how he felt

"Never again allow a woman to hold the supreme power in the State... [and] be careful not to allow eunuchs to meddle in government affairs."
— Empress Dowager Cixi, de facto ruler of China (15 November 1908)

"Watch me do a trick."
— Reddy Foster, American baseball player (19 December 1908), said to his friend before committing suicide with a shotgun

"By gad, I'm not licked yet."
— Lucky Baldwin, California businessman (1 March 1909), repeating his lifelong catchphrase

"It is no use fighting death any more."
— John Millington Synge, Irish author (24 March 1909)

"Dreadful! Dreadful!"
— Frederick Holder, Speaker of the Australian House of Representatives (23 July 1909), prior to collapsing in the House after a tumultuous all-night session

"I'm guilty. I murdered that man."
– Poral Stefoff, Macedonian murderer (23 December 1909), moments prior to his execution for the robbery-murder of his second cousin in Toronto

"Cut 'er loose, Doc!"
— Frederic Remington, American artist (26 December 1909), prior to emergency appendectomy; he subsequently died of peritonitis.

== 1910–1919 ==
"When the day comes that I hear of Korea's independence in heaven, I will dance and shout 'Hurrah!'"
— An Jung-geun, Korean independence fighter and assassin of Ito Hirobumi (26 March 1910), before being executed

"Give me my glasses."
— Mark Twain, American novelist (21 April 1910), to his daughter Clara

"Yes, I have heard of it. I am very glad."
— Edward VII, king of the United Kingdom (6 May 1910), on being told by his son that one of his horses had won a race

"Pull up the shades; I don't want to go home in the dark." (Note: Also reported as, "Don't turn down the light. I'm afraid to go home in the dark" or "Turn up the lights. I don't want to go home in the dark.")
— O. Henry, American writer (5 June 1910), to a hospital nurse

"These then are my last words to you. Be not afraid of life. Believe that life is worth living and your belief will help create the fact."
— William James, American philosopher and psychologist (26 August 1910)

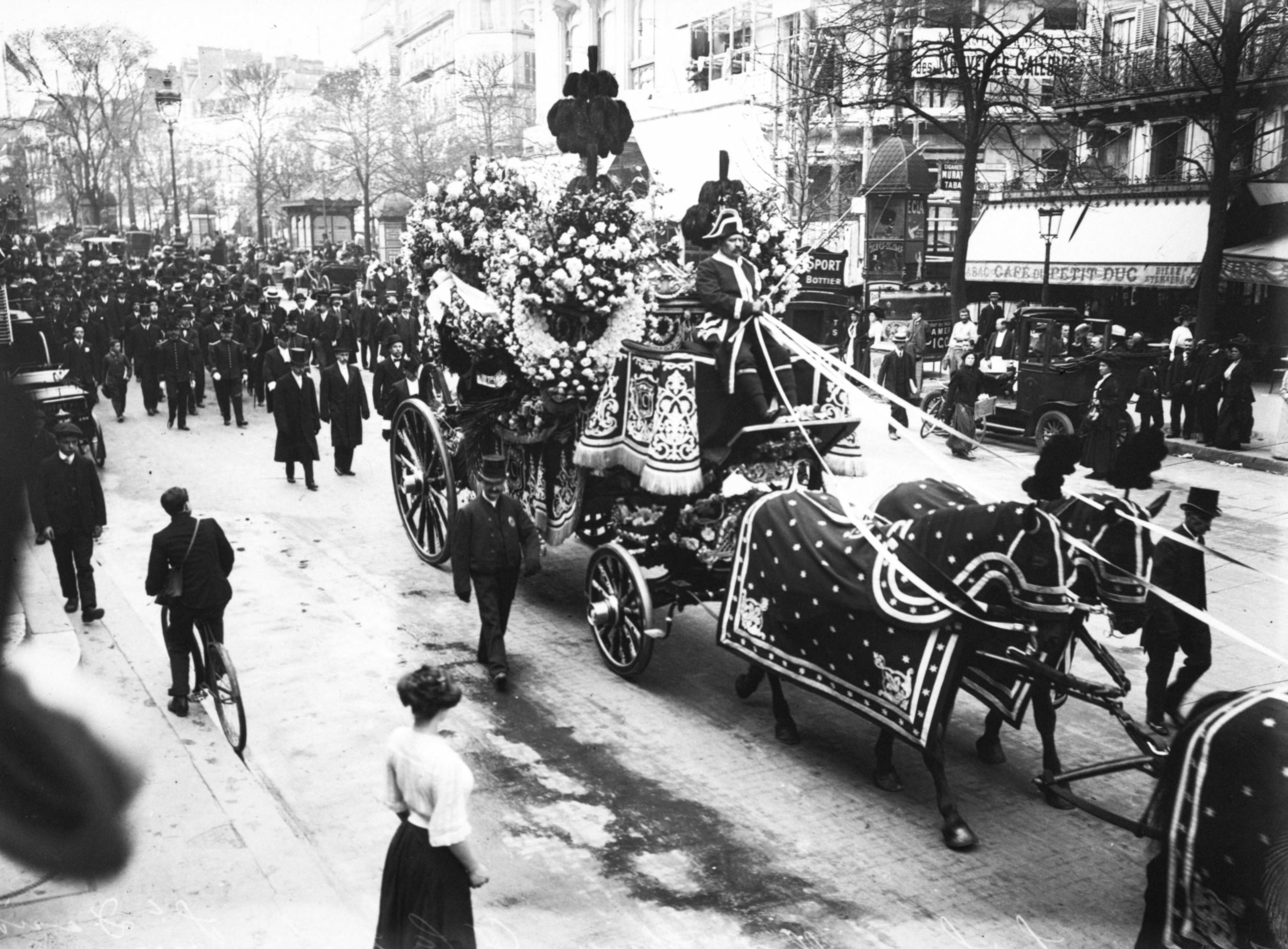
The funeral of Jorge Chávez in Paris.

"Higher. Always higher."
("Arriba. Siempre arriba.")
— Jorge Chávez, Peruvian aviator (27 September 1910), after being fatally injured in airplane crash

"To die this way is stupid... And it would please so many scoundrels!... This very night, Magalhães, I could have died for the Republic!"
("Morrer assim é estúpido... E há tanto malandro que ia ficar radiante!... Esta noite, Magalhães, podia eu morrer pela República!")
— Miguel Bombarda, Portuguese psychiatrist (3 October 1910), after being shot by a mental patient

"I'm so tired. Take me home to mother."
— Stanley Ketchel, American professional boxer nicknamed "The Michigan Assassin" (15 October 1910), before succumbing to wounds sustained during an armed robbery turned shooting.

"God will help me. I am so tired."
— Julia Ward Howe, American poet and author (17 October 1910)

"But the peasants...how do the peasants die?" (Note: Also reported as, "Even in the valley of the shadow of death, two and two do not make six" (refusing to reconcile with the Russian Orthodox Church), "I do not understand what I have to do" and as "The truth... I care a great deal... how they..." Tolstoy's first name is incorrectly given by Ward as "Nikolai".)
— Leo Tolstoy, Russian novelist (20 November [O.S. 7 November] 1910), to a station master in whose home he died

"God is my life."
— Mary Baker Eddy, founder of Christian Science (3 December 1910)

"Mozart! Mozart!"
— Gustav Mahler, Austrian composer and conductor (18 May 1911)

"Put your hands on my shoulders and don't struggle."
— W. S. Gilbert, English dramatist and librettist (29 May 1911), while saving 17-year-old Ruby Preece from drowning, which caused his fatal heart attack

"Long live Shah Muhammad Ali!"
("Zindabad Muhammad Ali Shah!")
— Arshadu'd-Dawla (6 September 1911), while being executed by firing squad for involvement in a plot to restore Mohammad Ali Shah Qajar to the Persian throne

"Here I go. Here I go. Here I go."
— Cromwell Dixon, American aviator (2 October 1911), as his biplane crashed sideways

"One last drink, please."
— Jack Daniel, American alcohol businessman (10 October 1911)

"Should I lift my head a bit?"
— Dmitry Bogrov, assassin of Russian Prime Minister Pyotr Stolypin (24 September 1911), to his executioner prior to hanging

"See you soon."
("À bientôt.")
— Franz Reichelt, Austro-Hungarian born French tailor and inventor (4 February 1912), prior to leaping from Eiffel Tower in fatal test of "parachute suit"

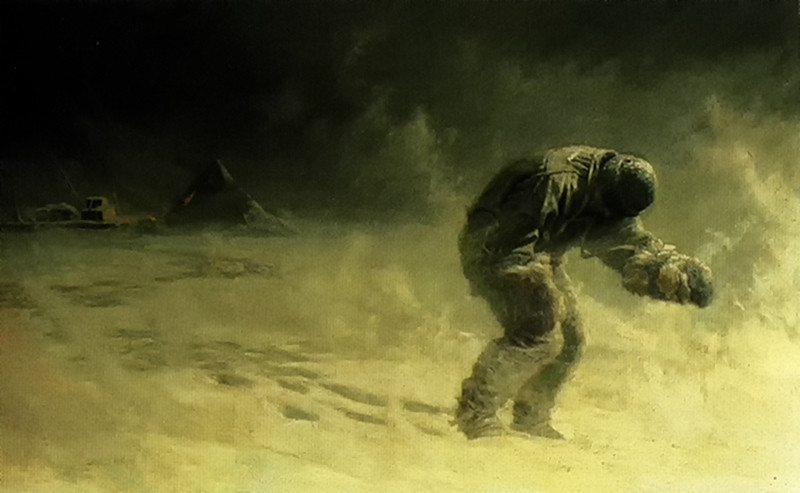
Painting of Lawrence Oates leaving the tent by John Charles Dollman.

"I am just going outside and may be some time."
— Lawrence Oates, British army officer and Antarctic explorer (17 March 1912), prior to walking out of tent and into blizzard on Terra Nova Expedition

"Last Entry — For God's sake look after our people"
— Robert Falcon Scott, Royal Navy officer and Antarctic explorer (c. 29 March 1912); final diary entry on doomed Terra Nova Expedition

"Let me go! Let me go!"
— Clara Barton, American nurse and founder of the American Red Cross (12 April 1912)

Sinking of the Titanic

- "Go ahead, we will get into one of the other boats."

— Carl Oscar Vilhelm Gustafsson Asplund, Swedish-American farmer (15 April 1912), to his wife, Selma Johansson Asplund, asking her to board a lifeboat with two of their children during the sinking of the Titanic. Carl Asplund and three of his sons perished. His daughter Lillian Asplund was the last living American survivor of the disaster, dying in 2006.

- "The ladies have to go first.... Get into the lifeboat, to please me.... Goodbye, dearie. I'll see you later."

— John Jacob Astor IV, American businessman (15 April 1912), remaining aboard the Titanic while his pregnant wife boarded a lifeboat

- "Well boys, do your best for the women and children, and look out for yourselves." (Note: Several accounts suggest that Captain Smith jumped overboard as the ship sank and subsequently perished in the water, possibly near Collapsible B. An unknown swimmer who was thought to have been Smith, cried out, "All right boys. Good luck and God bless you", and cheered the occupants on saying "Good boys! Good lads!" before dying.)

— Edward Smith, sea captain of the RMS Titanic (15 April 1912), giving orders to crew members before the final plunge of the sinking ship

"When a man has a great name, he must expect to die for it."
— Rukara, one of the leaders of Ndungutse's rebellion (18 April 1912), after hearing his death sentence

"Everything is atoned for."
— August Strindberg, Swedish author (14 May 1912)

"And the homeless children, Bramwell, look after the homeless. Promise me..."
— William Booth, English Methodist preacher and co-founder of the Salvation Army (20 August 1912), to his son, Bramwell Booth

"I expected many honors from this war, but not the added honor that I offer my life for my Greece."
— Lorentzos Mavilis, Greek poet (29 November 1912), killed in action at the Battle of Driskos

"Remember, keep the right wing strong."
— Alfred von Schlieffen, German field marshal and strategist (4 January 1913)

"Swing low, sweet chariot."
— Harriet Tubman, American humanitarian and activist (10 March 1913)

"Tomorrow, when I pay my formal visit to the dreadnought Goeben, it is the fact that a German battleship is to honor a Greek King here in Salonika that will fill me with happiness and contentment." (Note: Also reported as, "Thank God, Christmas can now finish his work with a chapter to the glory of Greece, of the Crown Prince and of the Army." (referring to his biographer).)
— George I, king of Greece (18 March 1913), shortly before being assassinated

"Don't baby me so!"
— J. P. Morgan, American financier and banker (31 March 1913)

"Goodbye, gentlemen, I am going now."
— Charles Deen, Sri Lankan murderer (5 May 1913), prior to execution by hanging at Boggo Road Gaol in Brisbane, Australia

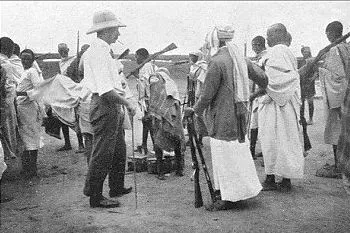
Corfield distributing arms prior to battle

"Leave me!"
("Bes! Bes! Bes!")
— Richard Corfield, British colonial police officer (9 August 1913), killed in action at the Battle of Dul Madoba

"To be a gringo in Mexico – ah, that is euthanasia!"
— Ambrose Bierce, American writer and journalist (c. 1914), written before his disappearance in Mexico

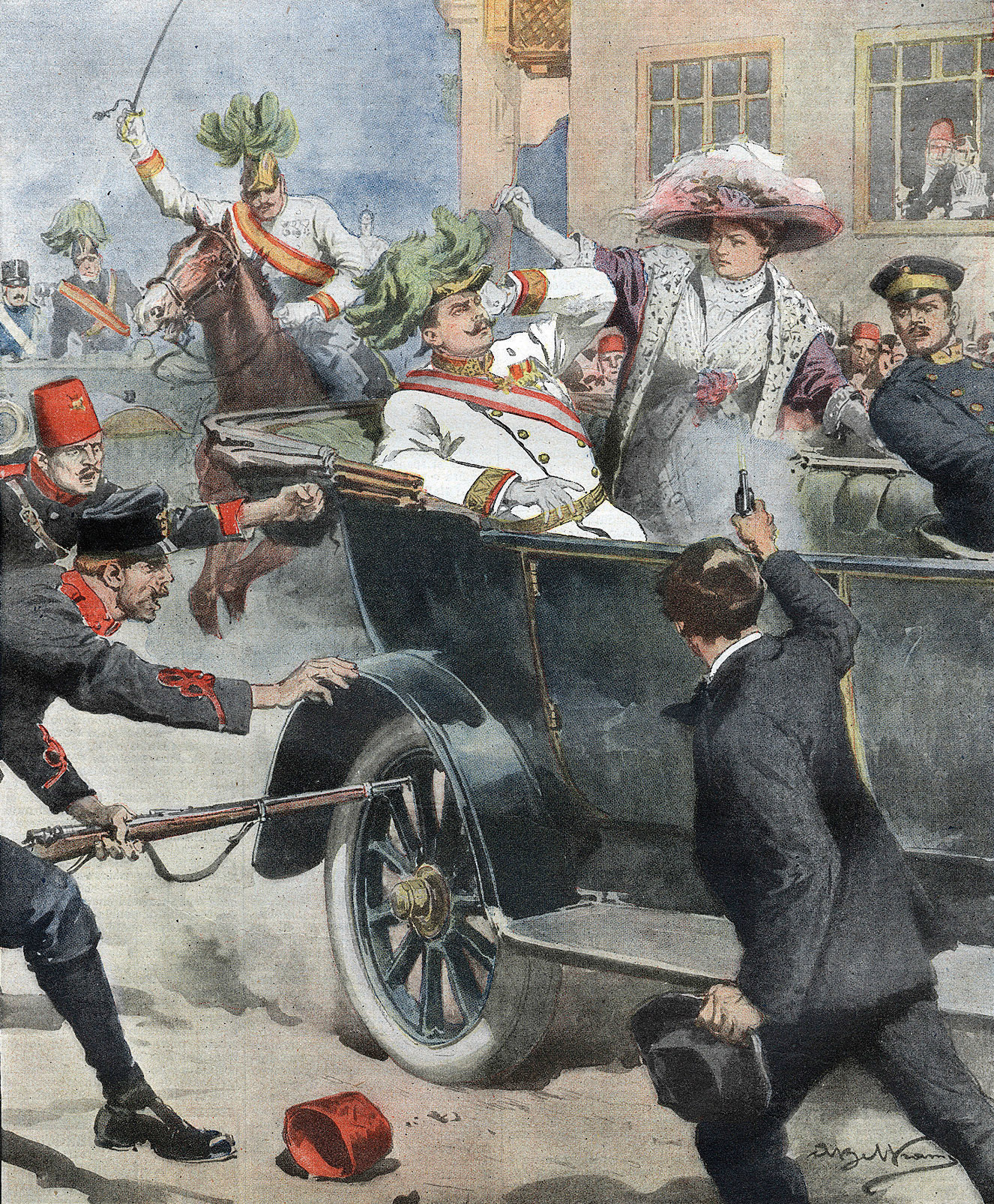
Archduke Franz Ferdinand of Austria and his wife were assassinated during a motorcade ride through Sarajevo by a group of nationalists. This was the first event in a series that triggered World War I.

"It is nothing... it is nothing..."
("Es ist gar nichts... es ist gar nichts...")
— Archduke Franz Ferdinand of Austria, heir to the throne of Austria-Hungary (28 June 1914), on his way to a hospital after being fatally shot by a Serbian nationalist

"Now I begin to think the end is approaching. The Almighty in His inexhaustible goodness wishes to spare me the horrors which Europe is undergoing."
— Pope Pius X, Italian Roman Catholic prelate and Pope (20 August 1914)

"Arthur, don't look at me! Nurse stand between my brother and me.... Jesus, Mary and Joseph, I give you my heart and my soul."
— Robert Hugh Benson AFSC KC*SG KGCHS, English Roman Catholic priest and author (19 October 1914)

"I know I must go, but I'm satisfied, for we beat Peggy Parratt."
— Harry Turner, Canton Professionals center (15 November 1914), to Canton manager Jack Cusack, after suffering fractured back and severed spinal cord while tackling the Akron Indians' Joe Collins

"By Jove, that has deafened my right ear."
— Frederick Harding Turner, Scottish sportsman (10 January 1915), shortly before being killed by a sniper during World War I

"Hullo."
— Rupert Brooke, English poet (23 April 1915), to William Denis Browne, who visited him on his deathbed

"Why fear death? Death is only a beautiful adventure."
— Charles Frohman, American theater manager and producer (7 May 1915), paraphrasing Peter Pan prior to dying in the sinking of the RMS Lusitania

"Well, they [German Empire] have got us. They are a damn sight worse than I ever thought they were."
— Elbert Hubbard, American writer and publisher (7 May 1915), prior to dying with his wife in the sinking of the RMS Lusitania

"There does not seem to be anything to do."
— Alice Moore Hubbard, American feminist and writer (7 May 1915), on her husband being asked "What are you going to do?" prior to the sinking of the RMS Lusitania

"Tell them I died happy, loving them all."
— Francis Octavius Grenfell VC, British Army officer (24 May 1915), mortally wounded during World War I, referring to his squadron

"Oh, Lord, I proclaim to the world that I am innocent of this crime."
— Charles Becker, American police officer (30 July 1915), prior to execution by electrocution for murder

"We shall meet again." (Note: Cavell's final words to the German Lutheran prison chaplain, Paul Le Seur, were recorded as, "Ask Father Gahan to tell my loved ones later on that my soul, as I believe, is safe and that I am glad to die for my country.")
— Edith Cavell, British nurse (12 October 1915), executed by firing squad in German-occupied Belgium for having helped Allied soldiers escape to the then-neutral Netherlands during World War I. She said this on the night before her execution to Reverend H. Stirling Gahan, the Anglican chaplain who had been allowed to see her and to give her Holy Communion.

"I led them to the end, they wavered I tried to keep them together."
— Ralph Hemingway, English cricketer (15 October 1915), fatally wounded during World War I

"Fire – go on and fire!" (Note: Just prior to his execution, Hill had written to Bill Haywood, an IWW leader, saying, "Goodbye Bill. I die like a true blue rebel. Don't waste any time in mourning. Organize... Could you arrange to have my body hauled to the state line to be buried? I don't want to be found dead in Utah.")
— Joe Hill, Swedish-American labor activist (19 November 1915). Hill shouted these words after Deputy Shettler, who led his firing squad, called out the sequence of commands preparatory to firing ("Ready, aim").

"So here it is at last, the distinguished thing."
— Henry James, American-British author (28 February 1916)

"Goodbye, God bless you all."
— William Richard Cotter VC, British Army soldier (14 March 1916), mortally wounded during World War I

(Whistling)
— Patrick Pearse, Irish author and revolutionary (3 May 1916), on his way to execution by firing squad

"I'm going to have a shot at getting him in."
— Cyril Rattigan, English cricketer (13 November 1916), prior to fatally attempting to kill a German sniper during World War I

"Put that bloody cigarette out!"
— Saki (Hector Hugh Munro), British writer (14 November 1916), prior to being killed by a German sniper during the Battle of the Ancre in World War I

"How beautiful it all is."
— Frederick Funston, United States Army general and Medal of Honor recipient (19 February 1917), while listening to an orchestra play "The Blue Danube" waltz in the lobby of The St. Anthony Hotel in San Antonio, Texas. He then collapsed from a heart attack.

"I have perfect faith."
— Ferdinand von Zeppelin, German general and airship inventor (8 March 1917)

"I don't think so, I don't think so."
— Albert Ball, VC, DSO & Two Bars, MC, British World War I fighter ace (7 May 1917), said to a member of his ground crew before dying in a flying accident

"Do not forget what I have told you."
— Noel Godfrey Chavasse, VC & Bar, MC, British Army officer (4 August 1917), mortally wounded at the Battle of Passchendaele in World War I. He was reminding a nurse of their earlier conversation about contacting his father and fiancée and about his younger brother, who was missing in action.

"Tom, I'm done. Throw me overboard."
— Thomas Crisp VC, DSC, Royal Naval Reserve, skipper of armed trawler Nelson (15 August 1917), to his son after being mortally wounded in a German submarine attack during World War I

"It is unbelievable." (Note: Also reported as, "Death is nothing, nor life either, for that matter. To die, to sleep, to pass into nothingness, what does it matter? Everything is an illusion.")
— Mata Hari, Dutch exotic dancer and courtesan (15 October 1917), prior to execution by French firing squad for spying for Germany during World War I

"Hold up the train. Ammunition ship afire in harbour making for Pier 6 and will explode. Guess this will be my last message. Goodbye, boys."
— Vince Coleman, Canadian train dispatcher (6 December 1917), warning an incoming train by telegraph of the impending Halifax Explosion

"We are in the hands of God."
— Geoffrey Saxton White VC, Royal Navy officer (28 January 1918), before being killed by a shell on the deck of HMS E14 in the Dardanelles during World War I

"Throw up your hands! Throw up your hands!"
— Thomas Kane Wooten, Graham County, Arizona Deputy Sheriff (10 February 1918), prior to death in the Power's Cabin shootout

"Never."
— Wilfrith Elstob VC, DSO, MC, British Army officer (21 March 1918), in response to enemy demand to surrender on the first day of the German spring offensive during World War I

"Save yourselves. I'll carry on."
— Herbert George Columbine VC, British Army soldier (22 March 1918), to fellow soldiers after holding off the enemy for four hours with a Vickers machine gun at Hervilly Wood, France, during World War I

"Carry on with those on the left."
— William Herbert Anderson VC, British Army officer (25 March 1918), to a fellow officer during World War I counter-attack at Bois Favieres, near Maricourt, Somme, France

"Dear child, keep me alive." (Note: Also reported as, "Goodnight, my dear" (to his housekeeper).)
— Henry Adams, American historian and descendant of two U.S. Presidents (27 March 1918), to his secretary companion the day before he died

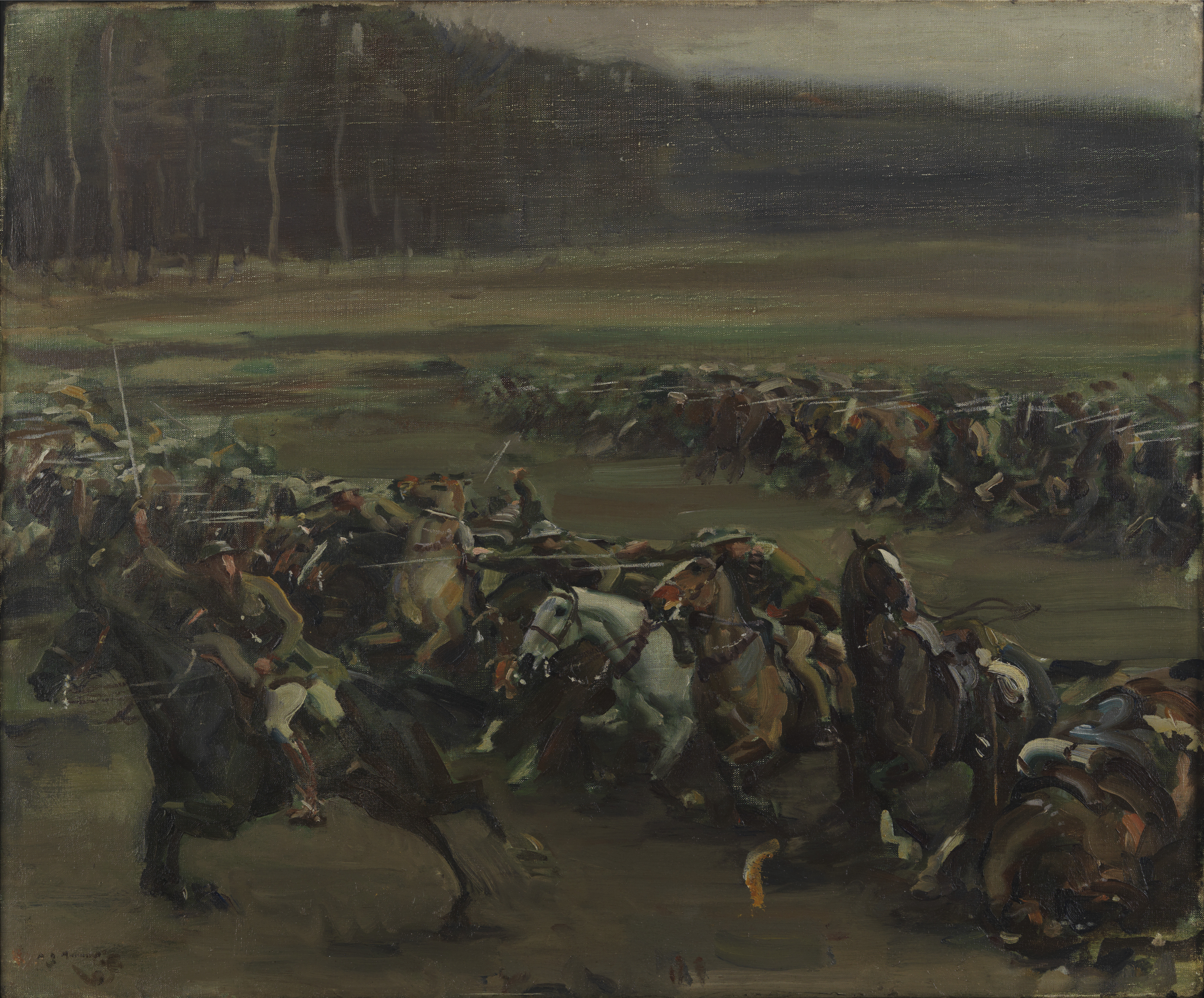
Charge of Flowerdew's Squadron, 1918 by Alfred Munnings, Canadian War Museum

"Carry on boys. We have won."
— Gordon Flowerdew VC, Canadian Expeditionary Force officer (31 March 1918), mortally wounded at the Battle of Moreuil Wood in World War I

"Kaputt."
- Manfred von Richthofen, or the Red Baron (April 21, 1918), mortally wounded at the Fourth Battle of Ypres.

"But we coped with the sadness, and we wait for death from one moment to the next."
— Mohammad Jawad al Jaza'iri, Iraqi cleric, one of the ringleaders of the anti-British uprising in Najaf (May 1918); final lines of poem written prior to his execution

"Don't bother with me. Take care of my good men."
— Major Lloyd W. Williams, United States Marine Corps officer (12 June 1918), to his approaching medics, after being gassed and hit by German shrapnel during the Battle of Belleau Wood in World War I

"You know not what you do." (Note: Also reported as, "What?")
— Nicholas II of Russia, last Emperor of Russia (17 July 1918), quoting Jesus to Yakov Yurovsky upon being informed he and his family were to be put to death.

"I am through. Take charge of the company. I won't be here long."
— Jean Brillant VC, Canadian Expeditionary Force officer (10 August 1918), fatally wounded by enemy machine-gun fire during World War I

"Stick it, men; show them fight, and for God's sake put up a good fight."
— Richard Annesley West, VC, DSO & Bar, MC, British Army officer (2 September 1918), killed in action during World War I

"I am sorry to have been so much trouble; I shall never forget what you have done for me."
— Oswald Samson, English cricketer (17 September 1918), fatally wounded during World War I

"I'm all finished. Give them hell."
— Milo Lemert, United States Army soldier and recipient of the Medal of Honor (29 September 1918), mortally wounded near Bellicourt, France, during World War I

"Here lies one whose name was written in hot water."
— Robbie Ross, Canadian-British journalist, art critic and art dealer (5 October 1918), referring to the inscription on John Keats' grave ("Here lies One Whose Name was writ in Water").

"It's all right Cowling; we've got them stone cold."
— Jack Youll VC, British Army officer (27 October 1918), prior to being killed in action at the Battle of Vittorio Veneto during World War I

"Well done. You are doing that very well, my boy."
— Wilfred Owen, English soldier and poet (4 November 1918), to a soldier under his command before being killed in action during the crossing of the Sambre–Oise Canal in World War I

"Go away gnadiger Frau [gracious lady]."
— Julian Royds Gribble VC, British Army officer (25 November 1918), dismissing his nurse while dying of pneumonia at Niederzwehren prisoner of war camp

"I die well! Save the Fatherland!"
("Morro bem! Salvem a Pátria!")
— Sidónio Pais, Portuguese politician, military officer, and diplomat (14 December 1918), according to reporter Reinaldo Ferreira.

"Please put out that light, James."
— Theodore Roosevelt, president of the United States and Medal of Honor recipient (6 January 1919), to family servant James E. Amos

"Goodbye, until Heaven!"
("Adeus, até ao Céu!")
— Saint Francisco Marto, Portuguese Marian mysticist (4 April 1919), to his cousin Lúcia

"I must get back to my work."
— Jane Delano, American nurse, founder of the American Red Cross Nursing Service (15 April 1919), dying while on a Red Cross mission in France

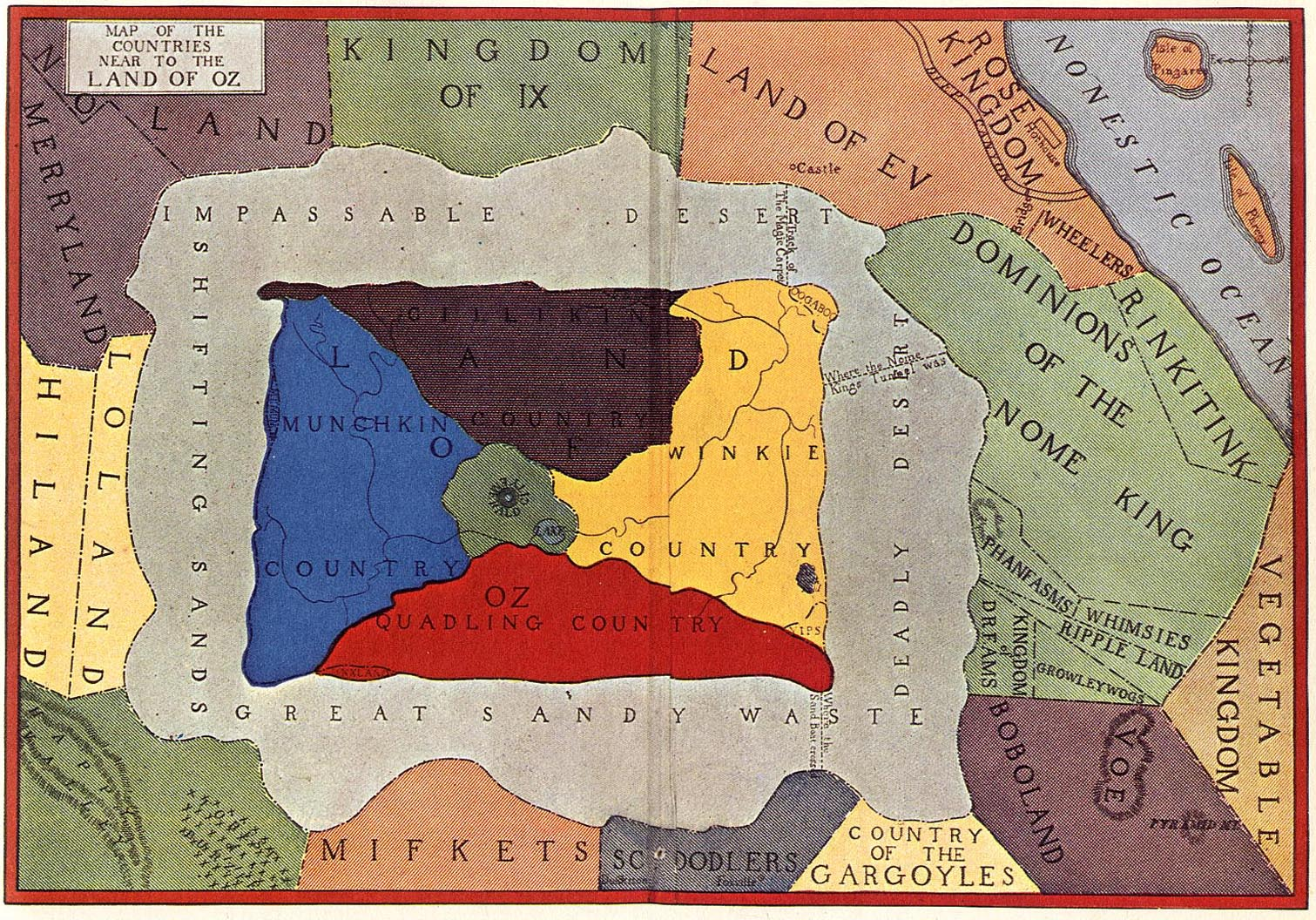
Map of Oz and its surrounding countries, showing the location of the Shifting Sands.

"Now we can cross the Shifting Sands together."
— L. Frank Baum, American author (5 May 1919), referring to a fictional location in his Oz books

== 1920–1929 ==
"Let my soldiers know that I've always been committed to them, loved them and proved it by my death."
(Пусть войска знают, что я им предан был, что я любил их и своею смертью среди них доказал это.)
— Vladimir Kappel, White Russian military leader (26 January 1920), dying during the Great Siberian Ice March

"Never mind, it is good to die for our country."
("אין דבר, טוב למות בעד ארצנו")
— Joseph Trumpeldor, Jewish Zionist activist (1 March 1920), during the Battle of Tel Hai

"I'm all right; tell Mays not to worry... ring....Katie's ring."
— Ray Chapman, American baseball player (17 August 1920), referring to the pitcher who had fatally struck him with a pitch and to his wedding band

"Even if my fingernails are torn out, my nose and ears are ripped apart, and my legs and arms are crushed, this physical pain does not compare to the pain of losing my nation. My only remorse is not being able to do more than dedicating my life to my country."
("내 손톱이 빠져 나가고 내 귀와 코가 잘리고 내 손과 다리가 부러져도 그 고통은 이길 수 있사오나 나라를 잃어버린 그 고통만은 견딜 수가 없습니다. 나라에 바칠 목숨이 오직 하나밖에 없는 것만이 이 소녀의 유일한 슬픔입니다.")
— Ryu Gwansun, Korean independence activist (20 September 1920), writing in prison before being tortured and beaten to death by Japanese prison officers

"Some day, when things look real tough for Notre Dame [Notre Dame Fighting Irish football], ask the boys to go out there and win one for the Gipper." (Note: The story of Gipp's last words was possibly fabricated by Rockne.)
— George Gipp, American college football player (14 December 1920), to Knute Rockne while dying of pneumonia

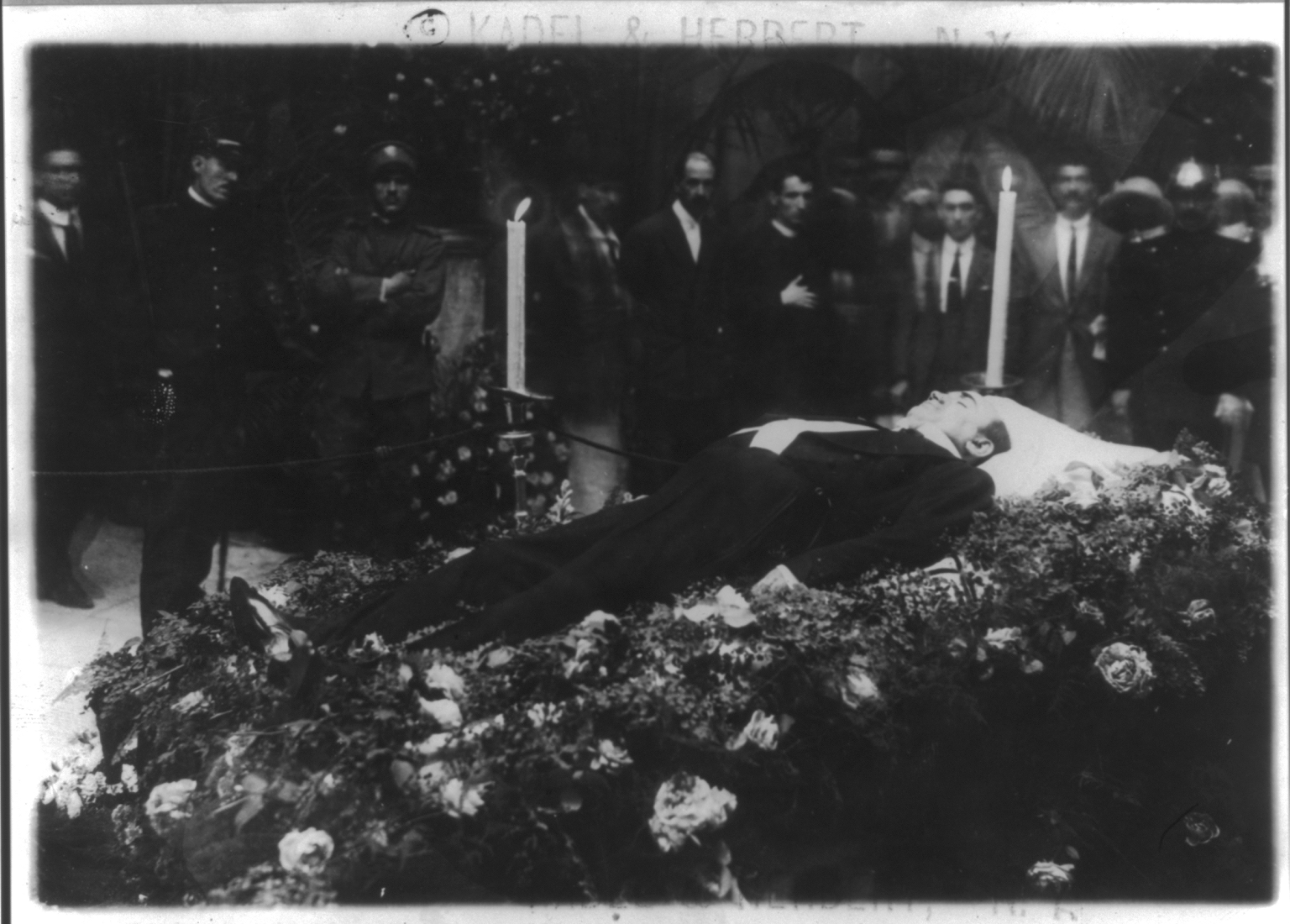
Caruso's body lying in state in the Vesuvio Hotel in Naples.

"Doro, I can't breathe!"
— Enrico Caruso, Italian operatic tenor (2 August 1921), dying of peritonitis

"I'm dying, I'm dying...he hurt me!"
— Virginia Rappe, American model and silent film actress (9 September 1921)

"You are always wanting me to give up things, what is it I ought to give up?"
— Ernest Shackleton, Anglo-Irish Antarctic Explorer (5 January 1922)

"Thy Holy Will be done. Jesus, Jesus, come! Yes, yes. My Jesus as Thou willst it, Jesus."
— Charles I of Austria, the last Emperor of Austria (1 April 1922), while dying of pneumonia

"I am coming, Katie!"
— Herbert Rowse Armstrong, English solicitor (31 May 1922), prior to execution by hanging for the murder of his wife, Katharine Mary Friend Armstrong

"No." (Note: Also reported as, "But I have to. So little done. So much to do" (to his wife, who had asked him not to hurry while dictating).)
(signing 'no' in sign language)
— Alexander Graham Bell, Scottish-American inventor (2 August 1922), replying to his deaf wife Mabel's plea "Don't leave me."

"Forgive them. Bury me in Glasnevin with the boys."
— Michael Collins, Irish revolutionary, soldier and politician (22 August 1922), mortally wounded in anti-Treaty IRA ambush

"Mafia, Mafia, Mafia."
— Richie Rose, American police officer from the Denver Police Department (31 October 1922), apparently shot by bootleggers

"Yes, my dear Robert, you are."
— Marcel Proust, French novelist (18 November 1922), to his brother, who asked if he was hurting him

"Take a step or two closer, lads. It will be easier that way."
— Erskine Childers, English-born Irish writer (24 November 1922), facing a firing squad

"I believe... I'm going to die. I love the rain. I want the feeling of it on my face."
— Katherine Mansfield, New Zealand modernist writer (9 January 1923)

"How slow my death agony is."
— Sarah Bernhardt, French actress (26 March 1923)

"I believe everything I have written about immortality."
— William Robertson Nicoll, Scottish minister and writer (4 May 1923)

"I thought this was the most beautiful spot in the world, and now I know it."
— W. P. Ker, Scottish literary scholar (17 July 1923), to his hiking companions on the Pizzo Bianco before suffering a heart attack

"That's good. Go on, read some more."
— Warren G. Harding, president of the United States (2 August 1923), to his wife, Florence Harding, who had been reading aloud a flattering Saturday Evening Post article about him

"Good dog."
("хорошая собака.")
— Vladimir Lenin, Russian communist statesman and revolutionary (21 January 1924), to his dog who brought him a dead bird

"When the machinery is broken... I am ready."
— Woodrow Wilson, president of the United States (3 February 1924)

"We must stir ourselves. Move on! Work, work! Cover me! Must move on! Must work! Cover me!"
— Eleonora Duse, Italian actress (21 April 1924)

"Kill me, or else you are a murderer!"
("Töten Sie mich, sonst sind Sie ein Mörder!")
— Franz Kafka, German-speaking Bohemian novelist and short-story writer (3 June 1924), asking his doctors for morphine overdose while dying of tuberculosis

"Dear Gerda, I thank you for every day we have been together."
— Ferruccio Busoni, Italian composer (27 July 1924), to his wife

"So this is what it is like to die – it takes a long time!"
— Anatole France, French writer and journalist (12 October 1924)

"You're too slow...too slow."
— Floyd Collins, American cave explorer (c. 13 February 1925), to rescue workers trying to free him from his entrapment in Sand Cave, Kentucky

"Ah, the cows..."
— Erik Satie, French composer and pianist (1 July 1925)

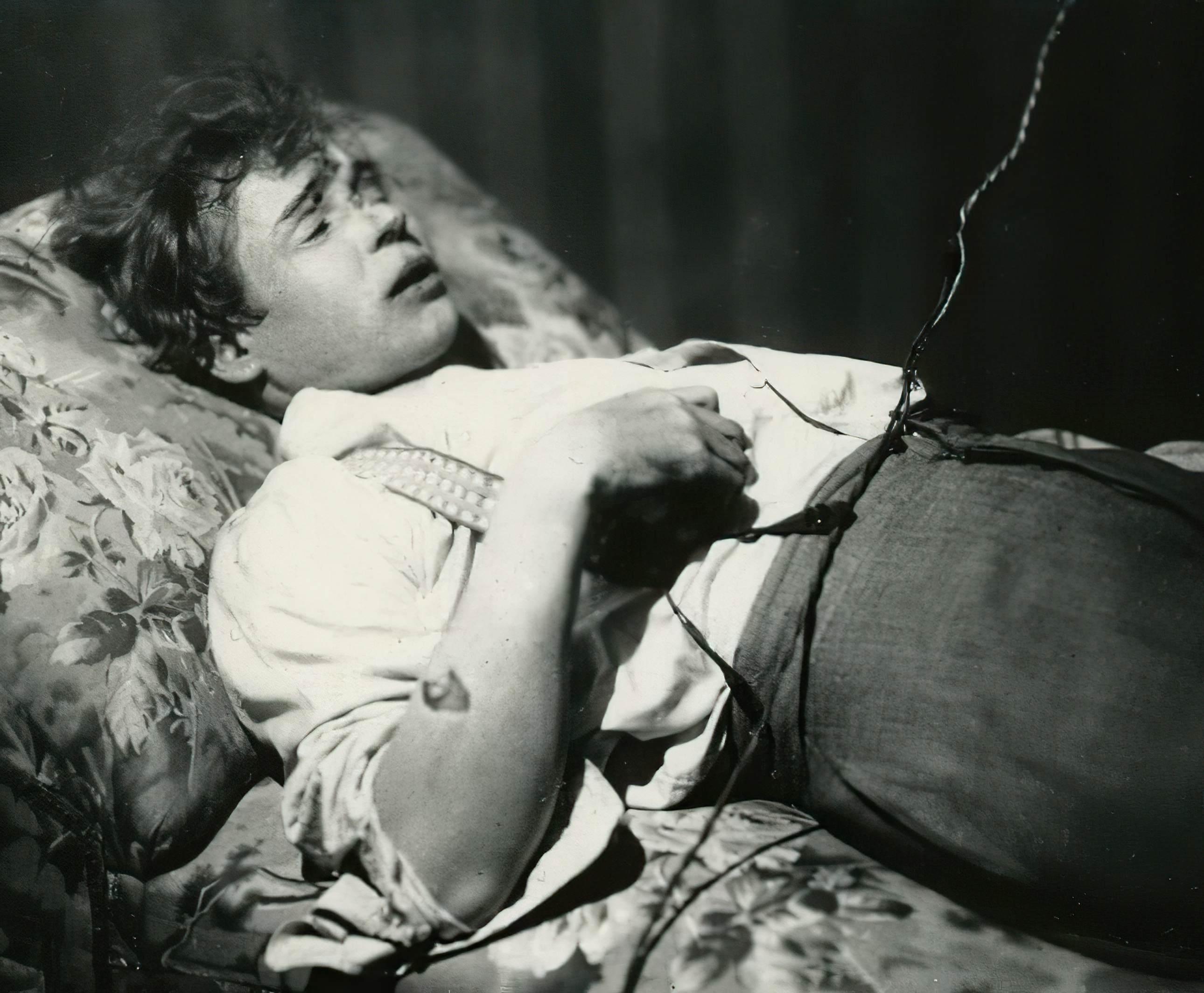
Yesenin's corpse in his hotel room.

"Goodbye, my friend, goodbye. My dear, you are in my heart. Predestined separation promises a future meeting."
("До свиданья, друг мой, до свиданья. / Милый мой, ты у меня в груди. / Предназначенное расставанье / Обещает встречу впереди.")
— Sergei Yesenin, Russian lyric poet (28 December 1925), in his final poem before allegedly taking his own life

"Well, we fooled 'em for a long time, didn't we?"
— Zip the Pinhead, American freak show performer (9 April 1926)

"I don't feel good."
— Luther Burbank, American botanist (11 April 1926)

"Don't pull down the blinds. I want the sunlight to greet me."
— Rudolph Valentino, Italian actor (23 August 1926), to a nurse

"I don't want the doctor's death. I want to have my own freedom."
— Rainer Maria Rilke, Bohemian-Austrian poet and novelist (29 December 1926)

"We fought true."
— Lala VC, Indian World War I Victoria Cross recipient (23 March 1927), dying of polio

"So many people who knew the condition of Amritsar say I did right...but so many others say I did wrong. I only want to die and know from my Maker whether I did right or wrong."
— Reginald Dyer, British Indian Army officer (23 July 1927). In 1919, Dyer ordered the troops under his command to fire into a crowd of protesting Indian independence activists in Jallianwala Bagh, Punjab, killing at least 379 people and wounding over 1,200 others.

"Probably no one who attempts suicide—is fully aware of all his motives, which are usually too complex. At least in my case it is prompted by a vague sense of anxiety—about my own future. — As for my vague sense of anxiety about my own future, I think I analyzed it all in 'A Fool's Life,' except for a social factor, namely the shadow of feudalism cast over my life. This I omitted purposely, not at all certain that I could really clarify the social context in which I lived. — P.S. Reading a life of Empedocles, I felt how old is this desire to make a god of oneself. This letter, so far as I am conscious, never attempts this. On the contrary, I consider myself one of the most common humans. You may recall those days of twenty years ago when we discussed 'Empedocles on Etna'—under the linden trees. In those days I was one who wished to make a god of myself."
— Ryūnosuke Akutagawa, Japanese writer (24 July 1927); excerpt from his suicide note

"Farewell, mother!"
— Nicola Sacco, Italian immigrant anarchist (23 August 1927), prior to execution by electrocution

"I wish to forgive some people for what they are now doing to me."
— Bartolomeo Vanzetti, Italian immigrant anarchist (23 August 1927), prior to execution by electrocution

"Farewell, my friends. I go to glory!" (Note: Also reported as, "I am off to love" ("Je vais à l'amour") by Glenway Wescott.)
("Adieu, mes amis. Je vais à la gloire!")
— Isadora Duncan, American/French dancer (14 September 1927), just before dying in freak car accident

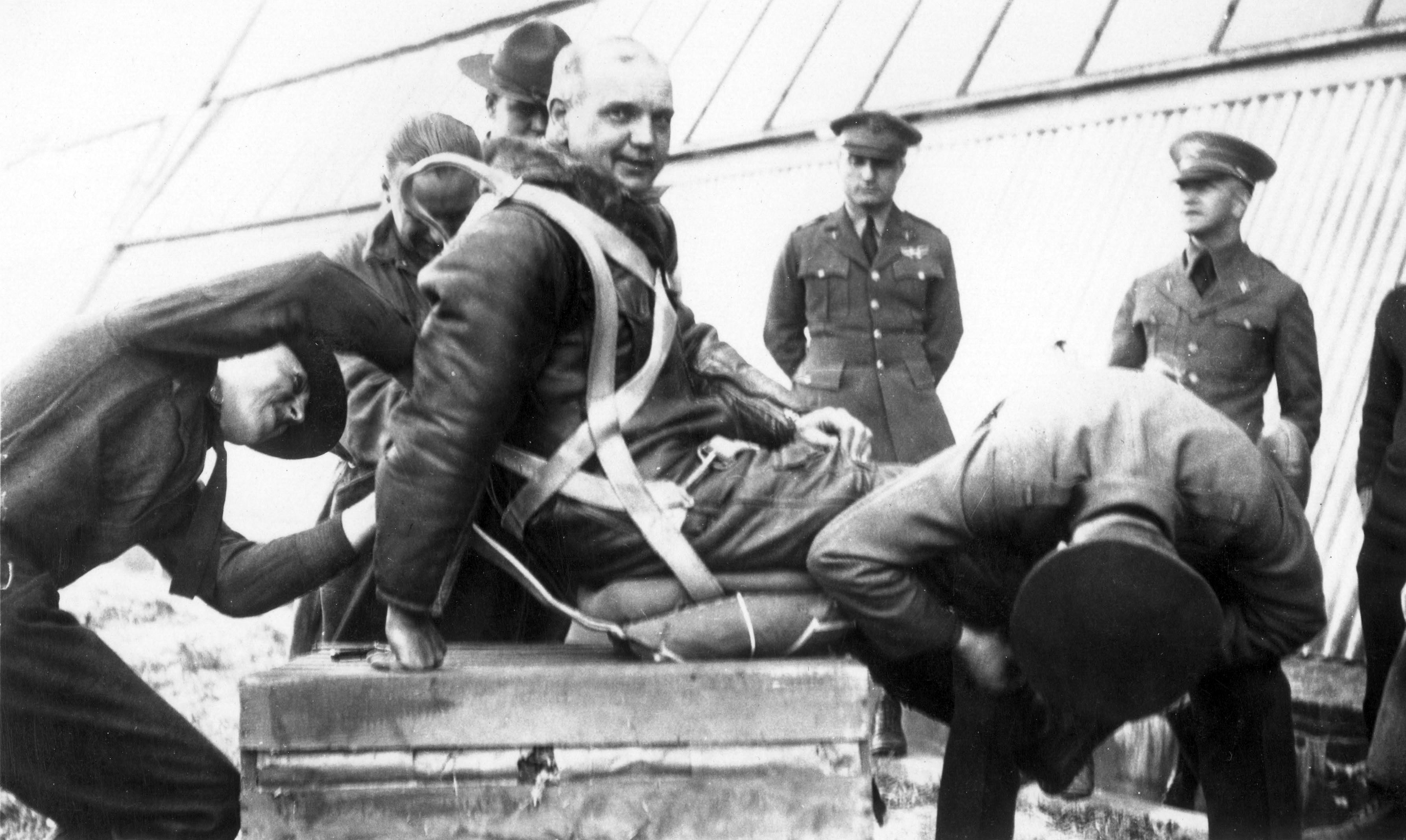
Hawthorne C. Gray prior to fatal altitude record attempt.

"Sky deep blue, sun very bright, sand [buoyancy compensator] all gone."
— Hawthorne C. Gray, American aeronaut (4 November 1927), final journal entry during balloon altitude record attempt

"Long live Christ the King!"
("¡Viva Cristo Rey!")
— Miguel Pro, Mexican Jesuit Catholic priest (23 November 1927), prior to execution by firing squad on false charges of sedition

"I think I'll go for a drive before dinner – anyone coming?"
— Brian Oswald Donn-Byrne, Irish novelist (18 June 1928), prior to dying in auto accident

"Well folks, you'll soon see a baked apple." (Note: Also reported as, "Well, folks, you are about to see a baked Appel" and as "Well, gentlemen, you are about to see a baked Appel.")
— George Appel, American murderer (9 August 1928), prior to execution by electrocution

"What is the news?"
— Clarence W. Barron, American newsman and de facto manager of The Wall Street Journal (2 October 1928)

"Me mudder did it."
— Arnold Rothstein, American mobster (6 November 1928), when asked who had fatally shot him

"The prettier. Now fight for it."
— Henry Arthur Jones, English dramatist (7 January 1929), when his nurse and his niece asked which of them he would prefer to stay with him

"I have nothing to ask God, he has given me everything I desired. God has made me King."
— Habibullāh Kalakāni, claimant of the titles of King and Emir of Afghanistan (1 November 1929), prior to execution

== 1930–1939 ==
"Dictionary."
— Joseph Wright, compiler of The English Dialect Dictionary (27 February 1930)

"I think it is time for morphine."
— D. H. Lawrence, English writer and poet (2 March 1930)

"How are the lads? Did we do it?"
— Henry Segrave, British land speed and water speed record pioneer (13 June 1930), mortally injured in crash of Miss England II. He was asking his wife about the fates of his chief engineer (who was killed) and his mechanic (who survived), and whether they had broken the water speed record (they had).

"You are wonderful."
— Arthur Conan Doyle, British physician, author and spiritualist (7 July 1930), spoken to his wife in their garden; he proceeded to clutch his chest and die

"Hurry it up, you Hoosier bastard! I could hang a dozen men while you're fooling around!" (Note: Also reported as, "Hurry up you bastard, I could kill 10 men while you're fooling around!" and as "Yes, hurry it up, you Hoosier bastard! I could kill a dozen men while you're screwing around!")
— Carl Panzram, American serial killer and rapist (5 September 1930), spitting in his executioner's face prior to hanging

"Get my Swan costume ready."
("Приготовьте мой костюм лебедя!")
— Anna Pavlova, Russian prima ballerina, creator of the role of The Dying Swan (23 January 1931)

"Long live Revolution"
("ਇੰਕਿਲਮ ਜ਼ਿੰਦਾਬਾਦ!")
— Bhagat Singh, Indian revolutionary and Socialist, founder of Hindustan Socialist republican association (23 March 1931)

"Everything's gone wrong, my girl." (Note: Also reported as, "Everything is going wrong, my girl.")
— Arnold Bennett, English writer (27 March 1931), to his mistress, Dorothy Cheston

"The following is a report on the measurement of the velocity of light made at the Irvine Ranch, near Santa Ana, California, during the period of September 1929 to—."
— Albert A. Michelson, American physicist (9 May 1931), writing in a scientific log

"Well, goodbye all"
— Raymond Hamilton, member of Barrow Gang (10 May 1935), before dying in the electric chair

"Splendid. The finale just a little too fast."
— Eugène Ysaÿe (12 May 1931), Belgian violinist, composer and conductor, after his Fourth Sonata was played for him

"Doctor, I'm fighting for my life!"
— David Belasco, American playwright and theater impresario (14 May 1931)

"After my head is chopped off, will I still be able to hear, at least for a moment, the sound of my own blood gushing from the stump of my neck? That would be the pleasure to end all pleasures."
— Peter Kürten, German serial killer known as "The Vampire of Düsseldorf" (2 July 1931), prior to execution by guillotine

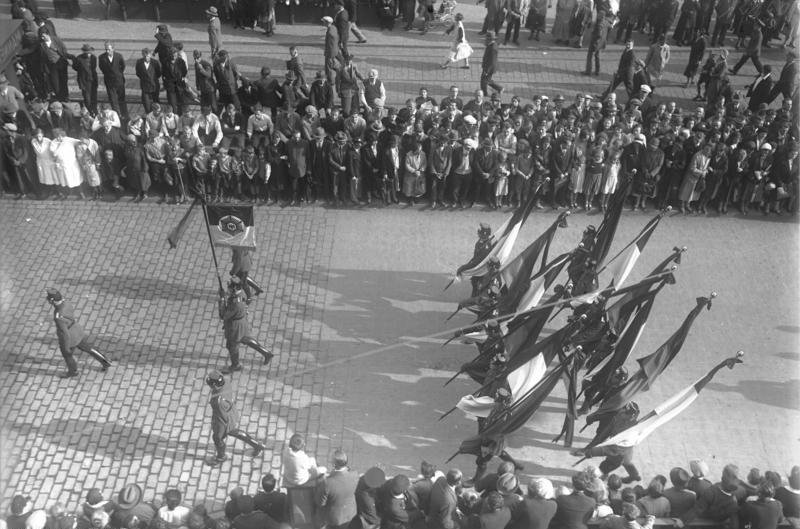
Funeral of Paul Anlauf and Franz Lenck.

"So long...Goodbye..."
("Wiedersehen...Gruss...")
— Paul Anlauf, German police captain (9 August 1931), assassinated by members of the Communist Party of Germany including Erich Mielke

"It's very beautiful over there."
— Thomas Edison, American inventor (18 October 1931), speaking words of unclear meaning as he was dying

"They tried to get me — I got them first!"
— Vachel Lindsay, American poet (5 December 1931), in his suicide note

"You sons of bitches. Give my love to Mother."
— Francis Crowley, American murderer (21 January 1932), prior to execution by electrocution

"If this is dying, then I don't think much of it."
— Lytton Strachey, English writer and critic (21 January 1932)

"To my friends / My work is done / Why wait? / G.E."
— George Eastman, American entrepreneur (14 March 1932), as his suicide note, before shooting himself in the chest

"Goodbye, everybody!"
— Hart Crane, American poet (27 April 1932), prior to jumping off a cruise ship

″Well, wait, you'll understand once we talk. It's day, you need not shoot me.″
("まあ、待て、話をすればわかるだろう。撃たんでもええ、、")
- Tsuyoshi Inukai, former Prime Minister of Japan (15 May 1932), assassinated by Taku Mikami

"Curtain! Fast music! Lights! Ready for the last finale! Great! The show looks good. The show looks good."
— Florenz Ziegfeld Jr., American Broadway impresario (22 July 1932)

"No good!"
— Zhang Zongchang (3 September 1932), Chinese warlord, after being shot by an assassin

"Good morning, Robert."
— Calvin Coolidge, president of the United States (5 January 1933), to a carpenter working on his house

"The important thing is knowing how to live. Learn a lesson from my mistakes. I had too much power before I knew how to use it and it defeated me in the end. It drove all sweetness out of my life except the affection of my children. My trouble was I was born too late for the last generation and too early for this one. If you want to be happy, live in your own time."
— Alva Belmont, American socialite and women's suffrage activist (26 January 1933)

"Take that tent thing off me and give me something to drink. Quit shooting that stuff into my arm and leave me alone. I'm going to get well."
— Anton Cermak, Mayor of Chicago (6 March 1933), in hospital after being wounded in assassination attempt on Franklin D. Roosevelt; last reported words

"Why should I talk to you? I've just been talking to your boss."
— Wilson Mizner, American playwright and entrepreneur (3 April 1933), to a priest at his deathbed

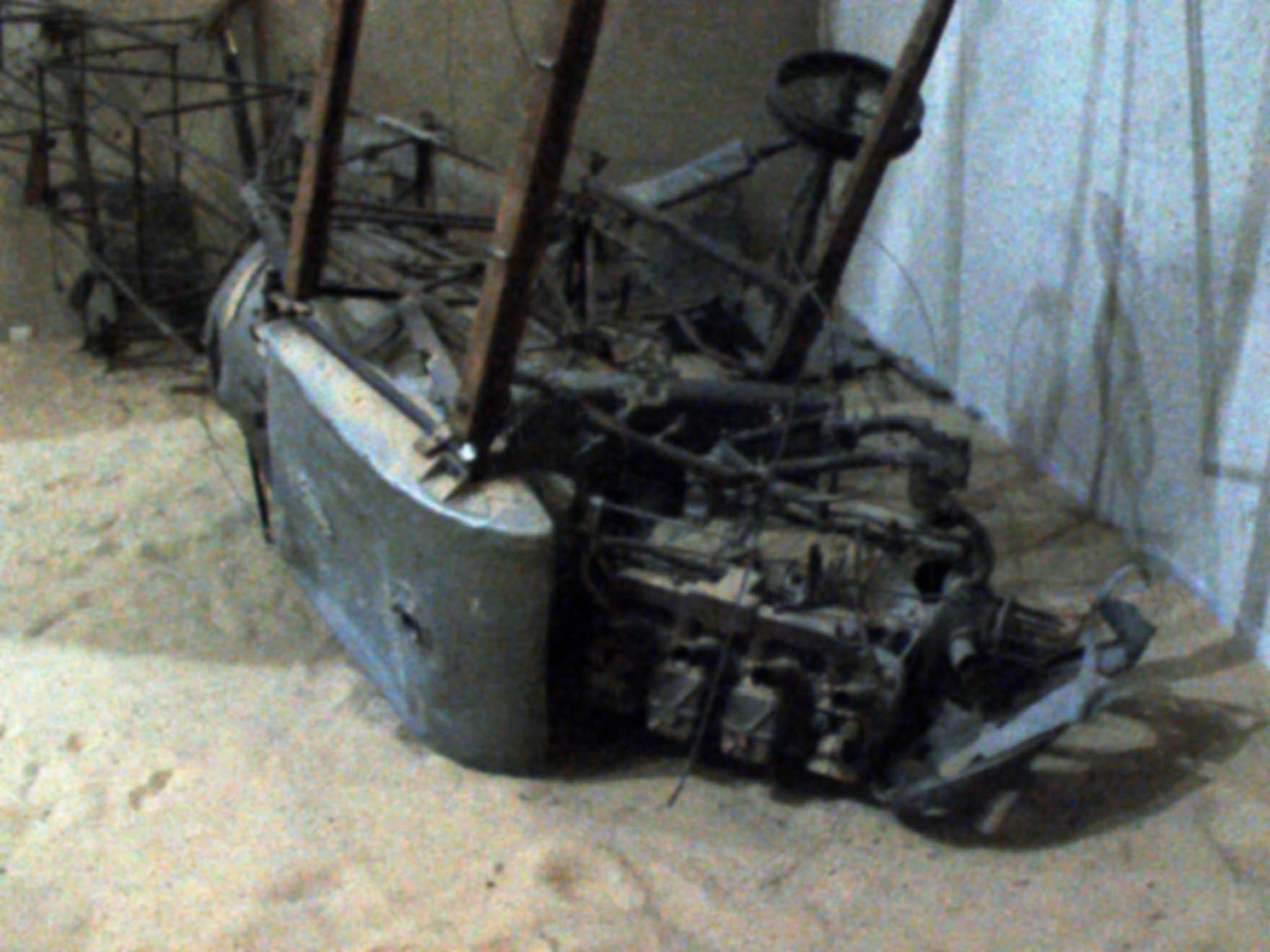
Wreckage of Bill Lancaster's plane, the Southern Cross Minor.

"So the beginning of the eighth day has dawned. It is still cool. I have no water....I am waiting patiently. Come soon please. Fever wracked me last night. Hope you get my full log. Bill."
— Bill Lancaster, Australian aviator (20 April 1933), final note written on fuel card while dying after crash in Sahara Desert

"I butted him."
— Jack Holland, American college football player and boxer (9 May 1933), while leaving ring after loss to Tony Marullo; he then collapsed from a cerebral hemorrhage

"Follow the path for another fifty yards. I am going back to the foot of the rocks to make another climb. If I feel in good form I shall take the difficult way up; if I do not I shall take the easy one. I shall join you in an hour."
— Albert I of Belgium (17 February 1934), shortly before falling to his death while rock climbing

"Ella, Ella! Everything is utterly different!"
("Ella, Ella! Kõik on täiesti teisiti!")
— Ernst Enno, Estonian writer (7 March 1934), to his wife

"To Frances and all my friends-goodbye"
— Karl Dane, Danish-American comedian and actor (14 April 1934), wrote it on his suicide note

"I don't want it."
("Je ne le veux pas.")
— Marie Skłodowska Curie, Polish scientist (4 July 1934), upon being offered a painkilling injection

"It's gone, mother! Gone, gone, gone!"
— Winsor McCay, American cartoonist and animator (26 July 1934), to his wife after he found that his right arm was paralyzed

"I suffer terribly. I am thirsty."
— Louis Barthou, French Minister of Foreign Affairs (9 October 1934), killed by police gunfire during the response to Alexander I of Yugoslavia's assassination.

"What happened? It got me in the thigh."
— Clyde Smith, Australian rules footballer and police constable (5 January 1935), accidentally shot by police colleague

"All right! Go ahead!"
— Ma Barker, American mother of criminals (16 January 1935), to her son, Fred Barker, prior to their deaths in a shootout with the FBI

"Always, always. Water for me."
— Jane Addams, American settlement and temperance activist, social worker and author (21 May 1935), when her physician asked if she wanted some water

"Death."
— Will Rogers, American stage and film actor, vaudeville performer, cowboy, humorist, newspaper columnist, and social commentator (15 August 1935), typed on his typewriter for an unfinished newspaper column prior to the plane crash that killed him and Wiley Post

"When all usefulness is over, when one is assured of an unavoidable and imminent death, it is the simplest of human rights to choose a quick and easy death in place of a slow and horrible one."
— Charlotte Perkins Gilman, American humanist and writer (17 August 1935), in her suicide note

"Telephone and say that they must still enlarge it–Always larger, broader, more universal–It's the only means of saving the world."
— Henri Barbusse, French novelist and Communist (30 August 1935), referring to the Second Italo-Ethiopian War

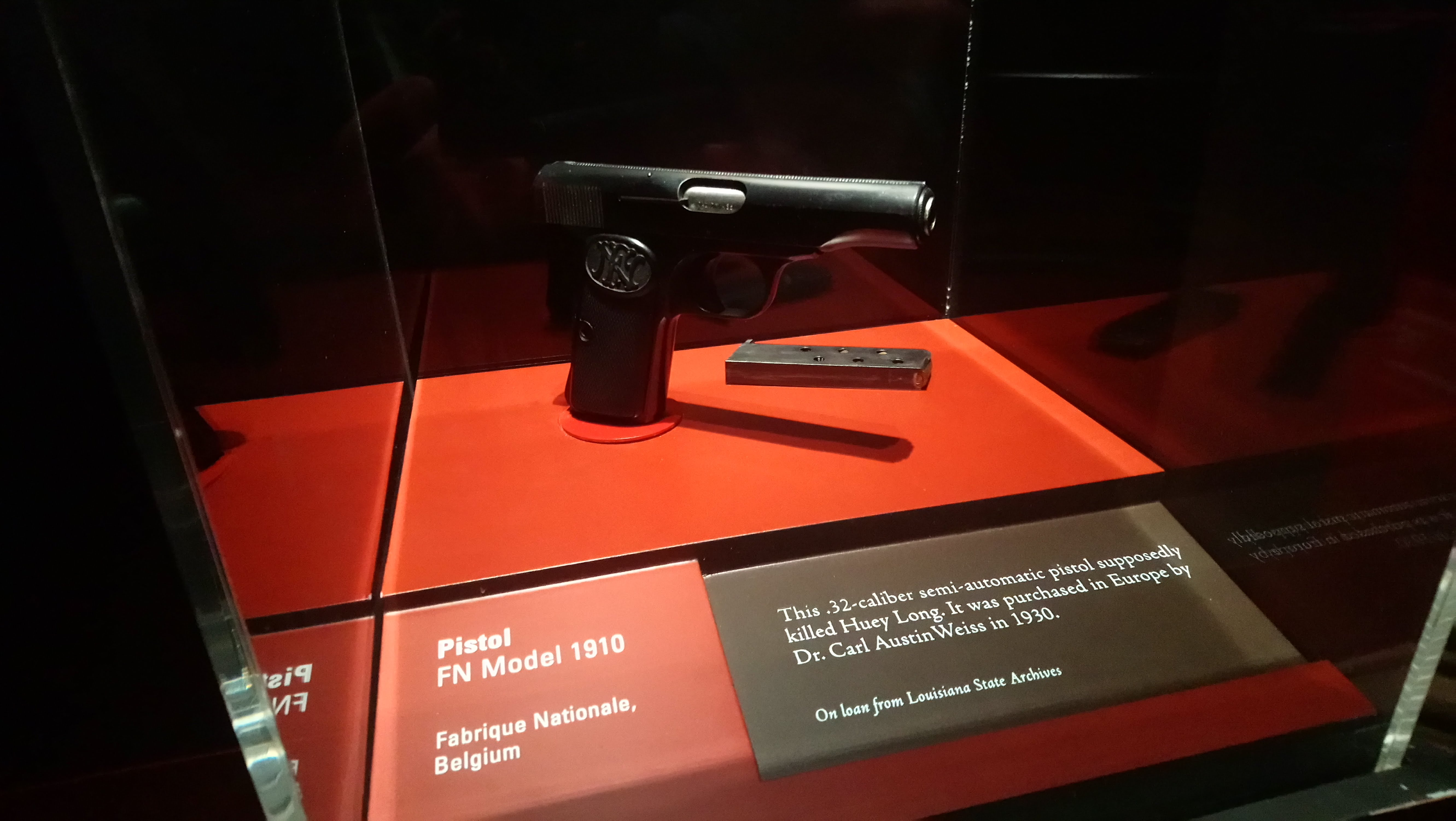
Pistol supposedly used to kill Huey Long.

"I wonder why he shot me." (Note: Also reported as, "Later, Seymour, later", "I wonder what will happen to my poor university boys", "I have so much to do" and "Shit".)
— Huey Long, United States Senator (10 September 1935), after being fatally shot

"The Baron says these things. I know what I am doing here with my collection of papers. It isn't worth a nickel to two guys like you or me but to a collector it is worth a fortune. It is priceless. I am going to turn it over to... Turn your back to me, please Henry. I am so sick now. The police are getting many complaints. Look out. I want that G-note. Look out for Jimmy Valentine for he is an old pal of mine. Come on, come on, Jim. Ok, ok, I am all through. Can't do another thing. Look out mamma, look out for her. You can't beat him. Police, mamma, Helen, mother, please take me out. I will settle the indictment. Come on, open the soap duckets. The chimney sweeps. Talk to the sword. Shut up, you got a big mouth! Please help me up, Henry. Max, come over here. French-Canadian bean soup. I want to pay. Let them leave me alone."
— Dutch Schultz, American mobster (24 October 1935), speaking in stream-of-consciousness babble after being shot

"Give me the glasses."
("Dá-me os óculos.")
– Fernando Pessoa, Portuguese poet (30 November 1935), to the nurse who treated him

"But I have so little time." (Note: Also reported as, "An upbeat. An upbeat" ("Auftakt. Auftakt").)
— Alban Berg, Austrian composer (24 December 1935), to his wife, who had asked him to relax

"What a thrill it will be to die in the electric chair... the supreme thrill, the only one I haven't tried."
— Albert Fish, American serial killer, child rapist and cannibal (16 January 1936), prior to execution by electrocution

"God damn you!" (Note: Also reported as, "Bugger Bognor", "Gentlemen, I am sorry for keeping you waiting like this. I am unable to concentrate" and "How is the Empire?")
— George V, king of the United Kingdom (20 January 1936), to a nurse giving him a sedative. The King was euthanized on the orders of his doctor, Bertrand Dawson, 1st Viscount Dawson of Penn.

"I think I'm going to make it."
— Richard A. Loeb, American murderer (28 January 1936), after being slashed 56 times with a razor in a prison fight

"Indeed – very good. I shall – have to repeat – that – on the Golden Floor."
— A. E. Housman, English classical scholar and poet (30 April 1936), to his doctor, who had just told a risqué joke

"All fled, all done, so lift me on the pyre. The feast is over, and the lamps expire."
— Robert E. Howard, American author and creator of Conan the Barbarian (11 June 1936); his suicide note, a quotation from "The House of Cæsar" by Viola Garvin

"The issue is now clear. It is between light and darkness, and everyone must choose his side." (Note: Also reported as, "Hello my darling [to his wife], hello my dear [to his secretary].")
— G. K. Chesterton, English writer, philosopher, lay theologian and critic (14 June 1936)

"I cannot go on."
("Ich kann nicht mehr.")
— Toni Kurz, German mountain climber (22 July 1936), dying on the Eiger north face

"I am starting to believe you are not intending to count me among your friends!"
— Pedro Muñoz Seca, Spanish comic playwright (28 November 1936), to his firing squad during the Paracuellos massacres

"The hearse, the horse, the driver and—enough!"
— Luigi Pirandello, Italian playwright (10 December 1936)

"My God, how it hurts! Oh I suffer!"
— André Bessette, C.S.C., Canadian Roman Catholic lay brother (6 January 1937)

"Kurt."
— Alfred Adler, Austrian psychotherapist (28 May 1937), mumbling his son's name after collapsing on the street

"I can't sleep."
— J. M. Barrie, Scottish novelist and playwright (19 June 1937)

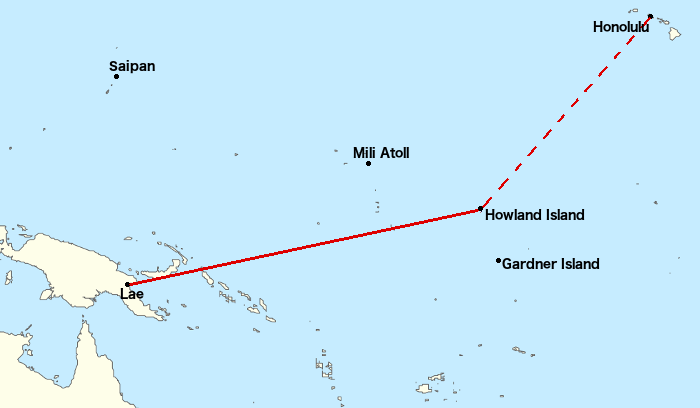
Amelia Earhart and her aircraft disappeared in the Pacific Ocean during her attempted world circumnavigation.

"We are running on line north and south."
— Amelia Earhart, American aviation pioneer (c. 2 July 1937), reporting to her headquarters in her last known radio transmission shortly before her disappearance

"I'm going, but I'm going in the name of the Lord."
— Bessie Smith, American blues singer (26 September 1937)

"Tell the girls to keep on going ahead. Put over the boule with a bang. Don't let my passing throw the slightest shadow of gloom. The organization has a grand mission before it."
— Violette Neatley Anderson, first African-American woman to practice law before the United States Supreme Court (24 December 1937); speaking to Claude Albert Barnett while dying of cancer prior to Zeta Phi Beta's annual boule

"I look like a Moor."
— Maurice Ravel, French composer (28 December 1937), referring to the bandages on his head after brain surgery

"Snooks, will you please turn this way? I like to look at your face."
— O. O. McIntyre, American newspaper columnist (14 February 1938), to his wife

"Stop—I turn home... I'm bored... I'm bored."
— Gabriele D'Annunzio, Italian author and soldier (1 March 1938), to his chauffeur

"Watch out, please."
— Egon Friedell, Austrian polymath (16 March 1938), before jumping out a window to avoid capture by Gestapo

"¡Mi madre! ¡Mi madre! Where is my mother? I'm all alone in this country. Don't leave me, Jack."
— Alfonso, Prince of Asturias, former heir apparent to the throne of Spain (6 September 1938), dying of internal bleeding after car accident in Miami, Florida

"Peace be upon you."
("Aleykümesselam.")
— Mustafa Kemal Atatürk, President of Turkey (10 November 1938)

"I am sick – I have a fever..."
("Ich bin krank – ich habe Fieber...")
— Paul Morgan, Austrian actor and cabaret performer (10 December 1938), said prior to collapsing and dying of exhaustion in Buchenwald concentration camp

"Do not blame anyone. It's my fault."
— Valery Chkalov, Soviet test pilot (15 December 1938), fatally injured in crash of Polikarpov I-180 fighter prototype

"I'm all shot to hell!"
— Arthur Barker, American criminal (13 January 1939), shot while attempting to escape from Alcatraz Federal Penitentiary

"You can refute Hegel, but not the Saint or the Song of Sixpence." (Note: Also reported as, "If I die, bury me up there, and then in a year's time, when the newspapers have forgotten me, dig me up and plant me in Sligo.")
— W. B. Yeats, Irish poet and dramatist (28 January 1939)

"Peace, Peace."
("Pace, Pace.")
— Pope Pius XI, Italian Roman Catholic prelate and Pope (10 February 1939)

"I didn't know prisons had such comfortable beds."
— Nicholas Comper, English aviator and aircraft designer (17 June 1939), dying in hospital after being knocked down while lighting a firework in Hythe, Kent, by a passer-by to whom he claimed he was an IRA man planning to blow up the town hall

"I was going too fast for the conditions – it was entirely my own fault – I am sorry."
— Richard Seaman, British racing driver (25 June 1939), on his deathbed after being fatally burned in a racing crash (Note: Seaman also said to his wife, "I am afraid you must go to the cinema alone after all".)

"The meager satisfaction that man can extract from reality leaves him starving." (Note: Also reported as, "Now it is nothing but torture and makes no sense anymore.")
— Sigmund Freud, Austrian neurologist, founder of psychoanalysis (23 September 1939)

"Never felt better."
— Douglas Fairbanks, American actor and filmmaker (12 December 1939), to an attendant who asked how he was

== 1940–1949 ==
"I am only asking for one thing—let me finish my work." (Note: Year of death incorrectly given by Brahms as 1941.)
— Isaac Babel, Russian author (27 January 1940), prior to execution by firing squad on fabricated charges of terrorism and espionage

"I feel this time they have succeeded. I do not want them to undress me. I want you to undress me." (Note: Also reported as, "I will not survive this attack. Stalin has finally accomplished the task he attempted unsuccessfully before.")
— Leon Trotsky, Soviet revolutionary (21 August 1940), to his wife, Natalia Sedova, while being prepared for surgery after being mortally wounded by assassin Ramón Mercader

"For Catalonia!"
("Per Catalunya!")
— Lluís Companys, President of the Government of Catalonia (15 October 1940), prior to execution by firing squad

"I've finished a 109—Whoopee!"
— John Dundas, Second World War British fighter ace (28 November 1940), prior to being shot down and killed

"Hershey bars will be good enough – they'll be fine."
— F. Scott Fitzgerald, American novelist (21 December 1940), to Sheilah Graham

”But the real way To get happiness is by giving out happiness to other people. Try and leave this world better then you found it and when your turn comes to die, you can die happy in feeling that at any rate You have not wasted your time but have done your best. “Be Prepared” in this way, live happy and die happy - stick to your scout promise always - even after you have ceased to be a boy - and god help you to do it. Your friend, Baden Powell”
- Robert Baden Powell, founder of Scouting America (8 January 1941), in note found after death

"Does nobody understand?"
— James Joyce, Irish novelist, author of Ulysses and Finnegans Wake (13 January 1941)

"We'll capture the objective."
— Richhpal Ram VC, Indian recipient of the Victoria Cross (12 February 1941), mortally wounded at Keren, Eritrea

"Spain, My God!"
— Alfonso XIII, former King of Spain (28 February 1941), kissing a crucifix

"I don't think two people could have been happier than we have been."
— Virginia Woolf, English writer (28 March 1941), addressing her husband Leonard in her suicide note, drowning herself later that day

"It's coming to an end for me, I'm sinking, I'm sinking!"
("Es geht mit mir zu Ende, ich versinke, ich versinke!")
— Wilhelm II, the last German Emperor (4 June 1941), dying of a pulmonary embolism at Huis Doorn

"My love of God is greater than my fear of death."
— Cecil Pugh, GC, MA, Congregational Church minister (5 July 1941), asking to be lowered into the hold of the sinking SS Anselm, where injured airmen were trapped. Pugh then prayed with the men until the ship sank.

"Love the immaculate, love the immaculate, love the immaculate."
— Maximilian Kolbe, Polish Catholic priest, promoter of veneration of the Immaculate Virgin Mary (14 August 1941), injected with carbolic acid after two weeks of starvation in Auschwitz concentration camp. He had offered himself for starvation in the place of an inmate with a family.

"Did I get Jimmy out?"
— Karl Gravell, GC, Royal Canadian Air Force Leading Aircraftman (10 November 1941), after unsuccessful attempt to rescue Flying Officer James Robinson from wreckage of crashed Tiger Moth

"Farewell, comrades! Fight, do not be afraid! Stalin is with us! Stalin will come!"
("Прощайте товарищи! Боритесь, не бойтесь! Сталин с нами! Сталин придёт!")
— Zoya Kosmodemyanskaya, Soviet partisan (29 November 1941), prior to her execution by Germans in Petrishchevo for arson in there

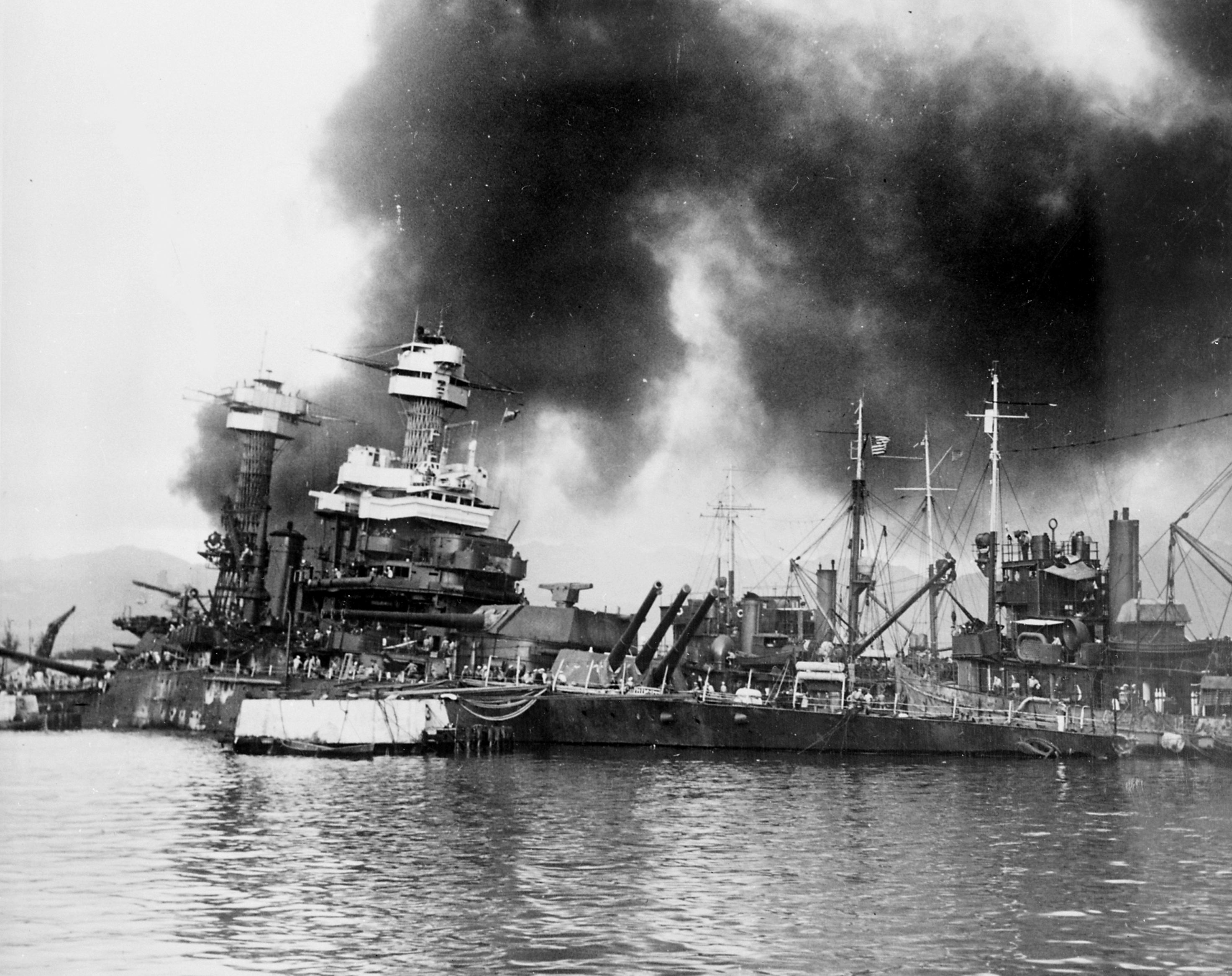
USS California (BB-44) sinking after being torpedoed at Pearl Harbor.

"Leave me alone! I am done for. Get out of here before the magazines go off."
— Herbert C. Jones, United States Navy officer and Medal of Honor recipient (7 December 1941), mortally wounded aboard USS California (BB-44) during the attack on Pearl Harbor

"As long as I can give these people air, I'm sticking." (Note: Also reported as, "This is my station and I will stay and give them air as long as the guns are going.")
— Robert R. Scott, United States Navy sailor and Medal of Honor recipient (7 December 1941), refusing to evacuate flooded air compressor compartment aboard USS California (BB-44) during the attack on Pearl Harbor

"If you survive, never forget what is happening here, give evidence, write and rewrite, keep alive each word and each gesture, each cry and each tear!" (Note: These last words are regarded as legendary.)
— Simon Dubnow, Jewish-born Russian historian, writer and activist (8 December 1941), prior to his murder in the Riga Ghetto at the time of the Rumbula massacre

"Going outside to fight it out."
— John K. Lawson, Canadian Army officer (19 December 1941), over the radio to his commanders prior to leaving his headquarters building during the Battle of Hong Kong

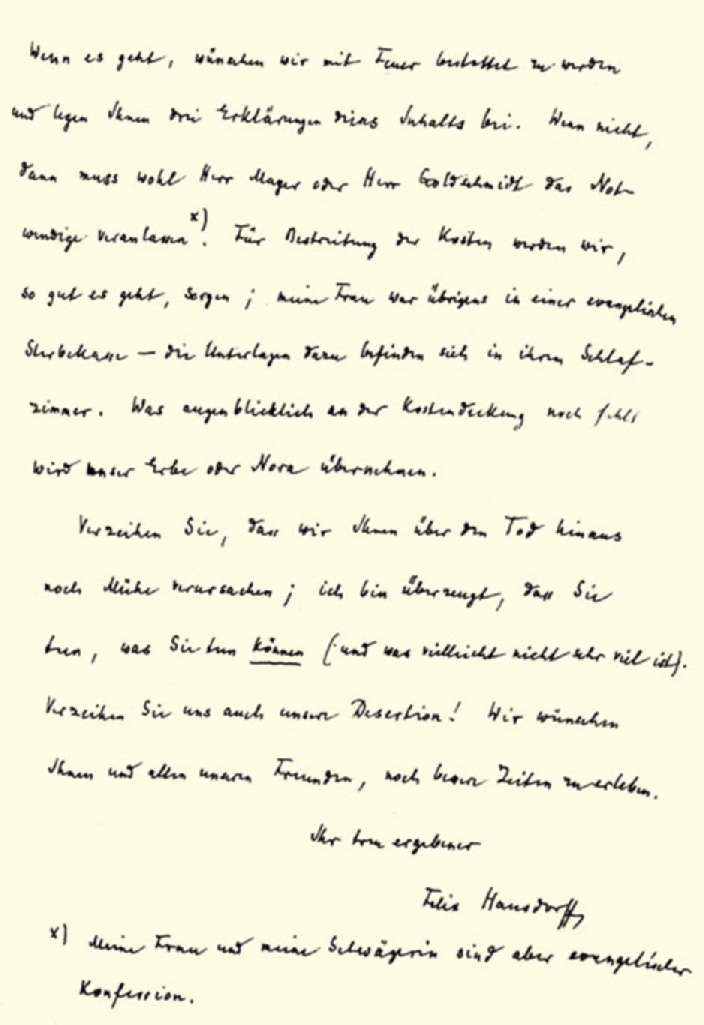
The final page of Hausdorff's suicide letter.

"I am sorry that we cause you yet more effort beyond death, and I am convinced that you are doing what you can do (which perhaps is not very much). Forgive us our desertion! We wish you and all our friends to experience better times. Your truly devoted Felix Hausdorff"
("Verzeihen Sie, dass wir Ihnen über den Tod hinaus noch Mühe verursachen; ich bin überzeugt, dass Sie tun, was Sie tun können (und was vielleicht nicht sehr viel ist). Verzeihen Sie uns auch unsere Desertion! Wir wünschen Ihnen und allen unseren Freunden, noch bessere Zeiten zu erleben. Ihr treu ergebener Felix Hausdorff")
— Felix Hausdorff, German mathematician (26 January 1942); the conclusion of his suicide letter to his lawyer. Hausdorff, his wife and his sister-in-law committed suicide rather than be deported to the Endenich camp.

"No surrender for me."
— Walter Brown, VC, DCM, Australian World War I recipient of the Victoria Cross (15 February 1942), before walking toward Japanese lines carrying grenades during the Battle of Singapore (Note: Date of death officially recorded as 28 February 1942. There are alternate theories about the circumstances of Brown's death.)

"Here Olena Teliha was sitting until she was shot."
— Olena Teliha, Ukrainian poet and activist (21 February 1942); inscription written on the wall of her prison cell prior to her execution by the Gestapo

"I think it better to conclude in good time and in erect bearing a life in which intellectual labour meant the purest joy and personal freedom the highest good on Earth."
— Stefan Zweig, Austrian writer (22 February 1942), in his last testament before committing suicide with his wife, Lotte Altmann

"I have lost my mind by spells and I do not dare think what I may do in those spells. May God forgive me and I hope everyone else will forgive me even if they cannot understand. My position is too awful to endure and nobody realizes it. What an end to a life in which I tried always to do my best."
— Lucy Maud Montgomery OBE, Canadian author (24 April 1942); conclusion of note found on her bedside table after her death. It may or may not have been a suicide note.

"Take good care of your mother, your brother, and sisters. Tell them to live up to our name. God bless you, my son."
— José Abad Santos, fifth Chief Justice of the Philippines, Acting President of the Commonwealth of the Philippines (2 May 1942), bidding farewell to his son Pepito prior to execution by occupying Japanese forces. Abad Santos subsequently refused to be blindfolded for his execution and he declined the final cigarette which was offered to him.

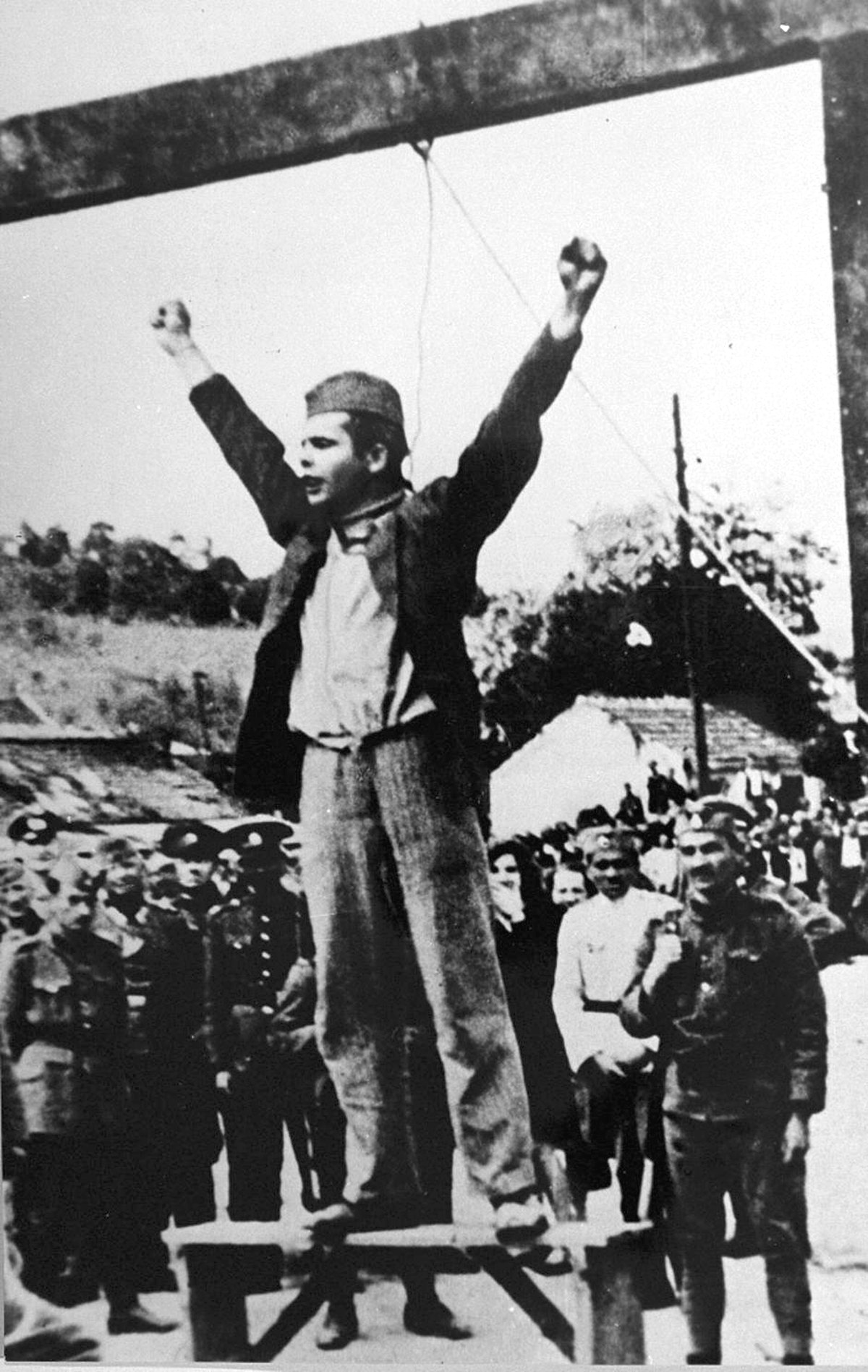
Stjepan Filipović, moments before his death.

"Death to fascism! Freedom to the people!"
("Smrt fašizmu, sloboda narodu!")
— Stjepan Filipović, Yugoslav communist (22 May 1942), seconds before execution by hanging

"You heard me, Mike." (Note: Also reported as, "Tell me Gene, is it true that you are the illegitimate son of Buffalo Bill?" (to Gene Fowler) and as "This is wonderful! What a wonderful place!" (to Lionel Barrymore).)
— John Barrymore, American actor (29 May 1942), to his brother, Lionel Barrymore, who had failed to understand something he said

(Singing "La Marseillaise")
— Félix Cadras, French lace designer and communist militant (French Communist Party) (30 May 1942), during execution by firing squad

"Oh Mother, how beautiful it is!"
— Maury Henry Biddle Paul, American journalist and society columnist (17 July 1942)

"Walter, who knows what is the scheme of things? My suffering has all been for the purpose of making you a man."
— Moses Annenberg, American newspaper publisher (20 July 1942), to his son, Walter Annenberg. Moses Annenberg had been released from prison a month earlier after being convicted of tax evasion.

"They demand from me to kill the children of my nation with my own hands. There is nothing left for me but to die." (Note: Czerniaków also wrote a letter to the Judenrat, stating, "They demanded [of me] to prepare transports of children. I cannot take it any longer, I cannot allow [the] death of innocent children; this is why I decided to do away with myself. This is not cowardice or escape. I am powerless, my heart is splitting from sorrow and compassion and I cannot bear this any longer. My deed will show the truth to all and maybe it will encourage [the] right actions. I am aware that I am leaving you with a difficult legacy.")
— Adam Czerniaków, Polish engineer and senator, head of the Warsaw Ghetto Jewish Council (Judenrat) (23 July 1942), writing to his wife prior to his suicide. The SS had ordered the Judenrat and the Jewish Ghetto Police to begin supplying 6000 people per day, including children, for deportation.

"The bastards tried to come over me last night – I guess they didn't know I was a Marine."
— Edward H. Ahrens, United States Marine Raider (8 August 1942), found mortally wounded during the Guadalcanal campaign surrounded by 13 dead Japanese soldiers

"Come, we are going for our people!"
— Edith Stein, German Jewish philosopher and Discalced Carmelite nun (9 August 1942), to her sister Rosa prior to their deportation to the Auschwitz concentration camp, where they were killed in a mass gas chamber

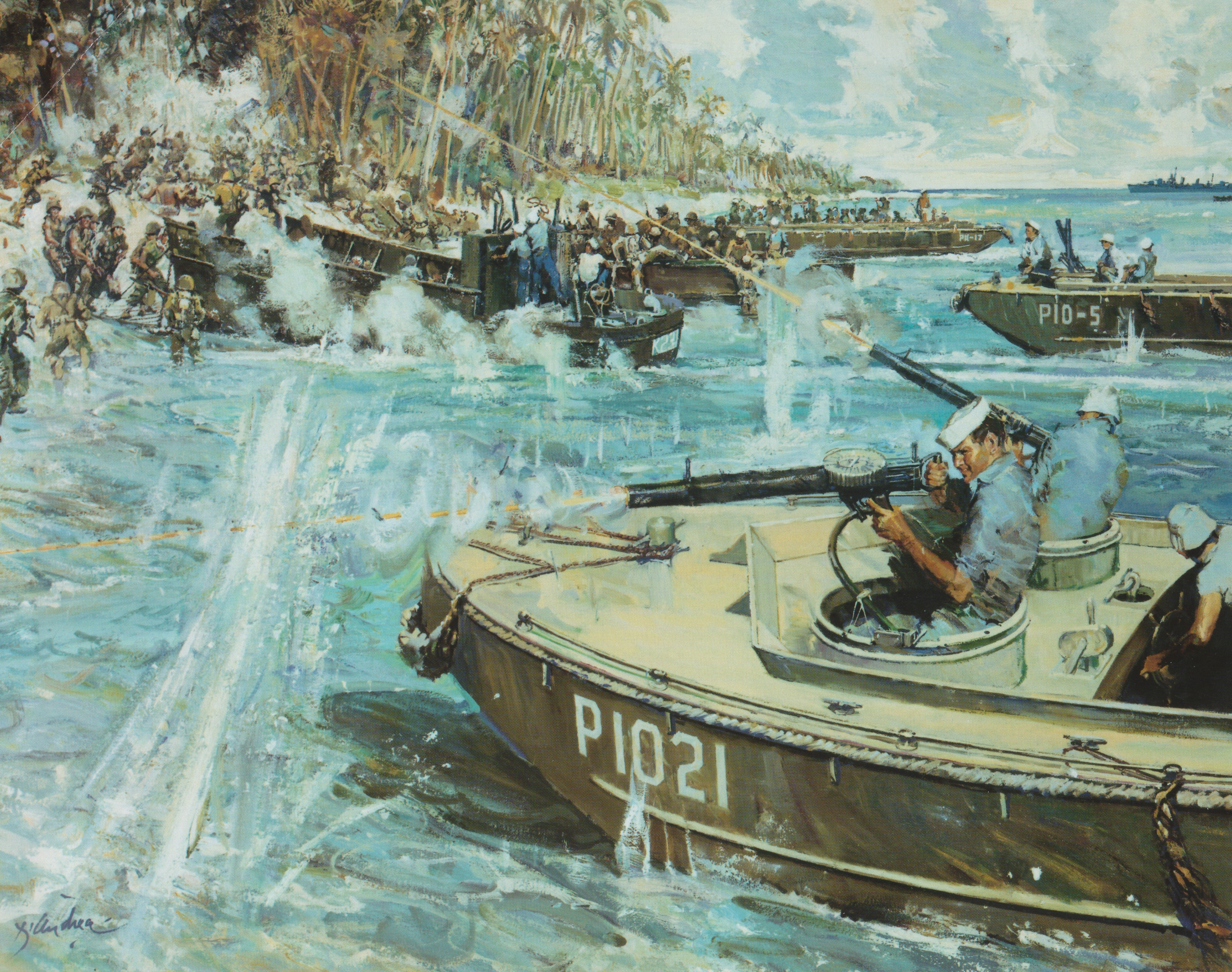
Douglas A. Munro Covers the Withdrawal of the 7th Marines at Guadalcanal (1989) by Bernard D'Andrea.

"Did they get off?"
— Douglas Albert Munro, United States Coast Guardsman and Medal of Honor recipient (27 September 1942), to his friend Raymond Evans after using his Higgins boat to direct fire away from evacuating American troops

"I bow to thee, Mother."
("Vande Mataram.")
— Matangini Hazra, Indian revolutionary (29 September 1942), repeatedly chanting words from protest song while being shot by British Indian police at the age of 72

"Look after Agnes."
— George M. Cohan, American entertainer (5 November 1942), referring to his wife

"I have no need of your Goddamned sympathy – I want to be entertained by some of your grosser reminiscences."
— Alexander Woollcott, American critic and radio personality (23 January 1943)

"How can we expect righteousness to prevail when there is hardly anyone willing to give himself up individually to a righteous cause... It is such a splendid sunny day, and I have to go. But how many have to die on the battlefield in these days, how many young, promising lives. What does my death matter if by our acts thousands are warned and alerted. Among the student body there will certainly be a revolt."
— Sophie Scholl, member of White Rose anti-Nazi resistance movement, sister of Hans Scholl (22 February 1943), before she was taken for beheading by guillotine

"Long live freedom!"
("Es lebe die Freiheit!")
— Hans Scholl, co-founder of White Rose resistance movement (22 February 1943), a moment before he was beheaded by guillotine

"Yes."
— Alexander Schmorell, Russian-German student and member of the White Rose resistance movement (13 July 1943), on being asked if his name was Alexander Schmorell prior to his execution via guillotine

"What a life!"
— Radclyffe Hall, English poet and author (7 October 1943)

"Boys, I sure hate to leave you like this."
— William D. Hawkins, United States Marine Corps officer and Medal of Honor recipient (21 November 1943), mortally wounded at the Battle of Tarawa

"I've a 3-month-old baby at home. I certainly would like to see my baby."
— Kay Kopl Vesole, United States Navy officer (December 1943), mortally wounded while rescuing survivors from the sinking of SS John Bascom

"Reorganise the post, I will give covering fire."
("Post reorganise karo, mein covering fire doonga.")
— Abdul Hafiz VC, Indian recipient of the Victoria Cross (6 April 1944), mortally wounded at the Battle of Imphal

"No."
— George Stinney, African-American child and youngest American with an exact age executed by the United States (16 June 1944), on whether he had any final words before his wrongful execution via electric chair. 14-year-old Stinney was tried and sentenced to death by Judge Philip H. Stoll in under three hours on 14 April after an all-white jury declared him guilty for double murder after only ten minutes of deliberation.

"Don't give them a damned inch!"
— William J. O'Brien, United States Army officer and Medal of Honor recipient (7 July 1944), during Banzai charge on his battalion at the Battle of Saipan

"I'm going to hold these guys off as long as I can. I'll see you later."
— Ben L. Salomon, United States Army dental officer and Medal of Honor recipient (7 July 1944), preparing to cover evacuation of wounded from aid station with M1917 Browning machine gun during the Battle of Saipan

"If it doesn't work this time, then please help me."
— Ludwig Beck, German general (20 July 1944), trying unsuccessfully to shoot himself after the failure of the 20 July plot. A soldier then shot and killed him.

"Long live our sacred Germany!"
("Es lebe das heilige Deutschland!")
— Claus von Stauffenberg, German army officer (21 July 1944), before being executed by the Nazis for his involvement in the failed 20 July plot

"If I die, do not blame anyone because I am starving. I was making a living by playing piano in a movie theater. Now I can not find this job either. You bury me as a Muslim."
("Ben ölürsem, kimseyi suçlamayın; zira açlıktan ölüyorum. Bir sinemada piyano çalarak hayatımı kazanıyordum. Şimdi bu işi de bulamıyorum. Beni bir Müslüman olarak defnedersiniz.")
— Şehzade Ahmed Nuri, Ottoman prince (7 August 1944), note found in his pocket after he starved to death in a French public park

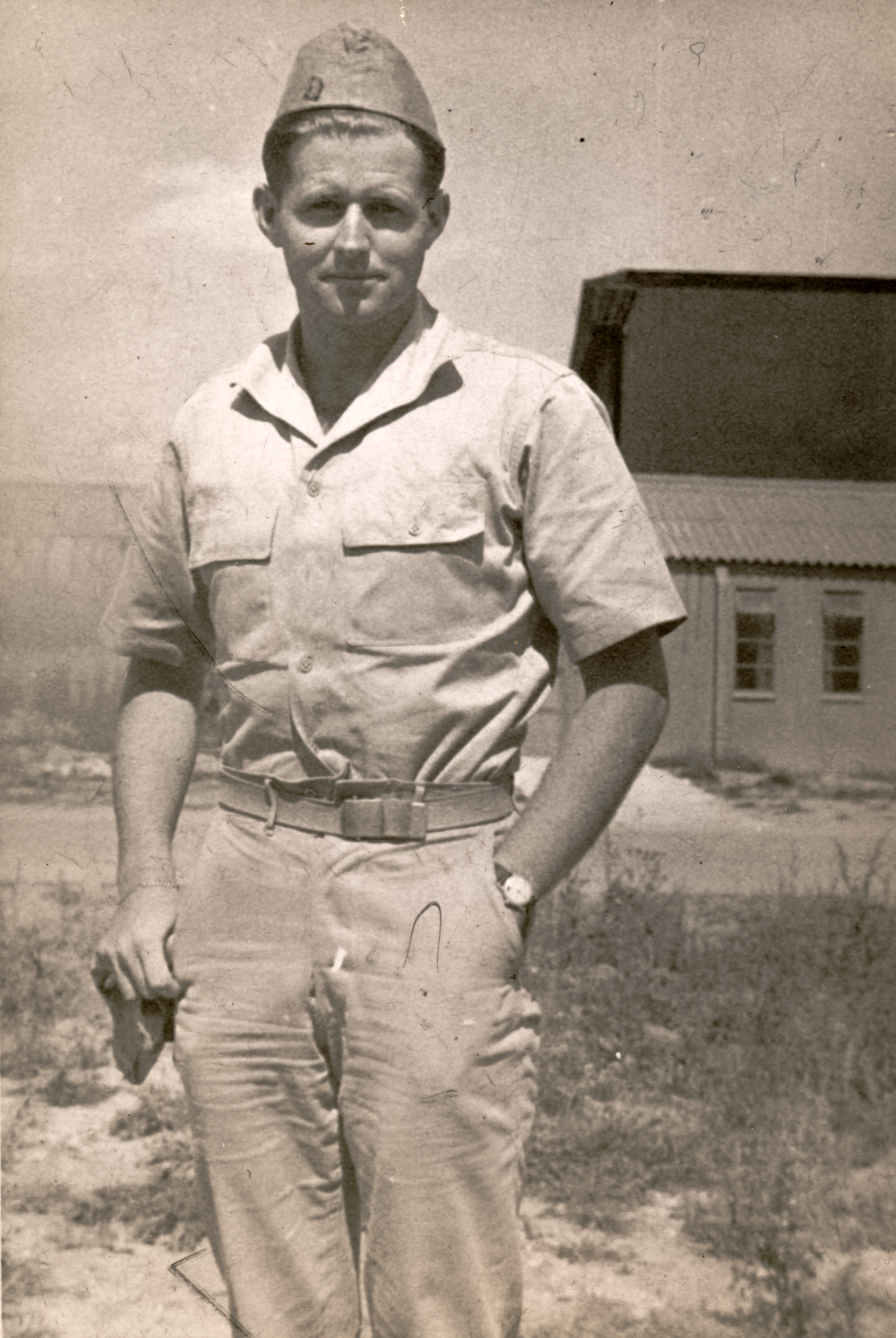
Last known photo of Joseph P. Kennedy Jr., taken on the day of his death.

"Spade Flush."
— Joseph P. Kennedy Jr., United States Navy lieutenant (12 August 1944), radioing code phrase prior to explosion of plane on Operation Aphrodite mission

"I'm going down..."
— Alexandru Șerbănescu, Second World War Romanian fighter ace (18 August 1944), crashing after being shot down

"Put an end, Lord, to all our sufferings." (Note: Also reported as "Mach End', o Herr, mach' Ende mit aller unserer Not.")
("Setzen Sie ein Ende, o Gott, für alle unsere Leiden.")
— Elisabeth von Thadden, German progressive educator and resistance fighter (8 September 1944), before her execution by the Nazi regime

"I'm staying here. In any case, I can swim to Australia if I have to."
— Winston Ide, Australian rugby union player (12 September 1944), responding to requests to save himself during the sinking of the SS Rakuyo Maru

"Liberté!"
— Noor Inayat Khan, GC, British spy in the Special Operations Executive (13 September 1944), prior to execution by firing squad at Dachau concentration camp

"I'm on fire." (Note: Also reported as "It's on fire.")
— Walter Nowotny, Second World War German fighter ace (8 November 1944), crashing due to engine failure after combat with United States Army Air Force planes

"To Harald, may God forgive you and forgive me too but I prefer to take my life away and our baby's before I bring him with shame or killing him, Lupe."
— Lupe Vélez, Mexican actress, dancer and singer (14 December 1944), in her suicide note, addressed to actor Harald Ramond. Vélez was pregnant with Ramond's child at the time.

"What's the matter Miller, do you want to live forever?"
— Norman F. Baesall, U.S. Army Air Force lieutenant colonel (15 December 1944), in response to Glenn Miller asking where the parachutes were prior to flight from RAF Twinwood Farm to Paris. The plane disappeared while flying over the English Channel.

"Okay, Father. I'll pray that you don't follow me too soon."
— Eddie Slovik, American soldier (31 January 1945), to the attending military chaplain, before his execution for desertion.

"C'mon you guys! Let's get these guns off the beach."
— John Basilone, United States Marine Corps Gunnery Sergeant and Medal of Honor recipient (19 February 1945), prior to being killed at the Battle of Iwo Jima

"They killed me!"
— Harlon Block, United States Marine Corps corporal (1 March 1945), mortally wounded at the Battle of Iwo Jima

"What I done, I did in self-defense, or I would have been killed myself. Where I was I could not overcome it. God has forgiven me. I have nothing against anyone. I picked cotton for Mr. Pritchett, and he has been good to me. I am ready to go. I am one in the number. I am ready to meet my God. I have a very strong conscience."
— Lena Baker, African American maid (5 March 1945), prior to execution by electrocution for the murder of her employer. She received a full and unconditional pardon in 2005.

"Doc, the New York Giants lost a mighty good end today."
— Jack Lummus, professional football player, United States Marine Corps officer and Medal of Honor recipient (8 March 1945), after losing his legs to a land mine at the Battle of Iwo Jima

"I die, because it was ordered. I had always wanted only the best for Germany."
— Friedrich Fromm, German general (12 March 1945), prior to being executed as part of the post-conspiracy purge after the failure of the 20 July plot

"I have a terrific headache." (Note: Also reported as, "We have fifteen minutes more to work" by Elizabeth Shoumatoff.)
— Franklin D. Roosevelt, president of the United States (12 April 1945), before dying of intracerebral hemorrhage

"I shoot better!"
("Ik schiet beter!")
— Hannie Schaft, Dutch Resistance Fighter (17 April 1945), mocking her two executioners after the first shot grazed off her.

"Are you all right?"
— Ernie Pyle, American war correspondent (18 April 1945), to Lt. Col. Joseph B. Coolidge before being fatally shot on Iejima during the Battle of Okinawa

"Shoot me in the chest!" (Note: Last words of Mussolini as claimed by Aldo Lampredi, who was an eyewitness to his death. Also reported as, "But...but...Mr. Colonel." Walter Audisio, the person generally accepted to have killed Mussolini, claimed that Mussolini said nothing immediately prior to or during the execution.)
("Sparami nel petto!")
— Benito Mussolini, Italian fascist statesman (28 April 1945), facing a partisan leader

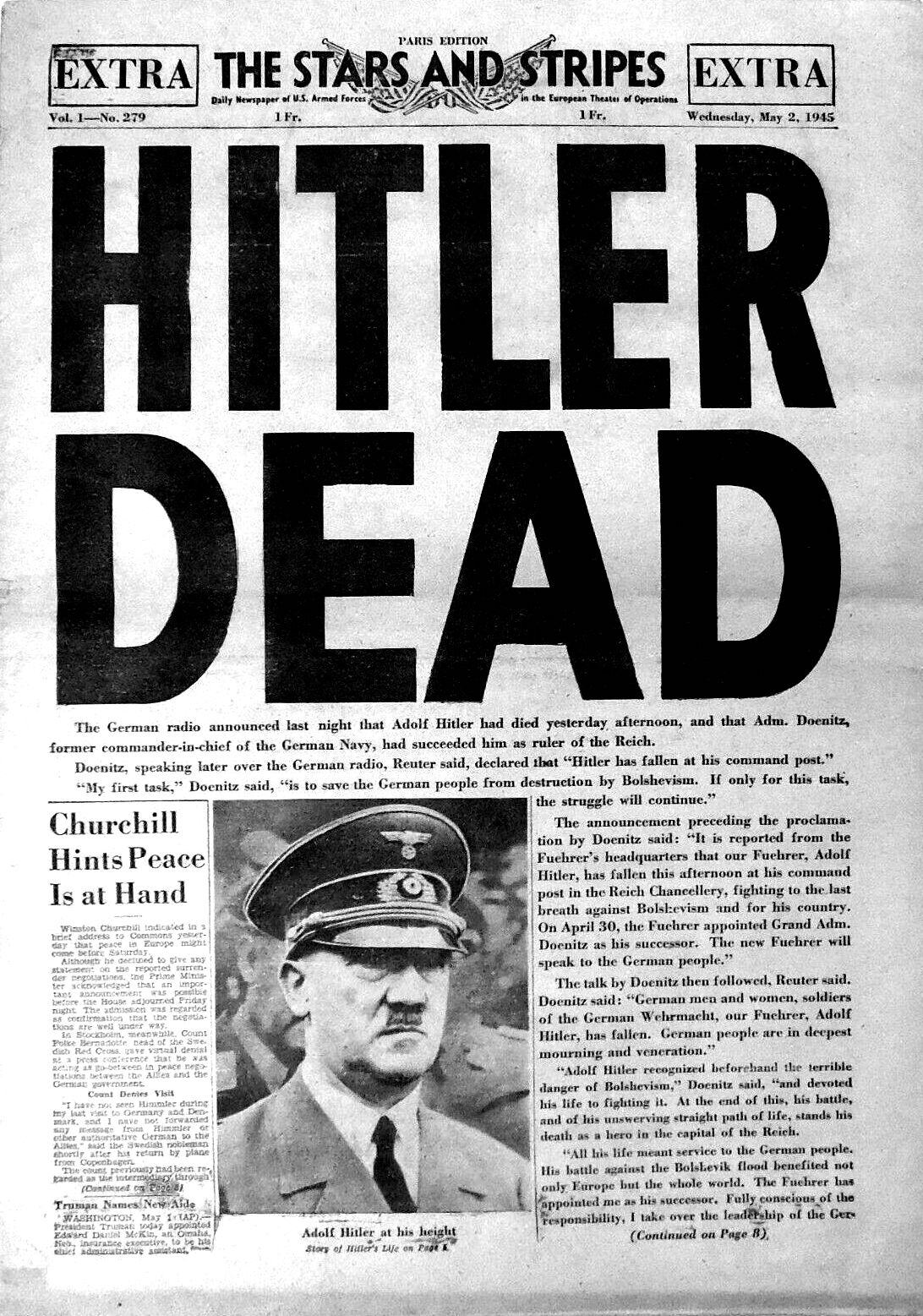
Adolf Hitler committed suicide to avoid being captured after losing World War II.

"Above all, I charge the leadership of the nation and their followers with the strict observance of the racial laws and with merciless resistance against the universal poisoners of all peoples, international Jewry."
("Vor allem verpflichte ich die Führung der Nation und die Gefolgschaft zur peinlichen Einhaltung der Rassegesetze und zum unbarmherzigen Widerstand gegen den Weltvergifter aller Völker, das internationale Judentum.")
— Adolf Hitler, German Nazi statesman (30 April 1945), closing his last will before committing joint suicide with his wife Eva

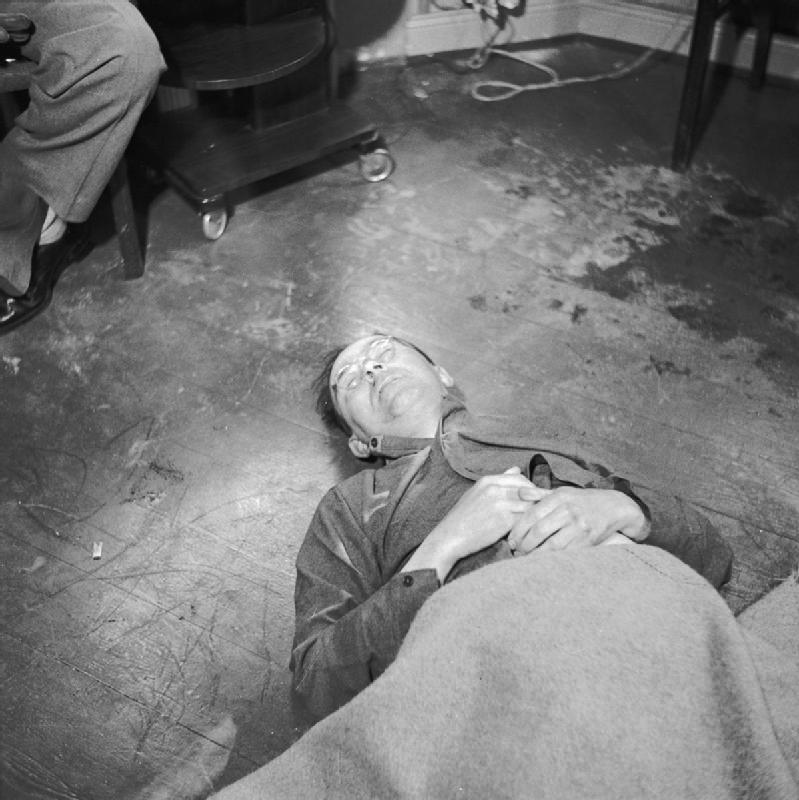
Himmler's corpse after his suicide by cyanide poisoning, May 1945

"I am Heinrich Himmler."
— Heinrich Himmler, German Nazi officer (23 May 1945), last words said during his suicide shortly after biting into a hidden potassium cyanide pill before collapsing dead onto the floor of the headquarters of the Second British Army in Lüneburg.

"I'm shot...it's over."
— Anton Webern, Austrian composer and conductor (15 September 1945), shot by U.S. Army soldier during the Allied occupation of Austria

"I am only sad that I have to leave with a full trunk." (Note: Also reported as, "The sad thing is that I leave with so much to say.")
— Béla Bartók, Hungarian composer (26 September 1945). He died with multiple works left unfinished.

"I'm convicted unfairly and I die innocent."
— Vidkun Quisling, Norwegian politician (24 October 1945), prior to execution by firing squad for murder and high treason

"No. (And supposing you were?)"
— Robert Benchley, American humorist (21 November 1945); words which he jotted beside the title of an essay which he was reading, "Am I Thinking?"

"All planes close up tight ... will have to ditch unless landfall ... when the first plane drops to ten gallons, we all go down together."
— Charles Carroll Taylor, United States Naval Reserve lieutenant (5 December 1945), last transmission before Flight 19 disappeared over Bermuda Triangle

"Quick." (Note: Glossed idiomatically as "Make it quick" or "Get it over with.")
("Schnell.")
— Irma Grese, SS concentration camp guard (13 December 1945), prior to her execution by hanging

"Whatever you would like me to have."
— Maurice Baring, English man of letters (14 December 1945), when asked what he wanted for lunch

"Oh Pierrepoint."
— John Amery, British fascist (19 December 1945); to his executioner, Albert Pierrepoint, prior to hanging for high treason

"This is a hell of a way to die."
— George S. Patton, United States Army general (21 December 1945), paralyzed from neck down after automobile collision

"Shakespeare, I come."
— Theodore Dreiser, American novelist (28 December 1945)

"What is the answer? In that case, what is the question?"
— Gertrude Stein, American writer (27 July 1946), addressing her life partner Alice B. Toklas

"Go away. I'm all right." (Note: Also reported as, "God damn you all; I told you so.")
— H. G. Wells, English author and futurist (13 August 1946)

"You might make that a double."
— Neville Heath, English murderer (16 October 1946), when he was offered a drink prior to his execution by hanging

"God protect Germany. May I say something else? My last wish is that Germany realize its entity and that an understanding be reached between the East and the West. I wish peace to the world." (Note: Also reported as, "God protect Germany. God have mercy on my soul. My final wish is that Germany should recover her unity and that, for the sake of peace, there should be understanding between East and West. I wish peace to the world.")
— Joachim von Ribbentrop, German politician, Minister of Foreign Affairs of Nazi Germany (16 October 1946), prior to his execution by hanging for war crimes and crimes against humanity (Nuremberg executions)

"Deutschland über alles!" (Note: Also reported as, "I call on God Almighty to have mercy on the German people. More than 2 million German soldiers went to their death for the fatherland before me. I follow now my sons – all for Germany.")
— Wilhelm Keitel, German field marshal (16 October 1946), during his execution by hanging for war crimes and crimes against humanity (Nuremberg executions)

"I have loved my German people and my fatherland with a warm heart. I have done my duty by the laws of my people and I am sorry my people were led this time by men who were not soldiers and that crimes were committed of which I had no knowledge. Germany, good luck."
— Ernst Kaltenbrunner, Austrian SS official, major perpetrator of The Holocaust (16 October 1946), prior to his execution by hanging for war crimes and crimes against humanity (Nuremberg executions)

"No."
— Alfred Rosenberg, Baltic German Nazi theorist and ideologue (16 October 1946), when asked if he had anything to say prior to his execution by hanging for war crimes and crimes against humanity (Nuremberg executions)

"I am thankful for the kind of treatment during my captivity and I ask God to accept me with mercy."
— Hans Frank, German politician and lawyer (16 October 1946), prior to his execution by hanging for war crimes and crimes against humanity (Nuremberg executions)

"Long live eternal Germany."
— Wilhelm Frick, German politician of the Nazi Party (16 October 1946), prior to his execution by hanging for war crimes and crimes against humanity (Nuremberg executions)

"Heil Hitler, this is my Purim Fest in 1946! I am going to God. The Bolsheviks will hang you one day!" (Note: Also reported as, "Heil Hitler!" (when asked his name) "You know my name well. Julius Streicher. Now it goes to God. Purim Fest 1946. The Bolsheviks will hang you one day. Adele, my dear wife.")
("Heil Hitler! Dies ist mein Purimfest 1946. Ich gehe zu Gott. Die Bolschewisten werden eines Tages Euch auch hängen!")
— Julius Streicher, Nazi politician, founder and publisher of Der Stürmer (16 October 1946), prior to his execution by hanging for crimes against humanity (Nuremberg executions)

"I am dying innocent. The sentence is wrong. God protect Germany and make Germany great again. Long live Germany! God protect my family."
— Fritz Sauckel, German Nazi politician (16 October 1946), prior to his execution by hanging for war crimes and crimes against humanity (Nuremberg executions)

"My greetings to you, my Germany."
— Alfred Jodl, German Generaloberst (16 October 1946), prior to his execution by hanging for war crimes and crimes against humanity (Nuremberg executions)

"I hope that this execution is the last act of the tragedy of the Second World War and that the lesson taken from this world war will be that peace and understanding should exist between peoples. I believe in Germany."
— Arthur Seyss-Inquart, Austrian Nazi politician, Reichskommissar of the occupied Netherlands (16 October 1946), prior to his execution by hanging for war crimes and crimes against humanity (Nuremberg executions)

"You can keep the things of bronze and stone and give me one man to remember me just once a year."
— Damon Runyon, American newspaperman and short-story writer (10 December 1946)

"God damn the whole fuckin' world and everyone in it but you, Carlotta." (Note: Also reported as, "I'm looking for a loophole" or "I'm looking for loopholes" (while paging through a Bible).)
— W. C. Fields, American entertainer (25 December 1946), addressing his mistress, Carlotta Monti

"Well, it can't be helped."
— George Atcheson Jr., American diplomat (17 August 1947), aboard plane going down in Pacific Ocean near Hawaii

"You ass-face!"
("¡Cara de poto!")
— Vicente Huidobro, Chilean poet (2 January 1948); after regaining consciousness, he confessed to his loved ones that he was afraid and made his friend Henriette Petit cry when he stared at her and shouted this expression

"The object is directly ahead of and above me now, moving at about half my speed... It appears to be a metallic object or possibly reflection of Sun from a metallic object, and it is of tremendous size... I'm still climbing... I'm trying to close in for a better look."
— Thomas F. Mantell, Kentucky Air National Guard captain (7 January 1948), during fatal pursuit of UFO (Note: Mantell was also reported to have said, "My God, I see people in this thing!")

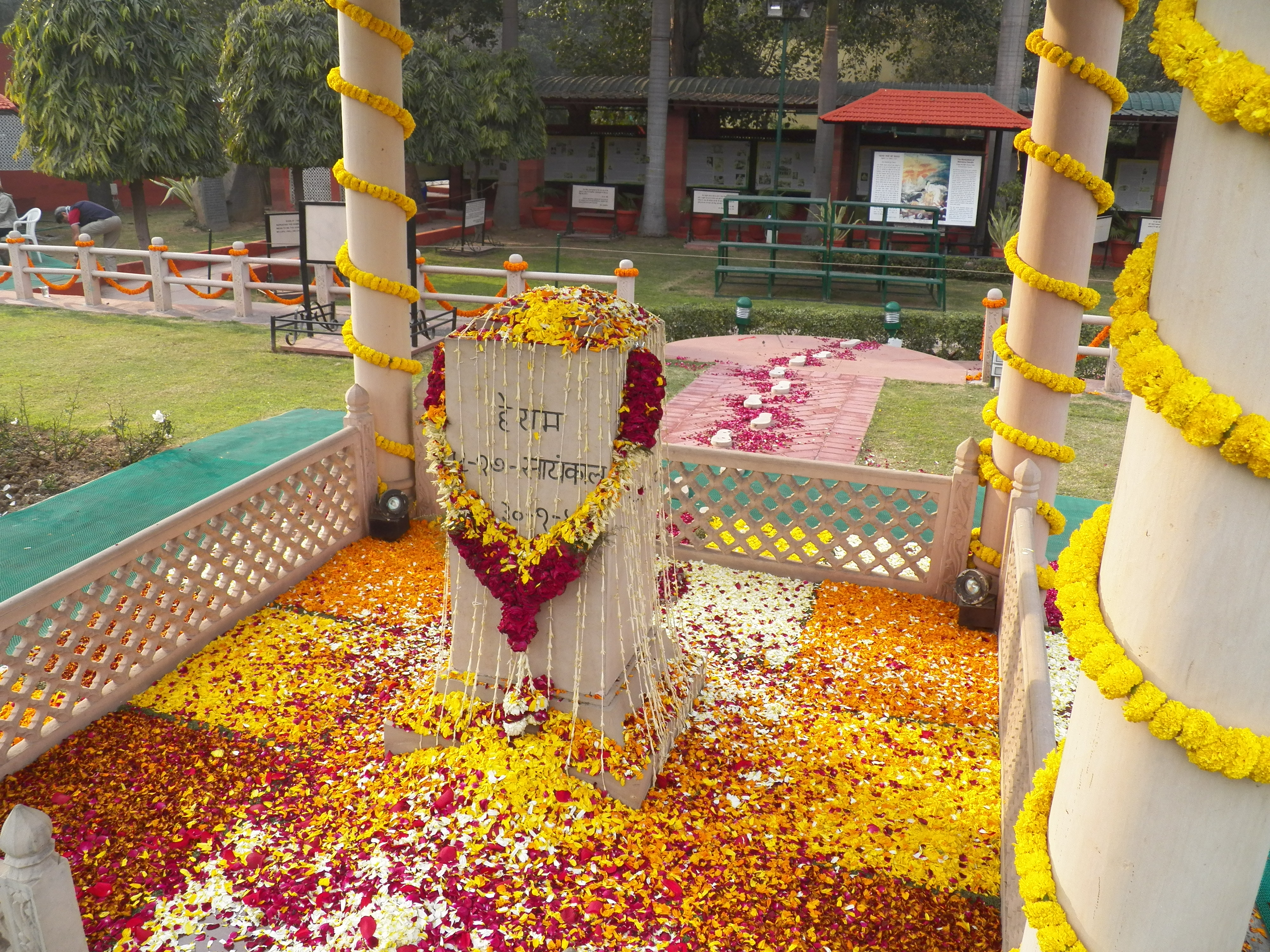
Memorial at the location of Gandhi's murder.

"Oh God!" (Note: Also reported as, "I am late by ten minutes. I hate being late. I like to be at the prayer punctually at the stroke of five.")
("हे राम!")
— Mahatma Gandhi, Indian revolutionary and pacifist (30 January 1948), shortly after being shot by Hindu nationalist Nathuram Godse

"The man was by the door. I got his identity card and name. I do not know if it is right. He shot me in the legs with three shots. The pocket book is in my inside pocket."
— Nathanael Edgar, British police officer (13 February 1948), describing the circumstances of his being mortally wounded in the line of duty

"To the General Secretary of the Arab League in Cairo: I lay full blame on your shoulders for leaving my soldiers, in the zenith of victory, without aid or weaponry. Abd al-Qadir al-Husayni."
("السيد الأمين العام لجامعة الدول العربية، القاهرة: اني احملكم المسؤولية بعد ان تركتم جنودي في اوج انتصاراتهم بدون عون او سلاح. عبدالقادر الحسيني")
— Abd al-Qadir al-Husayni, Palestinian leader and fighter (8 April 1948), in a note to Abdul Rahman Hassan Azzam written shortly before his death during the Battle of Qastal

"I'm going over the valley."
— Babe Ruth, American baseball player (16 August 1948)

"No, I am not."
— Muhammad Ali Jinnah, founder and 1st Governor-General of Pakistan (11 September 1948), on being told by his doctor, Lieutenant Colonel Ilahi Bakhsh, that he was going to live. He died thirty minutes later.

"I'll need it."
— Folke Bernadotte, Swedish nobleman and diplomat (17 September 1948), on being wished good luck by a journalist prior to his assassination

"Frenzy hath seized thy dearest son, / Who from thy shores in glory came / The first in valor and in fame; / Thy deeds that he hath done / Seem hostile all to hostile eyes.... / Better to die, and sleep / The never waking sleep, than linger on, / And dare to live, when the soul's life is gone."
— James Forrestal, United States Secretary of Defense (22 May 1949); his suicide note, a quotation from the play Ajax by Sophocles

"I would give anything just to have written this."
— Richard Strauss, German composer and conductor (8 September 1949), holding a copy of Mozart's Clarinet Concerto

"Doctor, if I put this here guitar down now, I ain't never gonna wake up."
— Lead Belly, American folk and blues singer, musician and songwriter (6 December 1949)

== 1950–1959 ==
"Mama!"
("Mamasha!")
— Vaslav Nijinsky, Polish ballet dancer and choreographer (8 April 1950)

"I'm falling, I'm falling, I have lost this fight but I leave with honour. I love this country, I love this nation, strive for its wellbeing. I depart without rancour towards you. I wish you that, I wish you that..."
("Padám, padám, tento boj jsem prohrála, odcházím čestně. Miluji tuto zem, miluji tento lid, budujte mu blahobyt. Odcházím bez nenávisti k vám. Přeji vám to, přeji vám to...")
— Milada Horáková, Czech politician (27 June 1950), prior to execution by hanging on fabricated charges of conspiracy and treason

"No, I'll never make it. I'm going back and get that bastard." (Note: Also reported as, "I'll get those dirty bastards!")
— Louis J. Sebille, United States Air Force fighter pilot and Medal of Honor recipient (5 August 1950), when urged by one of his wingmen to head for an emergency landing strip after being wounded during the Battle of Pusan Perimeter in the Korean War. Sebille then deliberately crashed into a North Korean convoy.

"The Gooks will never drive the Argylls off this hill."
— Kenneth Muir VC, British Army officer (23 September 1950), mortally wounded by automatic weapon fire during Battle of Hill 282 in the Korean War

"This is it! I'm going. I'm going."
— Al Jolson, American singer and actor (23 October 1950)

"Sister, you're trying to keep me alive as an old curiosity, but I'm done, I'm finished, I'm going to die."
— George Bernard Shaw, Irish playwright and critic (2 November 1950), to his nurse

"Tell Daisy that I love her."
— Jesse L. Brown, United States Naval Aviator (4 December 1950), mentioning his wife while trapped and dying in cockpit after being shot down during the Battle of Chosin Reservoir in the Korean War. Thomas J. Hudner Jr. received the Medal of Honor for his unsuccessful attempt to rescue Brown.

"Get back ... I'll cover you."
— John U. D. Page, United States Army officer and Medal of Honor recipient (11 December 1950), prior to being killed in action during the Battle of Chosin Reservoir in the Korean War

"Say goodbye to my wife and kids."
— Ray Wetmore, American World War II flying ace (14 February 1951), prior to fatal crash of F-86 Sabre

"It is well."
("C'est bien.")
— André Gide, French author (19 February 1951)

"So long."
— Martha Beck, American serial killer (8 March 1951), whispering while being placed in the electric chair

"Tell them I've had a wonderful life."
— Ludwig Wittgenstein, Austrian philosopher (29 April 1951), upon being told that his close friends would come to visit him the next day

"As you see, I am crying too, not tears of pain but tears of joy, because I'll be with my God in a short time."
— Emil Kapaun, United States Army Roman Catholic chaplain and Medal of Honor recipient (23 May 1951), dying in prisoner of war camp during the Korean War

"Harmony."
— Arnold Schoenberg, Austrian-American composer (13 July 1951)

"I've got your back."
— Anthony T. Kahoʻohanohano, United States Army soldier and Medal of Honor recipient (1 September 1951), prior to being killed in action in the Korean War

"You go. I'll cover you."
— Joseph Vittori, United States Marine and Medal of Honor recipient (16 September 1951), prior to being killed in action at the Battle of the Punchbowl in the Korean War

"I've got what I deserved."
("Mám, co jsem si zasloužil.")
— Rudolf Slánský, Czech communist politician (3 December 1952), prior to execution by hanging following charges of conspiracy and high treason at a show trial

"If they are not, blame me."
— Owen Roberts, British Royal Air Force officer and aviator (10 April 1953), when his flight attendant questioned the safety of the Lockheed Lodestar prior to the aircraft crashing during takeoff

"This must be an awful bore for you."
– Hilaire Belloc, French-English author and Member of Parliament (16 July 1953), after being given a blanket and propped up with a pillow by his daughter and grandson

"Life is still full of joy. Thumbs up for joy and adventure."
— Maude Adams, American actress known for playing Peter Pan (17 July 1953)

"Wouldn't it be lovely if I could just go to sleep and not wake up again?"
— Kathleen Ferrier, English contralto singer (8 October 1953), to a nurse while dying of breast cancer

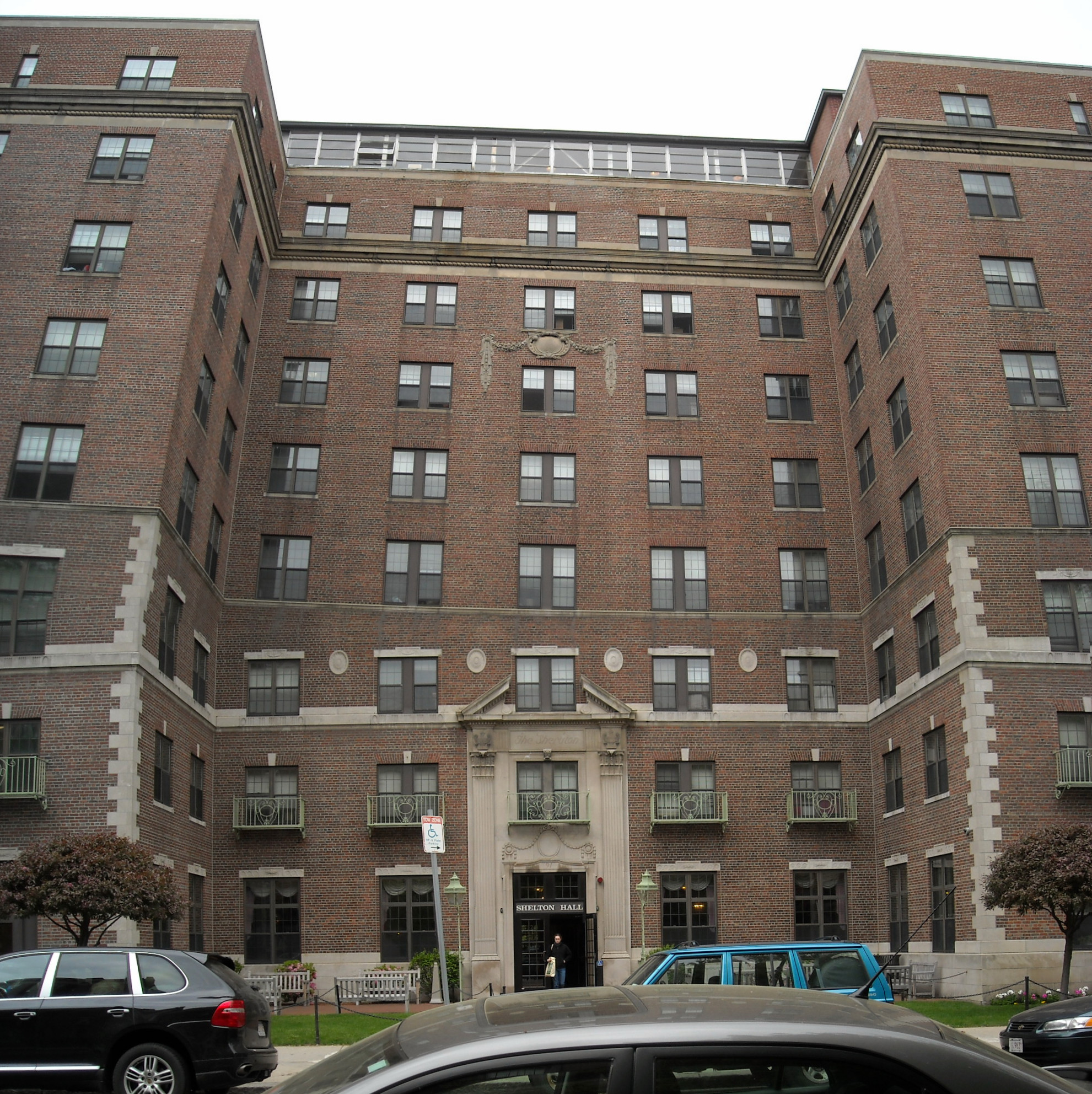
Kilachand Hall at Boston University, formerly the Sheraton Hotel where Eugene O'Neill died.

"I knew it! I knew it! Born in a hotel room and, goddamn it, dying in a hotel room."
— Eugene O'Neill, American playwright (27 November 1953), to his wife Carlotta Monterey

"I'll show you that it won't shoot."
— Johnny Ace, American rhythm-and-blues singer and musician (25 December 1954), playing with a .32 caliber revolver

"Doctor, do you think it could have been the sausage?"
("Docteur, pensez-vous que cela aurait pu être la saucisse?")
— Paul Claudel, French writer and diplomat (23 February 1955)

"I want to go when I want. It is tasteless to prolong life artificially. I have done my share, it is time to go. I will do it elegantly."
— Albert Einstein, German physicist (18 April 1955), declining surgery the day before his death (Note: His true last words are unknown, as he spoke them in German to the attending English nurses, who could not understand him. These are therefore his last known words.)

"Life is wonderful. I am wonderful."
— Mary McLeod Bethune, American educator, stateswoman and civil rights activist (18 May 1955)

"That guy's gotta stop... He'll see us." (Note: Also reported as, "My fun days are over.")
— James Dean, American actor (30 September 1955), to his friend Rolf Wütherich, moments before the car crash

"I am happy, because I am going to Heaven."
— Alexandrina of Balazar (born Alexandrina Maria da Costa), Portuguese Roman Catholic mystic, victim soul and blessed (13 October 1955)

"It's tasty."
("おいしい.")
– Sadako Sasaki, Japanese 12-year-old victim of the United States' atomic bombings of Hiroshima and Nagasaki known for folding a thousand paper cranes (25 October 1955), to her family after tasting her final meal, tea on rice.

"I am wiling to be a junior. I am glad to sit in the back row, for I had rather be a servant in the house of the Lord than to sit in the seats of the mighty."
— Alben W. Barkley, vice-president of the United States (30 April 1956), alluding to Psalms 84:10 just before dying of a heart attack while giving keynote address at the 1956 Washington and Lee Mock Convention

"No. Thanks for everything."
— Max Beerbohm, English essayist, parodist and caricaturist (20 May 1956), on being asked by his wife if he had had a good sleep

"Too late for fruit, too soon for flowers."
— Walter de la Mare, English author (22 June 1956), when asked if he wanted some fruit or flowers

"75-Hotel. I'm going into the water."
— Tom Gastall, American baseball player (20 September 1956), final radio transmission before crash of his ERCO Ercoupe into Chesapeake Bay

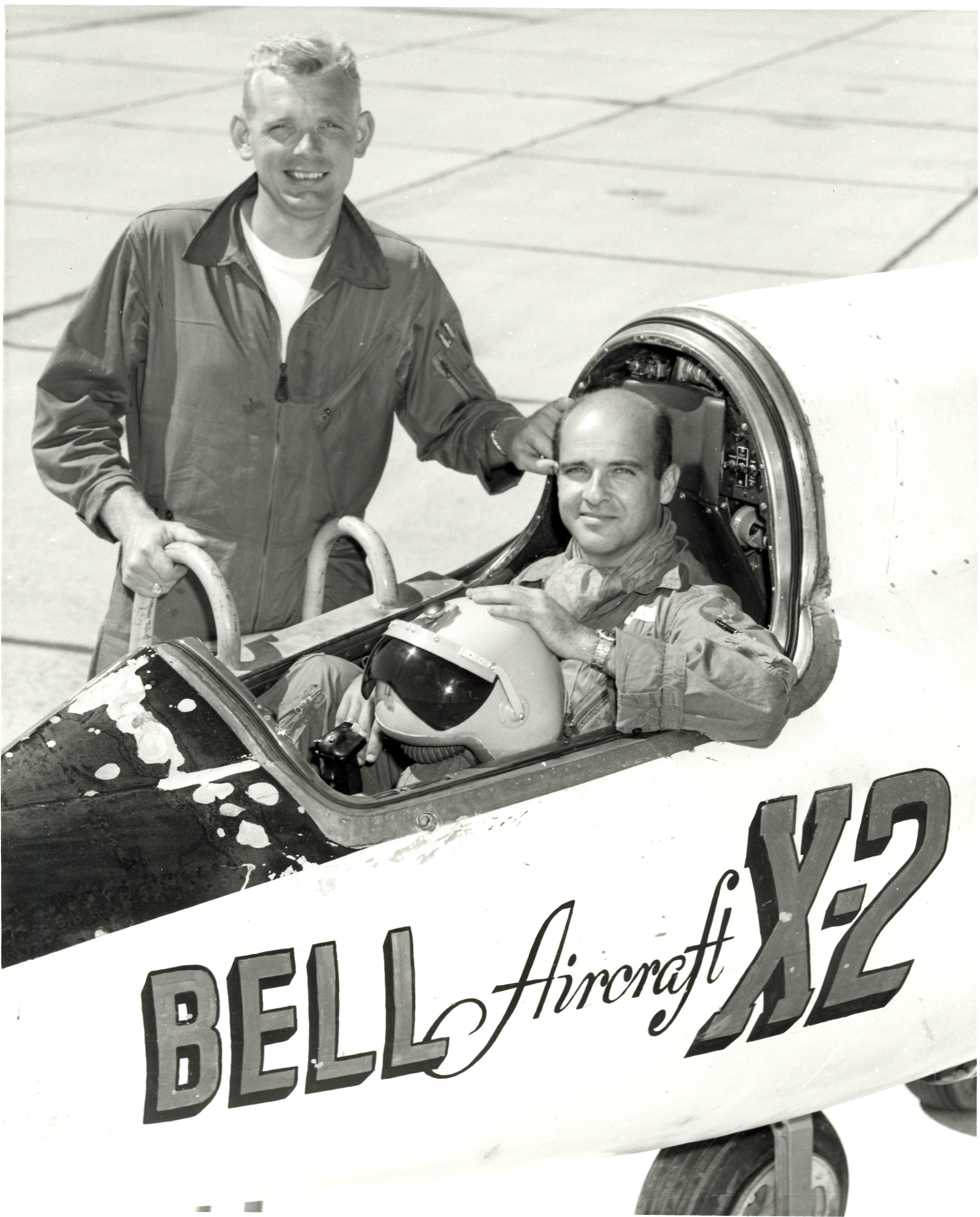
Test pilots Iven Carl Kincheloe Jr. and Milburn G. "Mel" Apt in 1956.

"There she goes!"
— Milburn G. Apt, American test pilot (27 September 1956), final radio transmission while losing control of Bell X-2

"Goodbye, kid. Hurry back."
— Humphrey Bogart, American actor (14 January 1957), to his wife Lauren as she left to collect their children, after which he entered a fatal coma

"Were [sic] a midair collision – midair collision, 10 How we are going in-uncontrollable – uncontrollable – we are...we've had it boy – poor jet too – told you we should take chutes – say goodbye to everybody."
— Archie R. Twitchell, American actor and aviator (31 January 1957), radio transmission after 1957 Pacoima mid-air collision

"Mind your business!"
— Wyndham Lewis, English writer and painter (7 March 1957), when asked on his deathbed about his bowels

"I can't admit it, Doc. Think of what that would do to my mother. She could not take it." (Note: Also reported as, "Thank you" (to Warden Harley O. Teets).)
— Burton Abbott, American convicted rapist and murderer (15 March 1957), to prison physician Dr. David Schmidt prior to execution by gas chamber

"The future is just old age and illness and pain... I must have peace and this is the only way."
— James Whale, English film and theater director and actor (29 May 1957), in his suicide note

"No.... Awfully jolly of you to suggest it, though."
— Ronald Knox, English Roman Catholic priest and writer (24 August 1957), when Lady Elton asked if he would like her to read from his translation of the New Testament

"I have laid my papers on a bed for my daughters. I have left the door open for the police to enter. I am going to shoot myself."
— Donald E. Montgomery, American economist (11 October 1957), calling police before committing suicide

"A quick haircut." (Note: Also reported as, "Haircut!")
— Albert Anastasia, Italian-American mobster (25 October 1957). He was assassinated while in the barber's chair at the Park Sheraton Hotel in Midtown Manhattan.

"Thank you father."
— Tony Morabito, founder of the San Francisco 49ers (27 October 1957), to the priest who gave him final absolution

"Nothing matters. Nothing matters."
— Louis B. Mayer, Canadian-American film producer, co-founder of Metro-Goldwyn-Mayer (29 October 1957)

"If this is death, then I am ready for it."
— Billy Whelan, Irish footballer (6 February 1958), during British European Airways Flight 609's third takeoff attempt prior to the Munich air disaster

"Edwards, Mayday seven seven two—bailing out."
— Iven Carl Kincheloe Jr., American test pilot (26 July 1958), final radio transmission prior to failed ejection from Lockheed F-104A

"Dear Hef, When you read this I shall be dead. I cannot go on living with myself and hurting those dear to me. What I do has nothing to do with you."
— Jack Cole, American cartoonist, creator of Plastic Man (13 August 1958), in his suicide note to Hugh Hefner

"Pray. Pray that this regrettable situation for the Church may end."
— Pope Pius XII, Italian Roman Catholic prelate and Pope (9 October 1958)

"I wish to announce the first plank in my campaign for reelection...we're going to have the floors in this goddamned hospital smoothed out!"
— James Michael Curley, American politician (12 November 1958), to his son while being wheeled out of surgery

"I think I'll be more comfortable."
— Lou Costello, American actor and comedian (3 March 1959), asking a nurse to change his position in bed

"Little Virgin: How much I love You! When are You coming for me?"
("Virgencita: ¡Cuánto te quiero! ¿Cuando me vendrás a buscar?")
— Montserrat Grases, Spanish Catholic laywoman and venerable (26 March 1959)

"I'm tired. I'm going back to bed."
— George Reeves, American actor (16 June 1959), prior to his apparent suicide

"Are you happy? I'm happy." (Note: Also reported as, "Is everybody happy? I want everybody to be happy. I know I'm happy.")
— Ethel Barrymore, American actress (18 June 1959), to her maid, Anna Albert

"These guys are supposed to be American? My ass!" (Note: Also reported as, "Ah, non ...")
— Boris Vian, French polymath (23 June 1959), while watching film adaptation of his novel I Spit on Your Graves

"I should have had the pickle."
— Preston Sturges, American playwright, screenwriter and film director (6 August 1959)

"Dying is easy. Comedy is difficult." (Note: Also reported as, "It is. But not as hard as farce", and as "Yes, it's tough, but it's not as tough as doing comedy", when told that dying must be hard.)
— Edmund Gwenn, English actor (6 September 1959)

"I love you, Betty...Betty."
— Mario Lanza, American operatic tenor and actor (7 October 1959), over the phone to his wife

"I've had a hell of a lot of fun and I've enjoyed every minute of it."
— Errol Flynn, Australian-born American actor (14 October 1959)

"Oh, God, here I go!"
— Max Baer, American boxer (21 November 1959), dying of a heart attack

"Beautifully done."
— Stanley Spencer, CBE RA, English painter (14 December 1959), to a nurse who had given him an injection

== 1960–1969 ==
"Someone else can arrange this."
— Constance Spry OBE, British educator, florist and author (3 January 1960), dying after slipping on stairs while arranging flowers

"He is safe! He is safe! Oh, joy!"
("È salvo! È salvo! Oh, gioia!")
— Leonard Warren, American operatic baritone (4 March 1960), performing in La Forza del Destino at the Metropolitan Opera before dying on stage

"There's that pain again! I can feel it in my arm and in my head."
— Roy Chapman Andrews, American explorer, adventurer and naturalist (11 March 1960), dying of a heart attack

"I done told you my last request ... a bulletproof vest."
— James W. Rodgers, American murderer (30 March 1960), facing a firing squad

"Why am I hemorrhaging?"
— Boris Pasternak, Russian author (30 May 1960), to his wife Zinaida

"I'm dizzy!"
— Knud Enemark Jensen, Danish cyclist (26 August 1960), shortly before collapsing to the pavement while competing in the 1960 Summer Olympics

"I am so bored." (Note: Also reported as, "God, I'm bored.")
— St John Philby, British Arabist and intelligence officer (30 September 1960)

"It's...It's coming out."
— Howard Glenn, Titans of New York offensive guard (9 October 1960), in locker room after fatal in-game injury

"During the election, they keep policies that would be unpopular with the public a secret, and then once they have won a majority in the election, they will... "
("選挙の際は、国民に評判の悪い政策は、全部伏せておいて、選挙で多数を占むると...")
— Inejirō Asanuma, then-chairman of the Japan Socialist Party (12 October 1960), criticizing the LDP, seconds before being stabbed with a wakizashi by 17-year-old Otoya Yamaguchi.

"Tillman, you know, God has been very good to me."
— Johnny Horton, American country, honky tonk and rockabilly musician (5 November 1960), to his manager Tillman Franks shortly before he was killed in a car accident.

"You're the only one I like."
— Percy Grainger, Australian-American composer (20 February 1961), to his wife Ella.

"Too much pain....Do something, please...to kill the pain."
— Valentin Bondarenko, Soviet cosmonaut (23 March 1961), fatally burned in altitude chamber fire

"I'm not afraid any more."
— George S. Kaufman, American playwright (2 June 1961)

"Get him, Les. Get him — he's got us!"
— Frederick George Hutchins, QPM, British police officer (3 June 1961), to Police Constable Leslie Charles England after being shot along with PC Charles Edward Cox, who survived

"Get after him!"
— Philip Pawsey, QPM, British police officer (3 June 1961), to PC Leslie Charles England after being shot by the same assailant as Sgt Hutchins and PC Cox

"Let's have a really good red wine tonight."
— Carl Jung (6 June 1961), Swiss psychiatrist and psychoanalyst

"Goodnight my kitten."
— Ernest Hemingway, American author (2 July 1961), before committing suicide with a shotgun

"Remember, Honey, don't forget what I told you. Put in my coffin a deck of cards, a mashie niblick, and a pretty blonde."
— Chico Marx, American actor and comedian (11 October 1961), giving his wife Mary humorous instructions for his funeral

"God bless ... God damn."
— James Thurber, American humorist (2 November 1961)

"Yes, but not too many."
("Ja, maar niet te veel.")
— Gerrit Achterberg, Dutch poet (17 January 1962), to his companion, who had asked if she should bake some potatoes

"Tell Georgie I want to get in the movies one way or another."
— Lucky Luciano, Italian-American gangster (26 January 1962), after meeting with a producer about a proposed film based on his life

"I'm only going out for a few minutes. Besides, I'm wearing thermal underwear."
— Anthony Strollo, American gangster (8 April 1962), to his wife prior to his disappearance

"I hope that all of you will follow me." (Note: Last words more commonly reported as, "Long live Germany. Long live Argentina. Long live Austria. These are the three countries with which I have been most connected and which I will not forget. I greet my wife, my family and my friends. I am ready. We'll meet again soon, as is the fate of all men. I die believing in God.")
— Adolf Eichmann, German-Austrian SS-Obersturmbannführer (1 June 1962), mumbling prior to execution by hanging for war crimes

"You're not going to see anything."
— Joseph Roland Ernst, American convicted murderer, neo-Nazi, and the second-to-last person to be executed by the state of New Jersey (31 July 1962)

"Say goodbye to Pat, say goodbye to the president and say goodbye to yourself, because you're a nice guy... I'll see... I'll see." (Note: Also reported as, "Say goodbye to Pat, say goodbye to Jack and say goodbye to yourself, because you're a nice guy, Charlie" (referring to Lawford's Rat Pack nickname).)
— Marilyn Monroe, American actress (4 August 1962), over the phone to Peter Lawford, John F. Kennedy's brother-in-law

"I'm going to stop now, but I'm going to sharpen the ax before I put it up, dear."
— E. E. Cummings, American poet (3 September 1962), to his wife, who was worried it was too hot for him to be chopping wood; he then suffered a stroke

"Have a good trip!"
("Счастливого пути!")
— Pyotr Dolgov, Soviet Air Force colonel and balloonist (1 November 1962), to Yevgeni Nikolayevich Andreyev prior to jumping from a Volga balloon gondola at an altitude of 25,600 metres (84,000 ft). Dolgov was killed when his pressure suit depressurized; Andreyev successfully reached the ground.

"Yes."
— Ian James Campbell, American police officer (9 March 1963), just before being fatally shot, in response to his killer asking if he had heard of the Little Lindbergh Law

"An olive, with a pit..."
— Victor Feguer, American convicted murderer (15 March 1963), requesting his last meal prior to execution by hanging

"Why crying? This is a moment of joy, a moment of glory."
("Perché piangere? È un momento di gioia questo, un momento di gloria.")
— Pope John XXIII, Italian Roman Catholic prelate and Pope (3 June 1963), speaking to his secretary

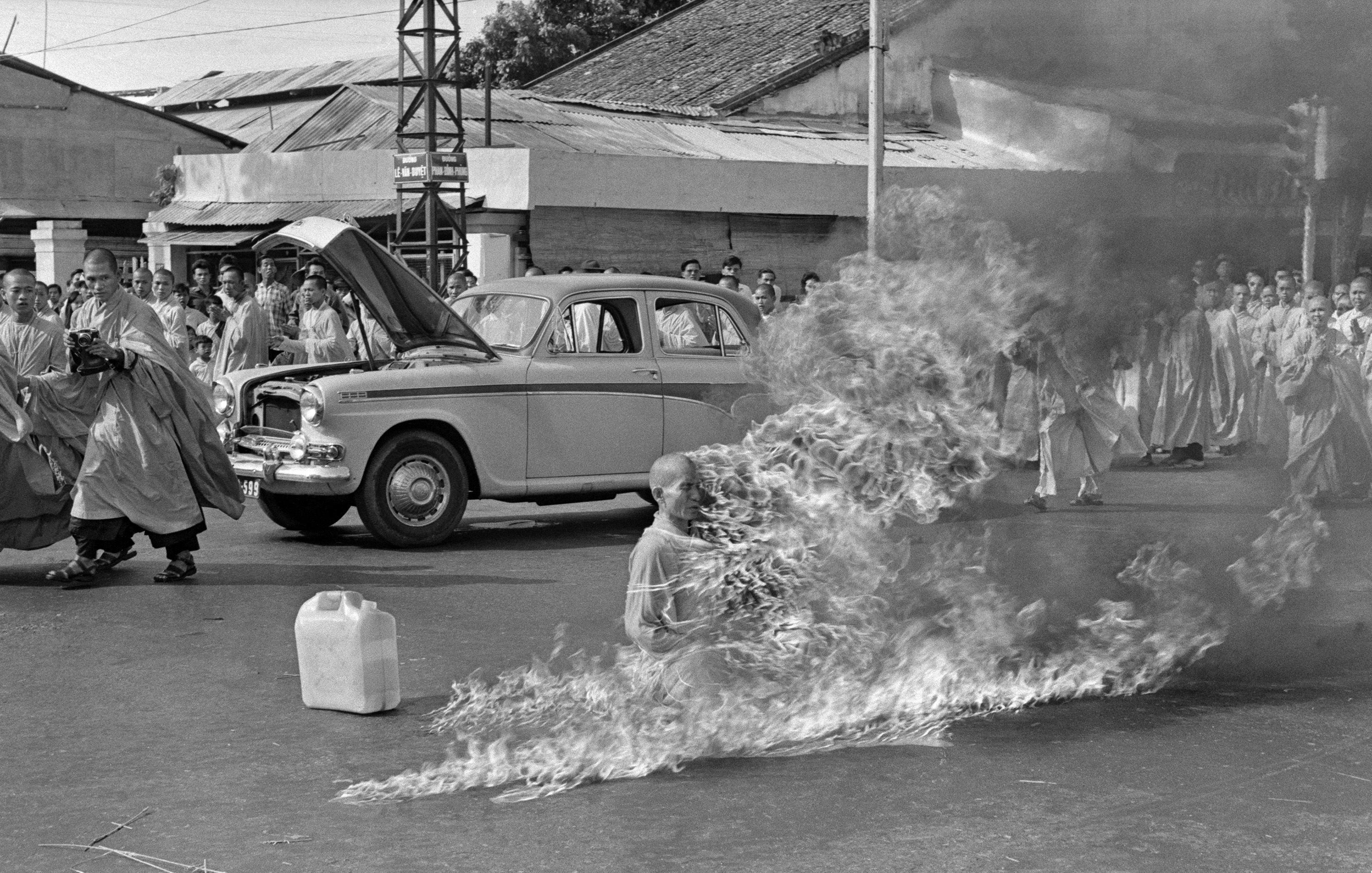
Thích Quảng Đức's self-immolation.(Photograph by Malcolm Browne)

"Nam mô A Di Đà Phật" (Vietnamese for 'homage to Amitābha') (Note: Nianfo devotional chant expressing reverence and refuge in Amitābha (A Di Đà Phật), one of the main Buddhas of Pure Land Buddhist teachings within Vietnam.)
— Thích Quảng Đức, Vietnamese Mahayana Buddhist monk (11 June 1963), prior to self-immolation

"Oh my God, oh my God! Where's my head, where's my head?"
— Stone Johnson, Kansas City Chiefs running back (8 September 1963), after suffering fractured vertebra in neck during kickoff return on 30 August 1963

"All the damn fool things you do in life you pay for." (Note: Also reported as, "Every damn thing you do in this life, you have to pay for" and as "I can die now, I've lived twice.")
— Édith Piaf, French singer-songwriter (10 October 1963), to her sister

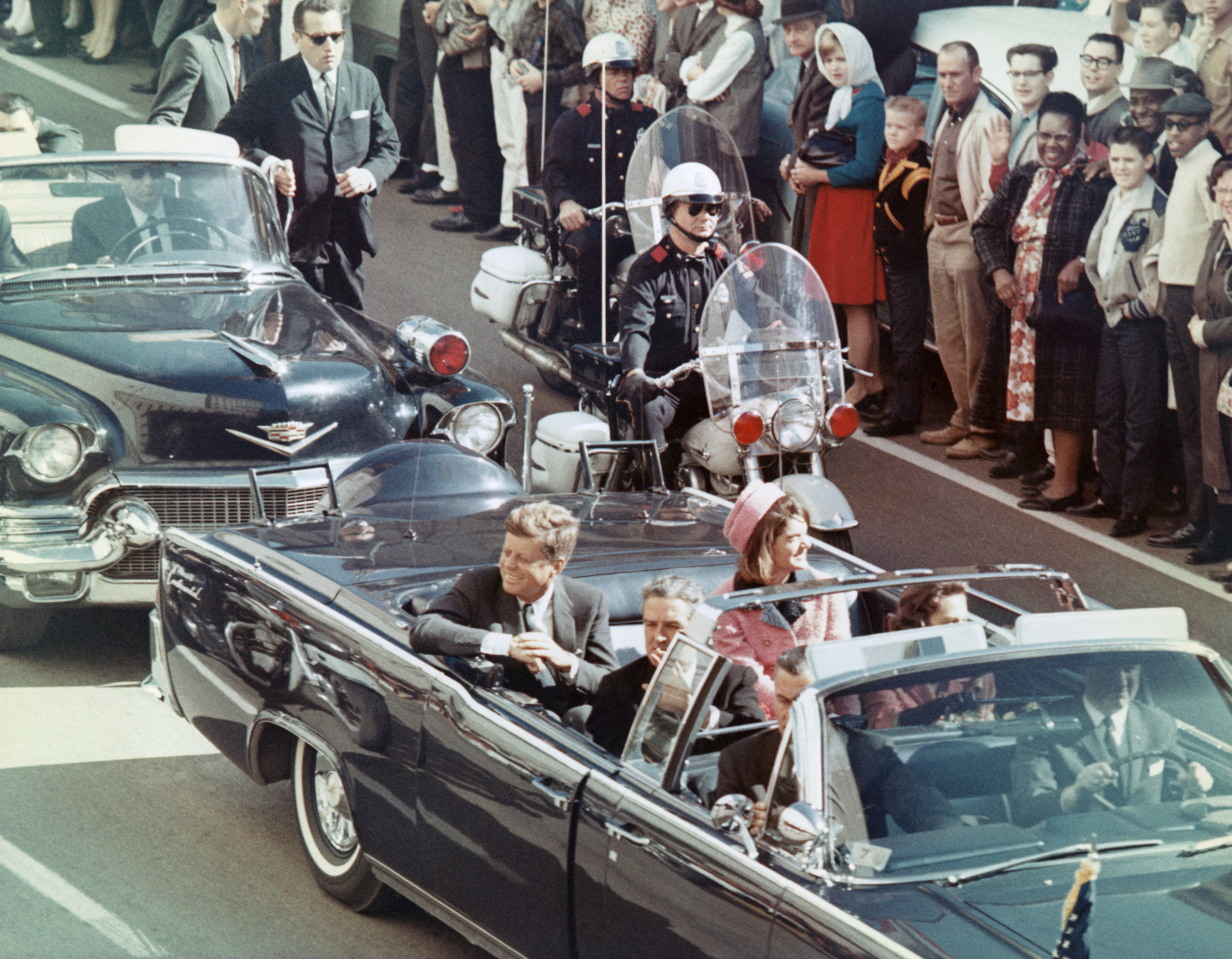
Multiple versions of John F. Kennedy's last words have been reported.

"No, you certainly can't." (Note: Also reported as, "That's obvious" and "My God, I've been hit.")

— John F. Kennedy, president of the United States (22 November 1963), replying to co-passenger Nellie Connally saying, "You certainly can't say Dallas doesn't love you, Mr. President" while travelling through Dallas in a motorcade, shortly before he was fatally shot

"Thank you."
—C.S. Lewis, a British author of The Chronicles of Narnia, literary scholar and Anglican lay theologian (22 November 1963) of kidney failure, at age 64. He was diagnosed with end-stage kidney failure in mid-November. He collapsed in his bedroom at 5:30 pm on 22 November, at age 64, and died a few minutes later.

"10–4." (Note: This was Tippit's last radio transmission. He apparently spoke to his killer just before being shot.)
— J. D. Tippit, American police officer (22 November 1963), over his police radio shortly before being shot and killed, less than one hour after the Kennedy assassination

"LSD, 100 μg, im"
— Aldous Huxley, philosopher, writer (22 November 1963), to his wife Laura ("im" being an abbreviation for intramuscular)

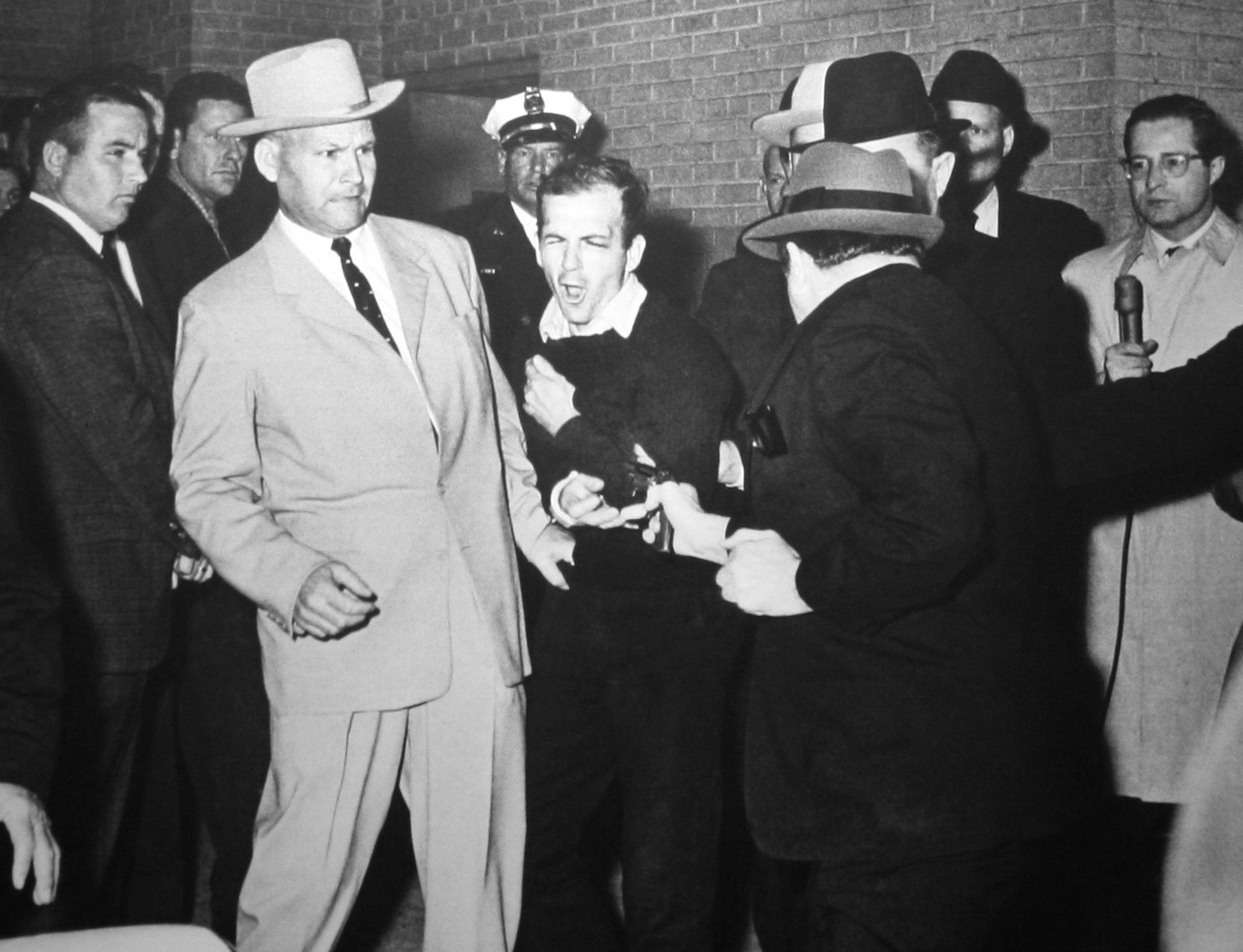
Jack Ruby shoots Lee Harvey Oswald.

"I want to see the American Civil Liberties Union."
— Lee Harvey Oswald, accused of killing Kennedy and Tippit (24 November 1963), shortly before he was shot by Jack Ruby

"You made one mistake. You married me." (Note: Also reported as, "Bless you, Sister. May all your sons be bishops" (to a nursing nun).)
— Brendan Behan, Irish writer (20 March 1964), to his wife Beatrice

"Am I dying or is this my birthday?" (Note: Also reported as, "Jakie, is it my birthday or am I dying?")
— Nancy Astor, Viscountess Astor, American-born British politician (2 May 1964), awakening on her deathbed to see her entire family around her. (Astor died 17 days before her birthday.)

"This is my final word. It is time for me to become an apprentice once more. I have not settled in which direction." (Note: Also reported as, "But maybe I wouldn't wake up" (to his physician, who had suggested he get some rest).)
— Max Aitken, 1st Baron Beaverbrook (9 June 1964), Canadian-British newspaper publisher, at his 85th birthday party held 15 days before his death.

"When I have your wounded."
— Charles L. Kelly, United States Army helicopter pilot and medical evacuation unit commander (1 July 1964), responding to warning to leave a dangerous landing zone during a Vietnam War rescue mission. Kelly was then struck by a bullet.

"My God, Ned, help me! I'm on fire!"
— Fireball Roberts, American stock car racer (2 July 1964), inside his burning car after 24 May 1964 wreck during the World 600 at Charlotte Motor Speedway. Roberts survived for six weeks before dying of his injuries.

"I am sorry to trouble you chaps. I don't know how you get along so fast with the traffic on the road these days."
— Ian Fleming, English naval intelligence officer and novelist (12 August 1964), to ambulance crew

"I'm sorry, boys, I'm all wet."
— Gracie Allen, American vaudevillian and comedian (27 August 1964)

"Valerie."
— T. S. Eliot, American-born British poet (4 January 1965), whispering the name of his wife, Valerie Eliot

"I'm bored with it all."
— Winston Churchill, prime minister of the United Kingdom (24 January 1965)

"Maria."
— Nat King Cole, American singer (15 February 1965), saying his wife's name to a hospital nurse

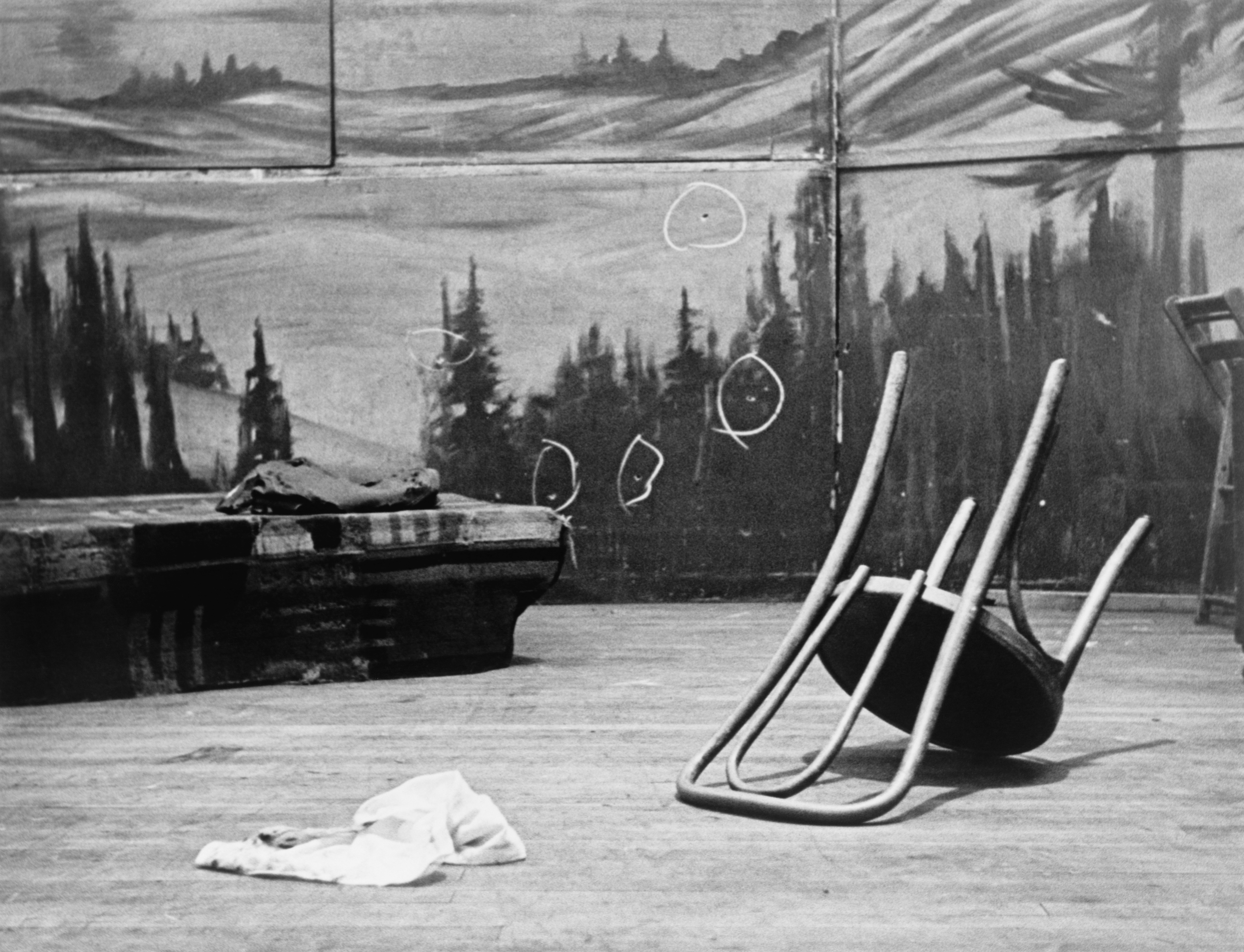
Bullet holes in the back of the Audubon Ballroom stage, where Malcolm X was shot.

"Brothers! Brothers, please! This is a house of peace!"
— Malcolm X, American activist (21 February 1965), trying to calm a 400-person chaos shortly before being killed by gunfire from multiple assailants

"I'd rather be skiing than doing this." (when asked if he skied) "No, but I'd rather be doing that than doing this."
— Stan Laurel, English actor, member of the duo Laurel and Hardy (23 February 1965), to a nurse

"I've got to get out!"
— Lou Everett, American test pilot (27 April 1965), prior to failed ejection from Ryan XV-5 Vertifan

"Well, Jan, we were lucky at that."
— Edward R. Murrow, American broadcast journalist and war correspondent (27 April 1965), patting the hand of his wife, Janet Huntington Brewster

″Front, your time and Kakuei Tanaka's era will come eventually. Politics must not be pampering to the people. I'll leave the rest to you.″
"前尾、やがて、お前や田中角栄の時代が来るだろう。国民を甘やかす政治をすてはならない。後事は、君たちに託す"
— Hayato Ikeda, former Prime Minister of Japan (13 August 1965), a message to Kakuei Tanaka, former Secretary General of Liberal Democratic Party (Japan)

"Jenny, I know you don't want me to die, but I'm going to die. I can tell it."

— Sylvia Likens, American teenage girl (26 October 1965), last recorded message to her sister Jenny after her torture

"I am the only one who held the largest responsibility of the failed G30S and supported by other PKI members and mass organizations under the PKI [...] Rather I am being captured, better you kill me...! [...] Long live, PKI!"
— D. N. Aidit, Indonesian communist and Communist Party of Indonesia leader (22 November 1965), prior to being summarily executed by Jasir Hadibroto and other executioners from the army. It was said that his last words were 30 minutes of inflaming speech against the army, resulting in the executioners shortly firing lethal shots after he shouted "Long live, PKI!"

"Dying is a very dull, dreary affair. And my advice to you is to have nothing whatever to do with it."
— W. Somerset Maugham, English author (15 December 1965), to his nephew Robin Maugham

"Oh, father. Oh, Rama!"
— Lal Bahadur Shastri, Prime Minister of India (11 January 1966), to his doctors

"Why can't I give up at last?"
— Buster Keaton, American actor, comedian and filmmaker (1 February 1966)

"It's the best I can do."
— James A. Gardner, United States Army officer and Medal of Honor recipient (7 February 1966), killed while destroying enemy bunkers during the Vietnam War

"Final ILS two four."
— Elliot See, American astronaut (28 February 1966), prior to plane crash that killed him and fellow astronaut Charles Bassett

"Absolutely not!"
— Montgomery Clift, American actor (23 July 1966), to his private nurse, Lorenzo James, who had suggested they watch The Misfits on television

"Do you know where I can get any shit?"
— Lenny Bruce, American comedian (3 August 1966), asking about the availability of drugs

"Everything's already been said." (Note: Incorrectly reported as, "How about this for a headline? French fries." French actually made a similar comment to reporter Bob Gregory days earlier.)
— James French, American murderer (10 August 1966), when asked if he had any last words before his death by electric chair

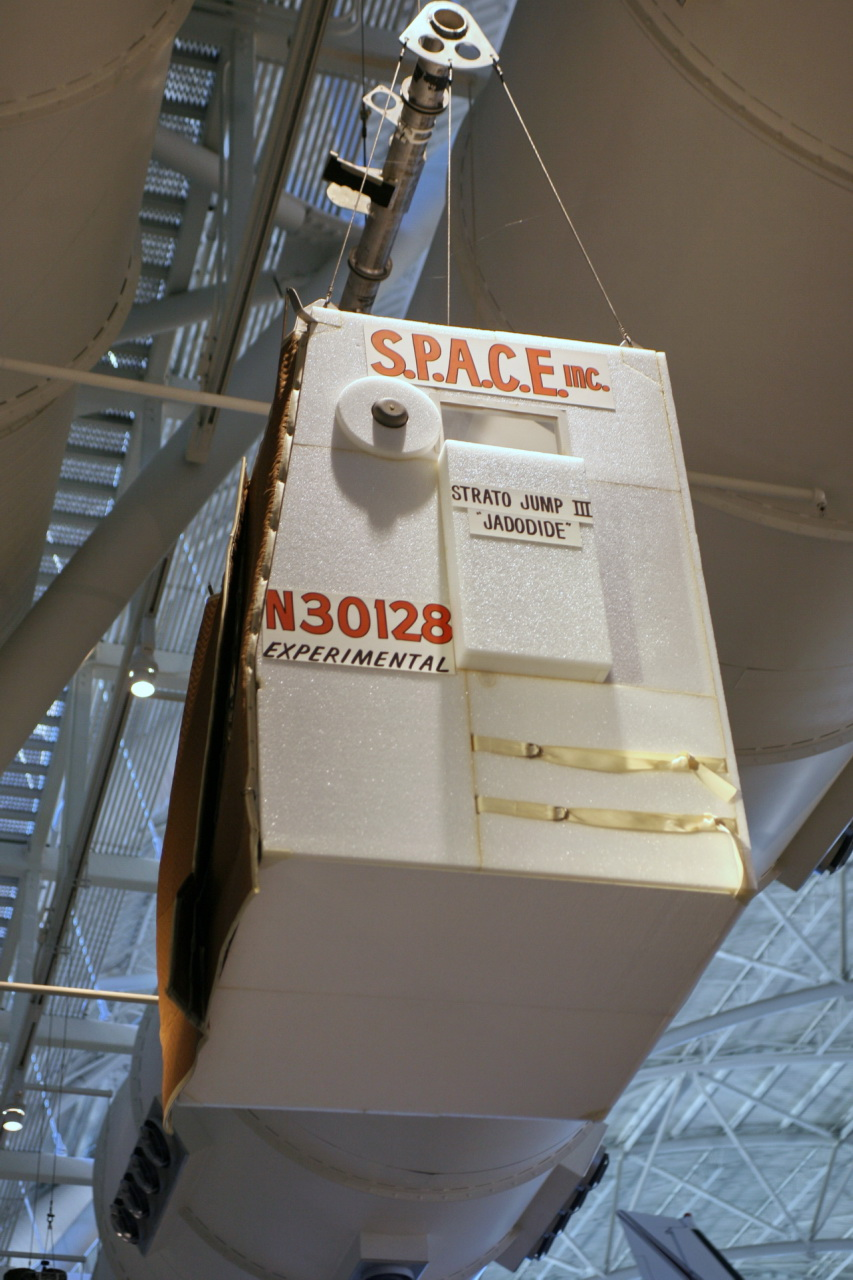
Strato Jump III gondola at the Smithsonian Institution's National Air and Space Museum.

"Emerg—"
— Nick Piantanida, American parachutist (29 August 1966), making emergency transmission from Strato Jump III balloon during decompression accident on 1 May 1966; the accident left him in a coma until his death

"A party! Let's have a party."
— Margaret Sanger, American birth control activist (6 September 1966)

"Ron Miller \ Way Down Cellar \ Kirt Russell^{[sic]} \ CIA – Mobley"
— Walt Disney, American animation pioneer and businessman (15 December 1966), written on the bottom of a page

"The water's dark green and I can't see a bloody thing. Hallo the bow is up. I'm going. I'm on my back. I'm gone."
— Donald Campbell, British racer (4 January 1967), just before fatal crash of Bluebird K7 hydroplane while trying to set new world water speed record

"How are we going to get to the moon if we can't talk between two or three buildings?"
— Gus Grissom, American astronaut (27 January 1967), during Apollo 1 launch rehearsal test moments before a deadly fire broke out

"We've got a bad fire! Let's get out... We're burning up!"
— Roger B. Chaffee, American astronaut (27 January 1967), reporting that a fire had broken out during Apollo 1 launch rehearsal test

"God bless you, please make it quick."
— Ronald Ryan, Australian criminal (3 February 1967), to the hangman. Ryan was the last person to be executed in Australia prior to the abolition of the death penalty in 1985.

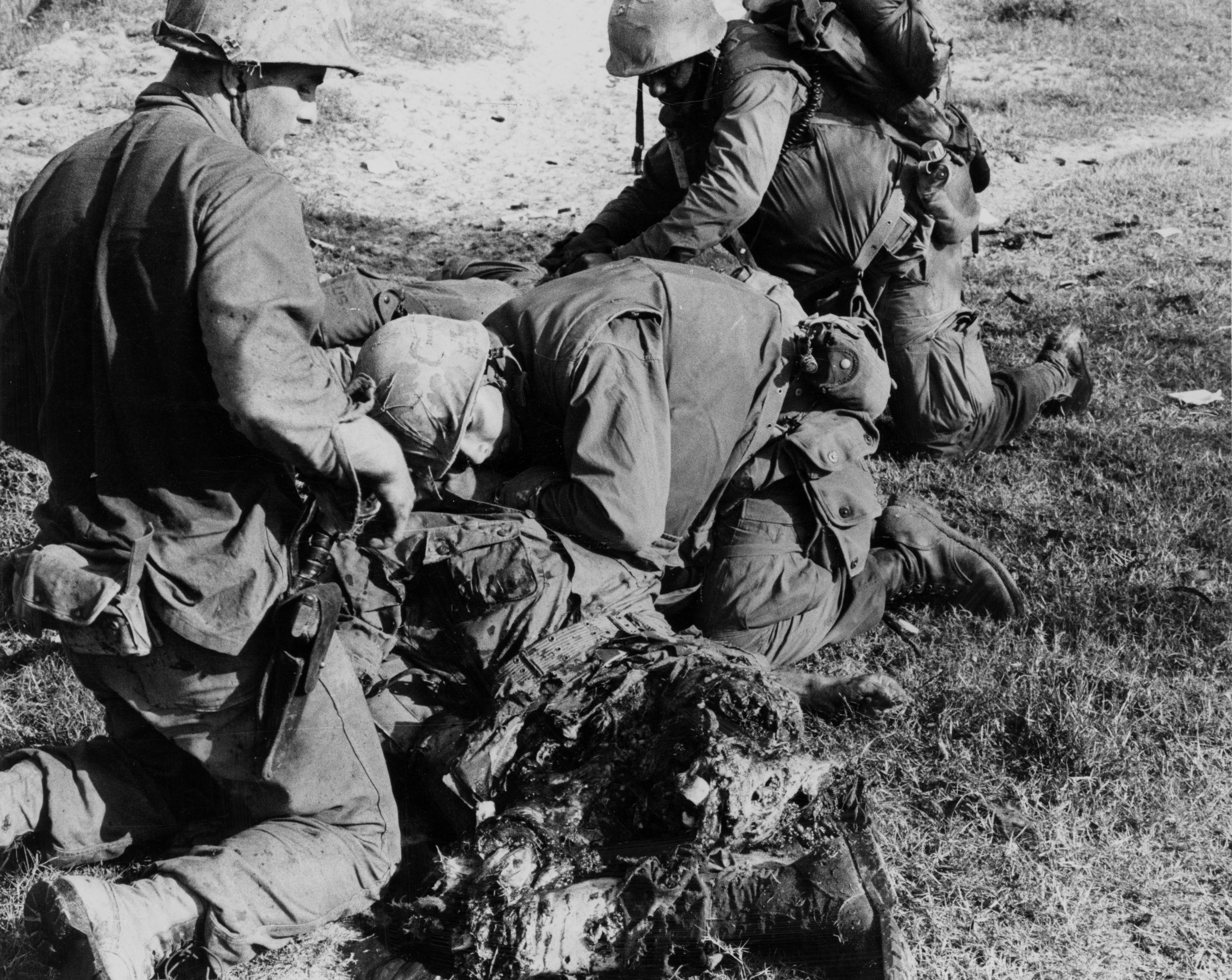
Corpsmen attempt to save Fall and Highland.

"We've reached one of our phase lines after the fire fight and it smells bad—meaning it's a little bit suspicious...Could be an amb—"
— Bernard B. Fall, American war correspondent and historian (21 February 1967); spoken into tape recorder just before stepping on land mine that killed him and U.S. Marine Byron G. Highland during the Vietnam War

"To leave this life, to me, is a sweet prospect. When you read this I will be quite dead and no answer will be possible. All I can say is that I offered you love, and the best I could. All I got in return in the end was a kick in the teeth. Thus I die alone and unloved. As you sowed, so shall you reap."
— David Ferrie, American pilot (22 February 1967), in apparent suicide note (alluding to Galatians 6:7). Ferrie's autopsy concluded that he had died of natural causes.

"Grenades. Grenades."
— Ruppert L. Sargent, United States Army officer and Medal of Honor recipient (15 March 1967), prior to falling on two grenades during the Vietnam War

"I've loved you very much, Franca, very much."
("Ti ho amato moltissimo Franca, tantissimo.")
— Antonio De Curtis (alias Totò), Italian actor, comedian, screenwriter, dramatist, poet, singer and lyricist (15 April 1967), to his wife, Franca Faldini, after suffering a heart attack

"No reason to weep." (Note: Also reported as, "Kein Grund zum Weinen" ("No reason to cry") and as "Stick together. See as much as possible of one another" (to his family). The latter version is described as an indirect quote of Adenauer's last coherent statement.)
("Da jitt et nix zo kriesche!")
— Konrad Adenauer, Chancellor of West Germany (19 April 1967)

"Thank you for transmitting all of that. [Separation] occurred. [garbled]"
— Vladimir Komarov, Soviet cosmonaut (24 April 1967), final transmission before fatal crash of Soyuz 1 spacecraft

"Excuse my dust."
— Dorothy Parker, American writer and wit (7 June 1967)

"On! On! On!" (Note: Incorrectly reported as, "Put me back on my bloody bike.")
— Tom Simpson, British cyclist (13 July 1967), asking to be put back on his bike prior to his death on Mont Ventoux during the 1967 Tour de France

"Stay quiet, Marine. You will be okay. Someone will be here to help you soon. God is with us all this day."
— Vincent R. Capodanno, United States Navy Roman Catholic chaplain and Medal of Honor recipient (4 September 1967), to a wounded Marine before being killed during Operation Swift in the Vietnam War

"Mayday, Mayday! This is NASA 922, ejecting just off Orlando...I mean Tallahassee!"
— Clifton Williams, American astronaut (5 October 1967), prior to unsuccessful ejection from crashing airplane

"Hullo, Griff. How are you getting on?"
— Clement Attlee, Prime Minister of the United Kingdom (8 October 1967), to his aide, Charlie Griffiths

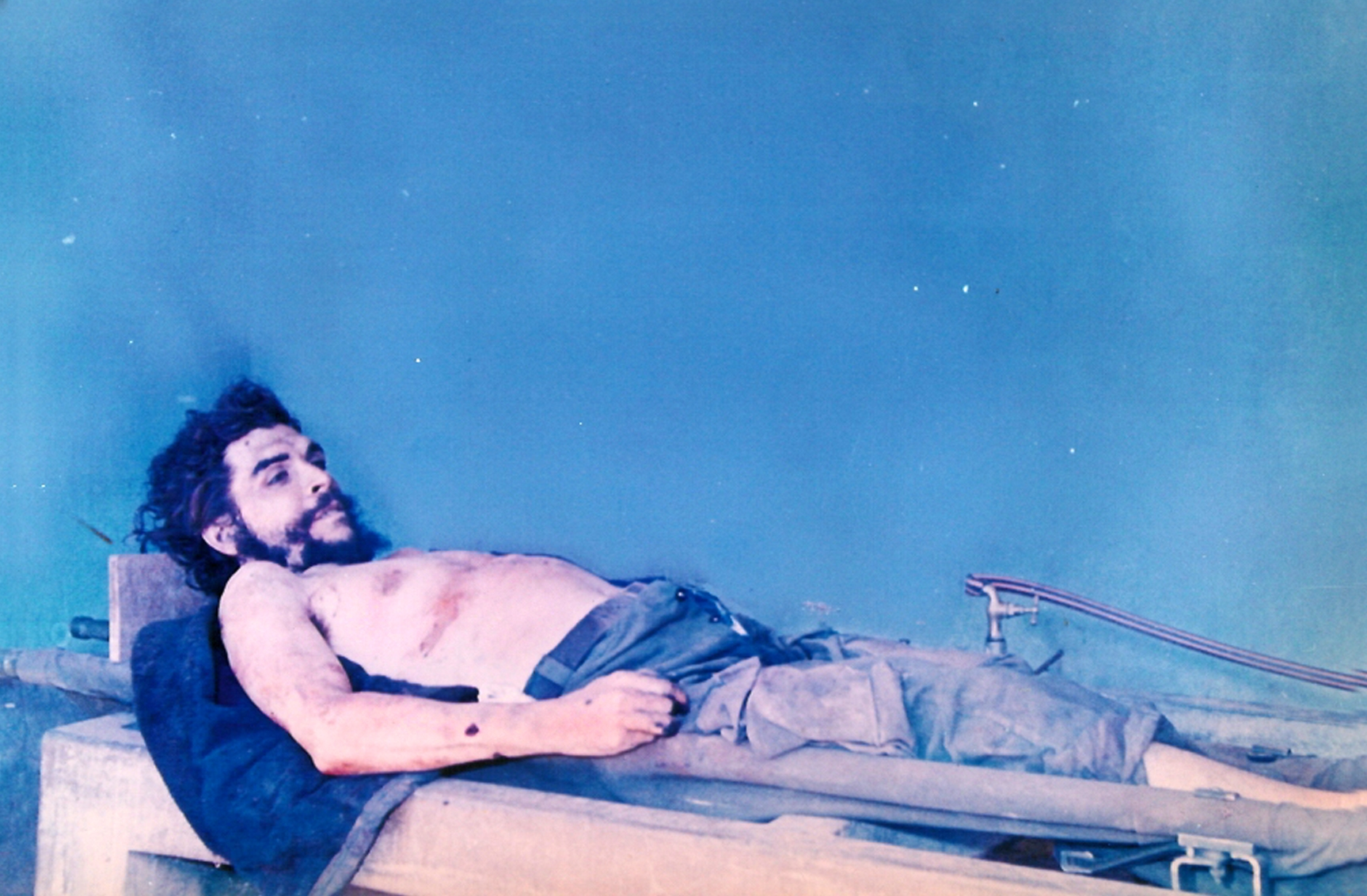
The corpse of Che Guevara the day after his execution.

"I know you are here to kill me. Shoot, coward, you are only going to kill a man." (Note: Also reported as, "Kill me! I'm just a man.")
("Sé que estás aquí para matarme. Dispara, cobarde, solo vas a matar a un hombre.")
— Che Guevara, Argentinean statesman and socialist revolutionary (9 October 1967), facing his captors

"Dear Ted, what has happened to us? I don't know. I feel myself in a spiral, going down down down, into a black hole from which there is no escape, no brightness. And loud in my ears from every side I hear, 'failure, failure, failure...' I love you so much ... I am too old and enmeshed in everything you do and are, that I cannot conceive of life without you ... My going will leave quite a rumor but you can say I was overworked and overwrought. Your reputation with your friends and fans will not be harmed ... Sometimes think of the fun we had all thru the years ..."
— Helen Palmer, American children's author, editor and philanthropist (23 October 1967), in her suicide note, addressed to her husband, Theodor "Dr. Seuss" Geisel

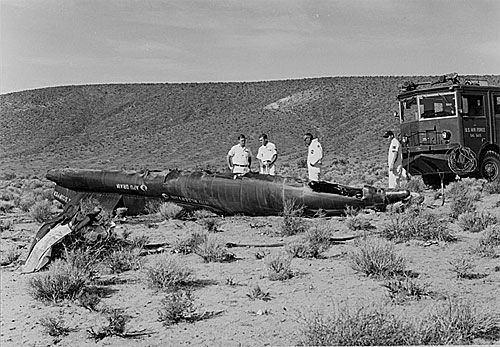
Wreckage of Michael J. Adams' X-15.

"I'm in a spin."
— Michael J. Adams, American astronaut (15 November 1967), prior to crash of North American X-15 spaceplane

"I know this beach like the back of my hand."
— Harold Holt, Prime Minister of Australia (17 December 1967), prior to disappearing while swimming at Cheviot Beach

"Never again, never again."
— Bill Masterton, Canadian American ice hockey player (15 January 1968), after sustaining fatal head injury in NHL game

"Mary Gaston, get my shoes; I must go to preach."
— Bob Jones Sr., American evangelist, founder of Bob Jones University (16 January 1968), to his wife before entering semi-coma

"Dad! Dad! Where are you? I need you!"
— Lance Sijan, United States Air Force fighter pilot and Medal of Honor recipient (22 January 1968), dying in Hỏa Lò Prison during the Vietnam War

"I am going over. We are laying over. Help me. I am going over. Give my love and the crew's love to the wives and families."
— Phil Gay, captain of fishing trawler Ross Cleveland (4 February 1968), final radio message before ship sank

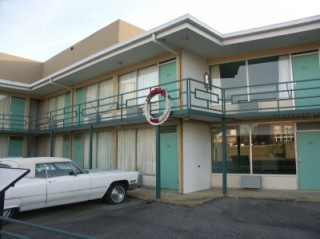
The Lorraine Motel, site of Martin Luther King Jr.'s assassination, now home to the National Civil Rights Museum.

"Ben, make sure you play 'Take My Hand, Precious Lord' in the meeting tonight. Play it real pretty."
— Martin Luther King Jr., American civil rights activist (4 April 1968), speaking to musician Ben Branch shortly before being assassinated

"Don't lift me."
— Robert F. Kennedy, American politician (6 June 1968), speaking to medical attendants who lifted him onto a stretcher several minutes after he was fatally shot and lost consciousness shortly thereafter

"I'm awful tired now, Hank. I've got to go to bed."
— Red Foley, American country music singer (19 September 1968)

"God sits in the regiments! That is why I am not afraid. Stay confident in also the darkest moments! Let us hope not fall, the hope for all people, for all the peoples of the world. God let us not fall, not a single one of us and all of us together. It is governed." (Note: Also reported as, "Keep your chin up! Never mind! He will reign!" and as "We shall not be downhearted! Never! For 'He reigns'" (quoting the last words of J. C. Blumhardt).)
— Karl Barth, Swiss Reformed theologian (10 December 1968), over the telephone to his friend Eduard Thurneysen

"Codeine... bourbon."
— Tallulah Bankhead, American actress (12 December 1968)

"Somebody's got to care."
— Garfield M. Langhorn, United States Army soldier and Medal of Honor recipient (15 January 1969), prior to falling on a grenade to protect wounded soldiers during the Vietnam War

"Don't worry, be happy."
— Meher Baba, Indian spiritual master (31 January 1969); last words spoken on 10 July 1925, after which he observed silence for the rest of his life

"Walter Pidgeon."
— Boris Karloff, English actor (2 February 1969), before dying of pneumonia

"I've always loved my wife, my children, and my grandchildren, and I've always loved my country. I want to go. God, take me."
— Dwight D. Eisenhower, president of the United States (28 March 1969)

"God don't let me die, take care of my wife and two kids."
— Félix Conde Falcón, United States Army soldier and Medal of Honor recipient (4 April 1969), mortally wounded during the Vietnam War

"I'm doing all right, I'm doing all right, uh."
— Paul Meyer, United States Air Force airman (23 May 1969), final transmission before crashing into the English Channel in a stolen aircraft

"How nice, if I were to die now I would be happy..."
("Che bello, se dovessi morire adesso sarei felice..")
— C. F. Powell, FRS, British physicist (9 August 1969), before dying in Casargo, Italy on balcony with scenic view

"Please — please don't kill me. I don't want to die. I want to live. I want to have my baby. I want to have my baby."
— Sharon Tate, American actress (9 August 1969), confirmed by confessed murderer Susan Atkins (one of the members of the Manson family led by Charles Manson) during the murders to be among the pregnant actress' last words.

== 1970–1979 ==
"Mommy, promise you won't leave me, will you, Mommy?"
— Edwarda O'Bara, American high school student (3 January 1970), while talking to her mother before slipping into a diabetic coma and losing consciousness, she lived another 42 years without regaining consciousness dying 21 November 2012

"330 is crashing, ... goodbye everybody, goodbye everybody!"

— Co-pilot Armand Etienne, Co-pilot on Swissair Flight 330 (21 February 1970), talking with an Air Traffic controller in Zurich before the plane crashed due to a terrorist bomb.

"Anyway, I can get a good rest in the morning. There's no rehearsal till three."
— John Barbirolli, British conductor (29 July 1970), to his wife after awakening during the night

"Happy anniversary. I love you."
— Vince Lombardi, American football coach (3 September 1970), to his wife

"Roger."
— William Schaffner, United States Air Force pilot (8 September 1970), prior to his BAC Lightning crashing into the North Sea; some commentators would allege that a UFO was involved in the incident

"I need help bad, man."
— Jimi Hendrix, American musician, singer, and songwriter (18 September 1970), to his manager, Chas Chandler, in an answering machine message he left for him

"I feel pain here."
("Ça fait mal là.")
— Charles de Gaulle, French statesman (9 November 1970), pointing at his neck seconds before he unexpectedly died from an aneurysm

"Human life is limited; but I would like to live forever."
("人間の命には限りがあります. しかし、私は永遠に生きたいと思っています.")
— Yukio Mishima, Japanese author (25 November 1970), prior to seppuku

"You see, this is how you die."
("Vous voyez, c'est comme ça que vous mourez.")
— Coco Chanel, French fashion businesswoman (10 January 1971), to her maid

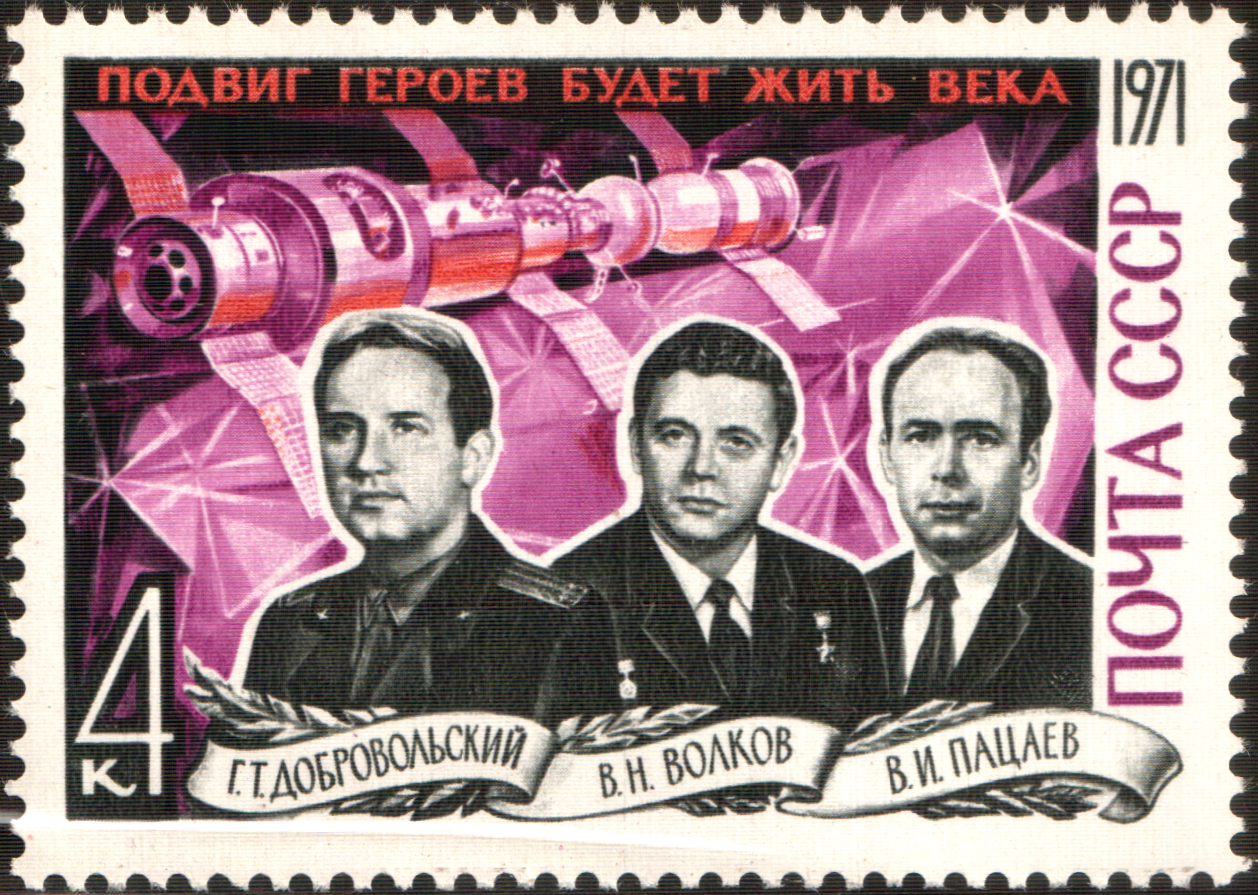
Soviet stamp memorializing the Soyuz 11 crew: Dobrovolsky, Volkov and Viktor Patsayev.

"I am beginning the descent procedure."
— Georgy Dobrovolsky, Soviet cosmonaut (30 June 1971), prior to fatal reentry of Soyuz 11

"Prepare cognac, see you tomorrow!"
— Vladislav Volkov, Soviet cosmonaut (30 June 1971), final transmission from Soyuz 11 prior to fatal reentry

"Are you there, Pam? Pam, are you there?"
— Jim Morrison, American singer, musician, songwriter and poet (3 July 1971), to his girlfriend Pamela Courson

"I had him by the throat but the bastard shot me." (Note: Also reported as, "I had him by the throat Carl, but he shot me.")
— Gerry Richardson, GC, British police officer (23 August 1971), to PC Carl Walker, GC, referring to armed robber Frederick Joseph Sewell, who had shot both of them. Walker survived.

"Mama, if I get through this, I swear I'll be a better man."
— Gene Vincent, American rock and roll and rockabilly musician (12 October 1971), dying of a bleeding ulcer while in his mother's trailer.

"If this is what viral pneumonia does to one, I really don't think I shall bother to have it again."
— Gladys Cooper, English actress (17 November 1971), looking in a mirror

"Dear world, I am leaving because I am bored. I feel I have lived long enough. I am leaving you with your worries in this sweet cesspool — good luck."
— George Sanders, British actor (25 April 1972); one of his suicide notes

"Blame only the regime for my death."
("Dėl mano mirties kaltinkite tik santvarką.")
— Romas Kalanta, Lithuanian high school student (14 May 1972), prior to committing suicide by self-immolation to protest the Soviet regime in Lithuania

"How did the Mets do today?"
— Moe Berg, American baseball player (29 May 1972), to his nurse

"You have destroyed the beauty of the world!"
(" Vous avez détruit la beauté du monde! ")
— Huguette Gaulin, Canadian Novelist (June 6, 1972), who committed suicide by burning herself.

"I have got that woman. We are all right."
— Adrian McGill, Glasgow Fire Service Sub Officer (18 November 1972), shouting to other firefighters from the top floor of a burning building. The woman whom McGill died trying to save also died.

"Come and get me! Come and get me!"
— Mark Essex, perpetrator of the New Orleans sniper attacks (7 January 1973), yelling at New Orleans Police as he charged them, being shot and killed by the officers shortly afterwards.

"Send Mike immediately."
— Lyndon B. Johnson, president of the United States (22 January 1973), referring to his Secret Service agent. By the time Mike arrived, Johnson had already died.

"Good night my darlings. I'll see you tomorrow."
— Noël Coward, English playwright, composer and performer (26 March 1973), to Graham Payn, his life partner, and Cole Lesley, his secretary, while going to bed the night before he died

"Drink to me, drink to my health. You know I can't drink anymore."
— Pablo Picasso, Spanish artist (8 April 1973)

"You won't do it!"
— Dean Corll, American serial killer (August 8, 1973), moments before Elmer Wayne Henley fatally shot him.

"It is stuffy, sticky, and rainy here at present – but forecasts are more favourable."
— J. R. R. Tolkien, English writer and academic (2 September 1973), postscript of letter to his daughter Priscilla

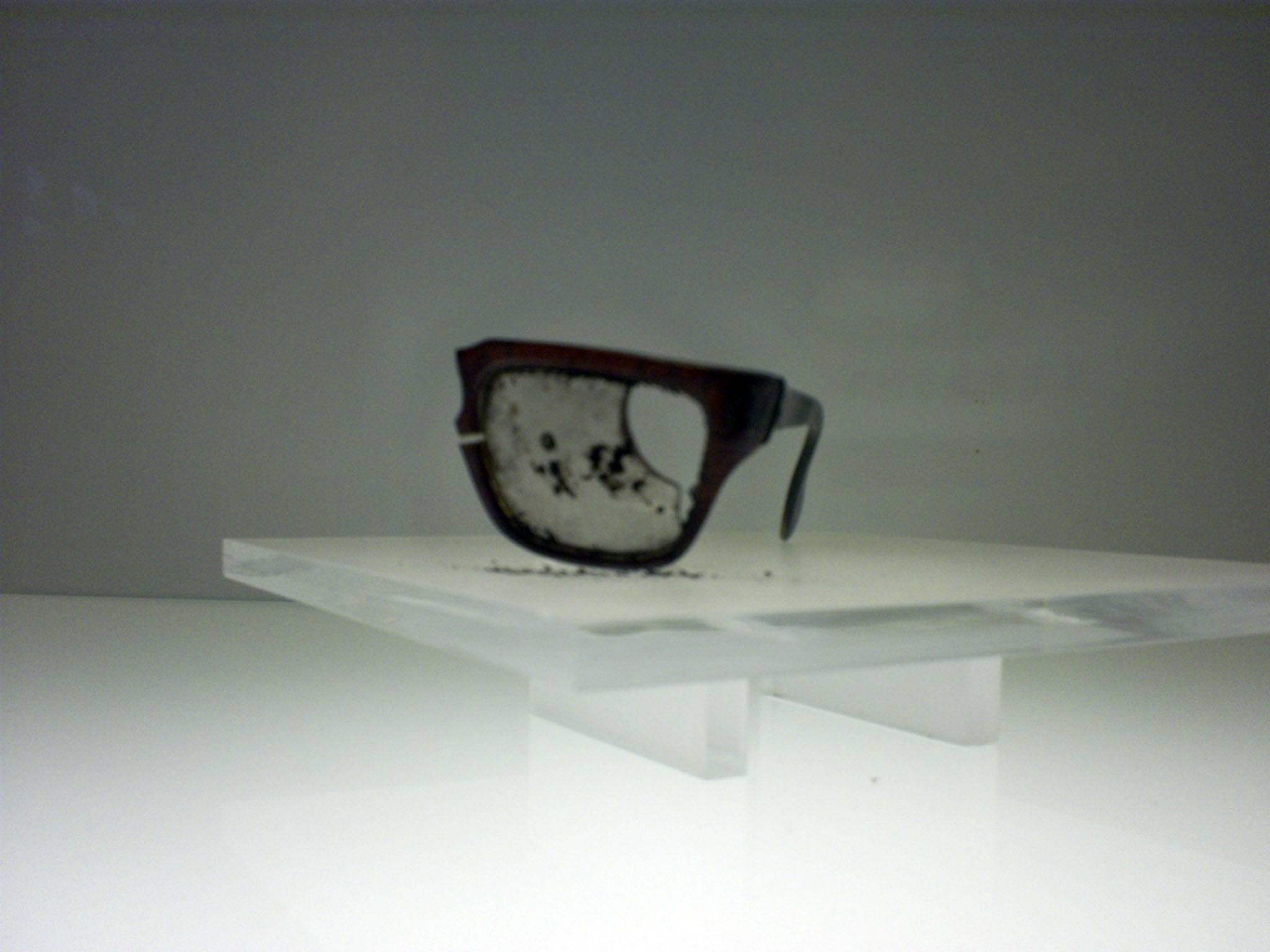
Salvador Allende's eyeglasses, found after his death.

"These are my last words, and I am certain that my sacrifice will not be in vain. I am certain that, at the very least, it will be a moral lesson that will punish felony, cowardice and treason."
("Estas son mis últimas palabras y tengo la certeza de que mi sacrificio no será en vano, tengo la certeza de que, por lo menos, será una lección moral que castigará la felonía, la cobardía y la traición.")
— Salvador Allende Gossens, Marxist President of Chile (11 September 1973), addressing the nation during the 1973 Chilean coup d'état moments before killing himself

"Remember, it's the first 60 years that count and I've got 30 to go. I love you."
— Jim Croce, American folk and rock singer-songwriter (20 September 1973), in a letter written to his wife Ingrid shortly before he boarded a plane that killed him

"Throw it, just throw it."
— Murray Hudson, GC, New Zealand infantry sergeant (13 February 1974), to a soldier who froze with an armed grenade; the grenade exploded as Hudson tried to release it, killing both men

"My dear, before you kiss me goodbye, fix your hair. It's a mess."
— George Kelly, American playwright and actor (18 June 1974), to one of his nieces

"In keeping with the WXLT practice of presenting the most immediate and complete reports of local blood-and-guts news, TV-40 presents what is believed to be a television first — in living color, exclusive coverage of an attempted suicide."
— Christine Chubbuck, American news anchor for WWSB (formerly known as WXLT) (15 July 1974), just before shooting herself in the head on air

"I don't want my jeans to get dirty..."
("Джинсы бы не испачкать...")
— Anatoli Kozhemyakin, Soviet footballer (13 October 1974), trying to exit a stuck elevator before it began moving, crushing him to death

"Pull now ... pull, that's it."
— Walter A. Zadra, first officer of Northwest Orient Airlines Flight 6231 (1 December 1974), before plane crashed in Harriman State Park (New York)

"The rise and fall of the country is everyone's responsibility; an individual's life and death is the least important."
(「天下興亡，匹夫有責；個人生死，不足掛齒。」)
— Chiang Kai-shek, Chinese nationalist politician, President of the Republic of China (5 April 1975)

"Oh, you young people act like old men. You are no fun."

— Josephine Baker, French-American dancer and singer (12 April 1975)

"Anne, I love you. Blair, I love you. I will not be allowed to love and trust everybody. This is better. Pete. P.S. Stan Polley is a soulless bastard. I will take him with me."
— Pete Ham, Welsh musician and songwriter (24 April 1975), written on a suicide note before hanging himself

"You can't kill this tough Jew."
— Rod Serling, American screenwriter (28 June 1975), note written from hospital bed to colleague Owen Comora

"Mark, I've seen God four times, and I'm going to see him again soon. That's No. 1 to me, and you're No. 2."
— Vaughn Bodē, American cartoonist and illustrator (18 July 1975), to his son

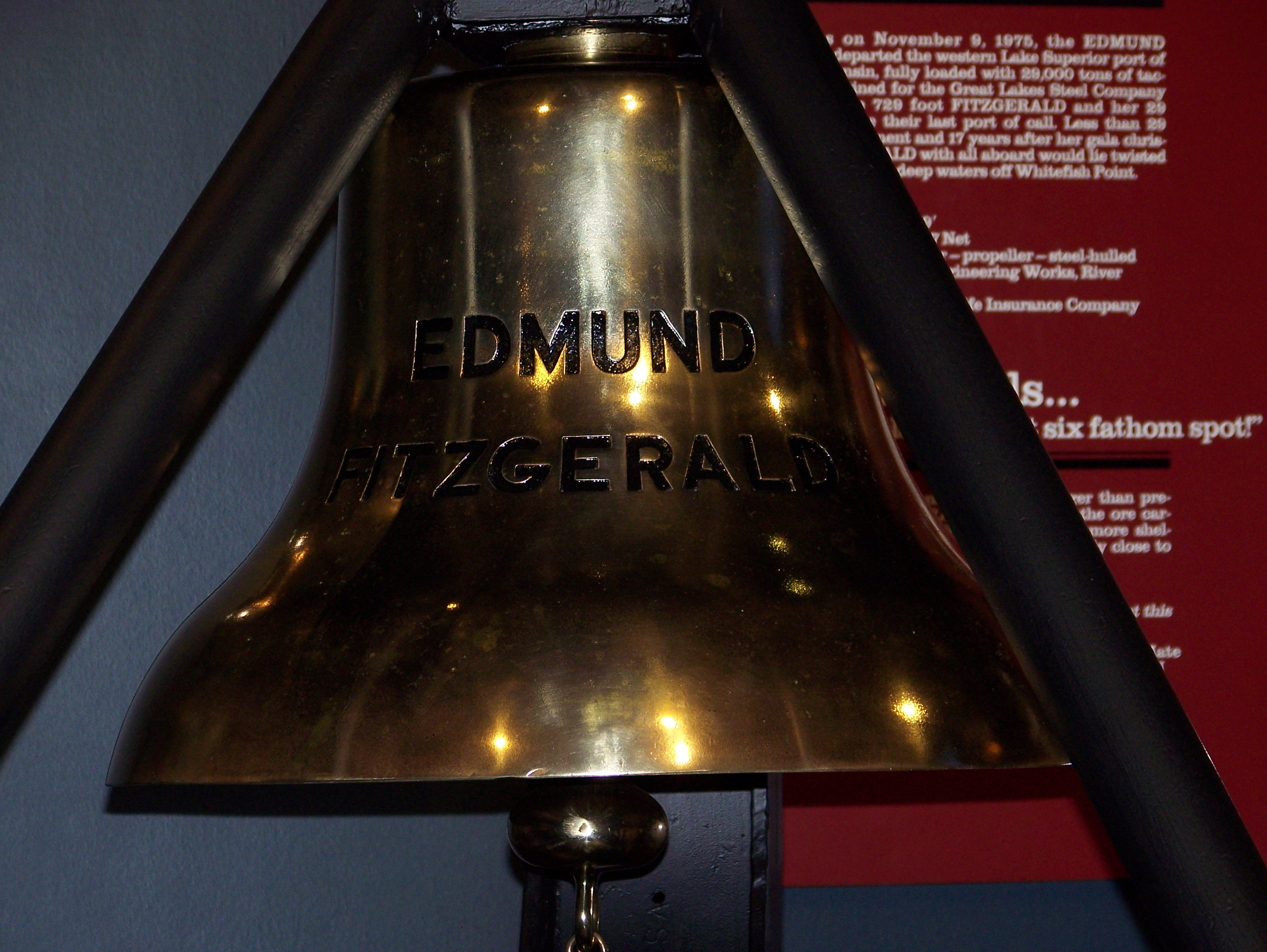
The ship's bell from SS Edmund Fitzgerald, recovered from the wreck in 1995.

"We are holding our own."
— Ernest M. McSorley, Canadian sailor and captain of SS Edmund Fitzgerald (10 November 1975), last transmission before ship went down in storm on Lake Superior

"When I meet God, I am going to ask him two questions: Why relativity? And why turbulence? I really believe he will have an answer for the first."
— Werner Heisenberg, German theoretical physicist (1 February 1976)

"Oh God! No! Help! Someone help!"
— Sal Mineo, American actor (12 February 1976), while being murdered

"I feel ill. Call the doctors."
("我很难受，叫医生来。")
— Mao Zedong, Chinese statesman and revolutionary (9 September 1976)

"Let's do it!" (Note: Gilmore is also oft-quoted as saying a few minutes earlier, as he walked past the Hi-Fi Murderers on his way to be executed: "Adios, Pierre and Andrews. I'll be seeing you directly.")
— Gary Gilmore, American criminal (17 January 1977), prior to execution by firing squad

"I must end it. There's no hope left. I'll be at peace. No one had anything to do with this. My decision totally."
— Freddie Prinze, American stand-up comedian and actor (29 January 1977), as his suicide note, before shooting himself in the head

"There's nothing more to say. It's all in the film."
— Edith Ewing Bouvier Beale, American socialite (5 February 1977), to her daughter, Edith Bouvier Beale, referring to the documentary Grey Gardens

"Oh yes."
— Jacob Veldhuyzen van Zanten, pilot of KLM Flight 4805 (27 March 1977), shortly before colliding with Pan Am Flight 1736.

"Bless me, Father, for I have sinned."
— Robert Nairac GC, British Army intelligence officer (15 May 1977), abducted and shot to death by the Provisional Irish Republican Army. His last words were addressed to one of his abductors, who posed as a priest in an attempt to gain information through Nairac's confession.

"A certain butterfly is already on the wing."
— Vladimir Nabokov, Russian-American author and entomologist (2 July 1977); he had a keen interest in butterflies

"TV four just lost-"
— Francis Gary Powers, American pilot (1 August 1977), last radio transmission before a helicopter crash killed him and cameraman George Spears

"I'm going to the bathroom to read." (Note: Also reported as, "I'm going to the can, Ginger" (to his girlfriend, Ginger Alden).)
— Elvis Presley, American musician (16 August 1977), shortly before being found dead on the bathroom floor

"This is no way to live!"
— Groucho Marx, American actor and comedian (19 August 1977)

"Horrible. Horrible!"
— MacKinlay Kantor, American author (11 October 1977), to his grandson, Tom Shroder

"That was a great game of golf, fellas. Let's go have a Coca-Cola."
— Bing Crosby, American singer and actor (14 October 1977), moments before collapsing and dying of a heart attack

"Why not? After all, it belongs to him."
— Charlie Chaplin, English actor and filmmaker (25 December 1977), to a priest who had said, "May the Lord have mercy on your soul"

"What do you think I'm gonna do? Blow my brains out?"
— Terry Kath, American lead singer and guitarist for Chicago (23 January 1978), before accidentally shooting himself

"Don't worry, I can do it. I can get to land." (Note: Also reported as, "I'll be okay. Everything will be okay.")
— Eddie Aikau, American lifeguard and surfer (17 March 1978), leaving voyaging canoe Hōkūleʻa after it began leaking to paddle to shore for help. The rest of the canoe's crew were rescued.

"If you don't like it, you can fuck off!"
— Keith Moon, English drummer for the rock band the Who (7 September 1978), to his girlfriend Annette Walter-Lax

"This is it, baby! Brace yourself."
— Captain James McFeron, pilot of Pacific Southwest Airlines Flight 182 (25 September 1978), as the Boeing 727 crashed after colliding with a Cessna 172 over San Diego

"Tomorrow, we will see each other, if the Lord still wishes it, and we will celebrate Mass together."
— Pope John Paul I, Italian Roman Catholic prelate and Pope (28 September 1978), who had just elected as Pope following the papal conclave on the death of his predecessor, Pope Paul VI, who died in 6 August

"It is hovering and it's not an aircraft."
— Frederick Valentich, Australian aviator (21 October 1978), last transmission before disappearing after possibly sighting a UFO

"We didn't commit suicide, we committed an act of revolutionary suicide protesting the conditions of an inhumane world."
— Jim Jones, American cult leader and mass murderer (18 November 1978), speaking to his followers, shortly after they had all been poisoned with cyanide. Jones died of a possibly self-inflicted gunshot wound to the head, while his followers died of cyanide poisoning.

"All stop."
— Tony Prangley, British commercial diver (26 November 1978), prior to anchor chain severing diving bell connections to MS Star Canopus, causing bell containing Prangley and fellow diver Michael Ward to plummet to the sea floor

"Leave the shower curtain on the inside of the tub."
— Conrad Hilton, American hotelier (3 January 1979), on being asked if he had any final words of wisdom

"It must have been the coffee."
— Jack Soo, American actor (11 January 1979); speaking to Hal Linden while being wheeled into operating room, referring to the bad coffee Soo's character made on their sitcom Barney Miller

"God help me [Allah madad], for I am innocent." (Note: Also reported as, "Finish it.")
— Zulfikar Ali Bhutto, President and Prime Minister of Pakistan (4 April 1979), prior to execution by hanging

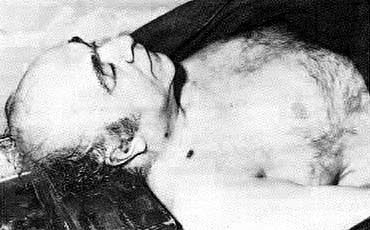
Hoveyda's body after his execution.

"It wasn't supposed to end like this."
— Amir-Abbas Hoveyda, Prime Minister of Iran (7 April 1979), during execution after the Iranian Revolution

"Capital punishment; them without the capital get the punishment."
— John Spenkelink, American convicted murderer (25 May 1979), prior to execution by electrocution

"Damn!"
— First officer James Dillard, pilot of American Airlines Flight 191 (25 May 1979); last word heard before CVR cut off.

"Of course I know who you are. You're my girl. I love you."
— John Wayne, American actor (11 June 1979), to his daughter, Aissa Wayne, who had asked if he knew who she was

"Are you guys okay?"
— Thurman Munson, American baseball player (2 August 1979), trapped in crashed plane, to his two passengers, who survived

"Do you really think the IRA would think me a worthwhile target?"
— Louis Mountbatten, 1st Earl Mountbatten of Burma, British Royal Navy officer and statesman (27 August 1979), prior to death in IRA bombing of his fishing boat

"Yes, I am fine..."
— Park Chung Hee, 3rd President of South Korea (26 October 1979), in response to Cha Ji Cheol and a woman next to him asking if he was all right after being shot by Kim Jae-gyu, prior to being fatally shot in the head

"Oh, Jesus Christ!"
— Captain Charles Gilbert (31 October 1979), pilot of Western Airlines Flight 2605, before the plane crashed into a hangar. His last words were captured on a black box.

"Go-around power please."
— Captain Thomas James "Jim" Collins (28 November 1979), New Zealand pilot of Air New Zealand Flight 901, before the plane crashed onto the slopes of Mount Erebus on a sightseeing Antarctic flight.

== 1980–1989 ==
"May God have mercy on the assassins."
— Óscar Romero, Salvadoran Roman Catholic prelate (24 March 1980), assassinated while giving a sermon

"I love you very much, my dear Beaver."
— Jean-Paul Sartre, French philosopher and writer (15 April 1980), to his partner, Simone de Beauvoir

"When you've been in the mountains for many years, you may forget that it's not a man's world. Every day I have to remember that this is not a world for man. This is the only sure way to approach it. Otherwise it's like when a boxer lets his guard down, it can stop very quickly."
("Lorsque vous avez été pendant de nombreuses anées en montagne, vous pouvez finir par oublier que ce n'est pas un monde pour l'homme. Chaque jour, je dois me souvenir que ce n'est pas un monde pour l'homme. C'est la seule façon sûre de l'aborder. Sinon c'est comme quand un boxeur baisse sa garde, ça peut s'arrêter très vite.")
— Nicolas Jaeger, French physician and alpinist (27 April 1980), prior to disappearing on Lhotse Shar in Nepal

"One never knows the ending. One has to die to know exactly what happens after death, although Catholics have their hopes."
— Alfred Hitchcock KBE, English filmmaker (29 April 1980)

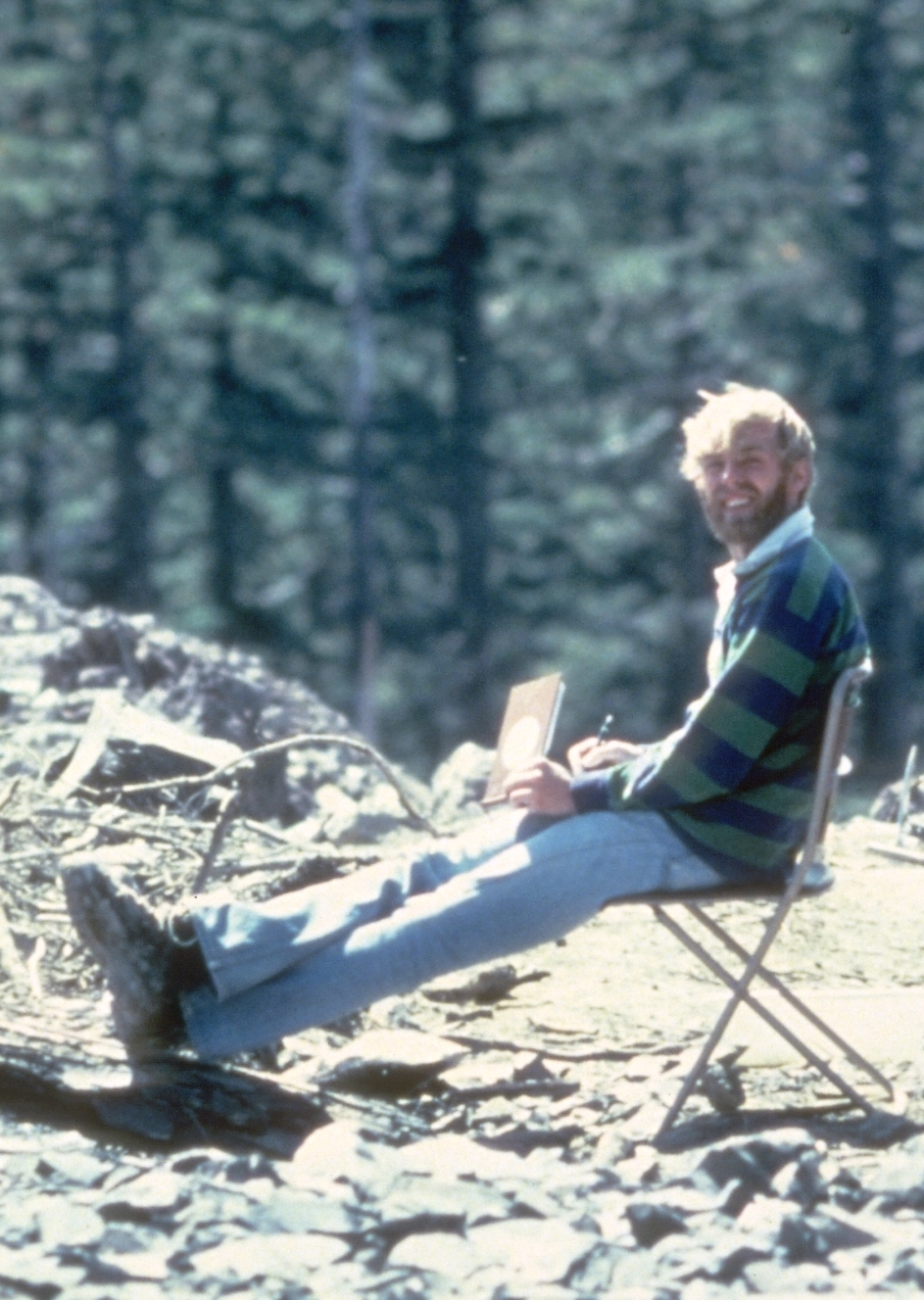
Photo of David A. Johnston taken 13.5 hours before his death.

"Vancouver! Vancouver! This is it!"
— David A. Johnston, American volcanologist (18 May 1980), reporting the 1980 eruption of Mount St. Helens from observation post

"At this very moment, I wish I were dead. I just can't cope anymore."
— Ian Curtis, English musician (18 May 1980) written on a note before hanging himself

"Iran is Iran." (repeatedly)
(".ایران ایران است")
— Mohammad Reza Pahlavi, last Shah of Iran (27 July 1980), before slipping into a coma

"I don't know where animators go when they die, but I guess there must be a lot of them. They could probably use a good director though."
— Tex Avery, American animator (26 August 1980), to an animator while watching a baseball game, according to Chuck Jones

"My life, my leather, my love goes to Bosco."
— Darby Crash, American musician (7 December 1980), writing a note to his friend David "Bosco" Davenport while dying of a heroin overdose

"I'm shot! I'm shot!" (Note: Lennon is rumoured to have additionally said, "Yes, I am" when asked by a police officer if he was John Lennon. This is however highly doubted and conflicted by other accounts. Reportedly, officer James Moran asked, "Are you John Lennon?" to which Lennon nodded and replied, "Yes." According to another account by officer Bill Gamble, Lennon nodded slightly and tried to speak, but could only manage to make a gurgling sound, and lost consciousness shortly thereafter.)
— John Lennon, English musician (8 December 1980), moments after being fatally shot by Mark David Chapman

"This is where the real fun starts."
— Ben Travers, English writer (18 December 1980)

"I don't hold any grudges. This is my doing. Sorry it happened."
— Steven Judy, American convicted murderer (9 March 1981), prior to execution by electrocution

"The day will dawn when all the people will have the desire for freedom ... And it's then that we'll see the rising of the moon."
— Bobby Sands, Provisional Irish Republican Army volunteer and British Member of Parliament (5 May 1981), final diary entry during hunger strike

"Money can't buy life."
— Bob Marley, Jamaican musician (11 May 1981)

"It's the most beautiful time in my life – and death." (Note: Saroyan also telephoned a final message to the Associated Press a month before his death: "Everybody has got to die, but I have always believed an exception would be made in my case. Now what?")
— William Saroyan, American author (18 May 1981)

"Mama!"
— Alfredo Rampi, Italian child (13 June 1981), moments before he died after falling in a well

"You know, it's people like you who put peace officers in hospitals or drive them to Pueblo."
— Frank McAteer, La Plata County, Colorado sergeant (4 July 1981), to suspect who resisted arrest; McAteer then collapsed from a heart attack

"Help me, someone please help me, I'm drowning."
— Natalie Wood, American actress (29 November 1981), crying for help from drowning

Air Florida Flight 90

- "Larry, we're going down, Larry!"
— First Officer Roger A. Pettit, first officer of Flight 90 (13 January 1982), was trying to make an attempt to climb due to freezing temperatures, upon just took off from Washington National Airport talking to the flight's Captain, Larry Wheaton

- "I know!"
— Captain Larry Wheaton, pilot of Flight 90 (13 January 1982), before it was impacted to Potomac River and crashing at 14th Street bridge, upon talking to the flight's first officer, Roger Pettit

"Just don't leave me alone."
— John Belushi, American actor and comedian (5 March 1982), before dying of drug overdose

"I can't face it anymore."
— Robert Armitage, GC, GM, Royal Navy officer (26 May 1982), prior to shooting and slightly wounding his wife and then killing himself

"It's not fair."
— Vincent Chin, Chinese-American draftsman (19 June 1982), just after being beaten with a baseball bat by Chrysler plant supervisor Ronald Ebens. Chin died four days later at Henry Ford Hospital.

"I've got to be crazy to do this shot. I should've asked for a double."
— Vic Morrow, American actor (23 July 1982), prior to being killed along with two child actors during filming in the Twilight Zone accident

"I am going."
— Sobhuza II, King of Swaziland, longest verifiably-reigning monarch in recorded history (21 August 1982), to his minister of health after halting a meeting

"Do I look all right? Give me my brush and my makeup."
— Ingrid Bergman, Swedish actress (29 August 1982), on hearing she had a visitor

"I believe this is going to be the greatest day of my life!"
— Lester Roloff, American fundamentalist Independent Baptist preacher and founder of teen homes (2 November 1982), prior to fatal plane crash

"Running out of air."
— Captain William S. Todd (11 January 1983), pilot of United Airlines Flight 2885, just before the plane crashed after takeoff from Detroit Metropolitan Airport

"I love you."
— Hergé, Belgian cartoonist (3 March 1983)

"Though God slay me, I will trust Him."
— Ninoy Aquino, Filipino politician (21 August 1983), moments just arrived in the Philippines after his 3-year self-exile along with his brother-in-law Ken Kashiwahara by his side, prior to his assassination at Manila International Airport

"Korean Air flight zero zero seven, we are experiencing rapid decompression descend to eleven thousand."
— Captain Chun Byung-in, pilot of Korean Air Lines Flight 007 (1 September 1983), as it was being shot by Soviet Air Defense Forces due to a navigational error when it entered onto a restricted airspace over Soviet Union

"Everything is fine, I'm ready to go."
— Ken Carter, Canadian stunt driver (5 September 1983), prior to fatal pond jump in rocket-powered car

"It's all been rather lovely."
— John Le Mesurier, English actor (15 November 1983)

"Well, the Lord is going to get another one."
— John Eldon Smith, American convicted murderer (15 December 1983), prior to execution by electrocution

"Kill me if you want, but stop bothering me!"
("Tue-moi si tu veux mais arrête de m'emmerder")
— Paul Gégauff, French director (24 December 1983), before being killed by his Norwegian wife.

"What is about to transpire in a few moments is wrong! However, we as human beings do make mistakes and errors. This execution is one of those wrongs yet doesn't mean our whole system of justice is wrong. Therefore, I would forgive all who have taken part in any way in my death. Also, to anyone I have offended in any way during my 39 years, I pray and ask your forgiveness, just as I forgive anyone who offended me in any way. And I pray and ask God's forgiveness for all of us respectively as human beings. To my loved ones, I extend my undying love. To those close to me, know in your hearts I love you one and all. God bless you all and may God's best blessings be always yours. Ronald C. O'Bryan. P.S. During my time here, I have been treated well by all T.D.C. personnel."
— Ronald Clark O'Bryan, American optician who killed his son with poisoned Halloween candy for life insurance money (31 March 1984), prior to execution by lethal injection

"Mother, I'm going to get my things and get out of this house. Father hates me and I'm never coming back." (Note: Gaye is rumoured to have additionally said, "I got what I wanted... I couldn't do it myself, so I had him do it... it's good, I ran my race, there's no more left in me." when asked by his brother Frankie why their father shot him, though this is disputed by others. Gaye, Frankie (2003). Marvin Gaye, My Brother. Backbeat Books. ISBN 0-87930-742-0.)
— Marvin Gaye, American singer (1 April 1984), moments before being shot to death by his father

"Thank you, love."
— Tommy Cooper, Welsh magician and comedian (15 April 1984), to his assistant before collapsing due to a heart attack in front of a television audience of 12 million. The assistant smiled and the audience laughed, mistakenly believing it was part of the act.

"I've got to get out, I'm out of control."
— Robert M. Bond, United States Air Force lieutenant general (26 April 1984), prior to failed ejection from Mikoyan-Gurevich MiG-23 jet fighter-bomber

"Oh, there's more. You're trying to hide from me you bastards!"
— James Huberty, perpetrator of the San Ysidro McDonald's massacre (18 July 1984), taunting employees hiding in the kitchen

"Mama— Mama— Mama."
— Truman Capote, American author (25 August 1984). He had been separated from his mother for several years during his childhood.

"Can you believe this crap?"
— Jon-Erik Hexum, American actor and model (18 October 1984), prior to dying by accidental self-inflicted blank cartridge gunshot to the head

"Let us pray that we may be free from fear [and] intimidation, but above all from the lust for retaliation and violence."
("Módlmy się, byśmy byli wolni od lęku, zastraszenia, ale przede wszystkim od żądzy odwetu i przemocy")
– Jerzy Popiełuszko, Polish Roman Catholic priest (19 October 1984), his well-known last word in public during the Bydgoszcz mass hours before his assassination.

"Namaste..."
— Indira Gandhi, Indian politician and stateswoman (31 October 1984), prior to her assassination

"I know that everybody has gone through a lot of pain, all the families connected, and I am sorry, and I want to thank everybody who have been supporting me all these six years."
— Velma Barfield, American serial killer (2 November 1984), right before her execution

"I am about to die for a murder that I did not commit, that someone else committed ... I love the Lord and hope that God takes me into his kingdom, and goodbye, mother."
— Roosevelt Green, Jr., American convicted murderer (9 January 1985), prior to execution by electrocution

"I'm ready. It feels good. It's a go."
— Karel Soucek, Czech-Canadian stuntman (20 January 1985), prior to fatal barrel drop from ceiling of Houston Astrodome

"I can't anymore."
— James Beard, American chef and cookbook author (23 January 1985), no longer able to speak

"Shit!"
— Rudolph Przydzial "Rudy" Price Jr. (2 August 1985), First Officer of Delta Air Lines Flight 191, reacting to the first impact of the Lockheed L-1011-385-1 TriStar.

"It's... the end!"
("ああ、おわった")
— Captain Masami Takahama (12 August 1985), pilot of Japan Air Lines Flight 123, just before the Boeing 747 crashed into a mountain

"I have a problem, I have a real problem."
— Art Scholl, American aerobatic pilot (16 September 1985), after his plane entered a flat inverted spin during filming of Top Gun

"No, I don't believe so."
— Rock Hudson, American actor (2 October 1985), when asked if he wanted a cup of coffee

"I am going to the inevitable."
— Philip Larkin, English poet and novelist (2 December 1985), to his nurse

"I'm bad, I'm nineteen."
— Phil Lynott, Irish singer, musician and songwriter (4 January 1986), dying at age 36 (Note: Fulton incorrectly gives Lynott's age at death as 46.)

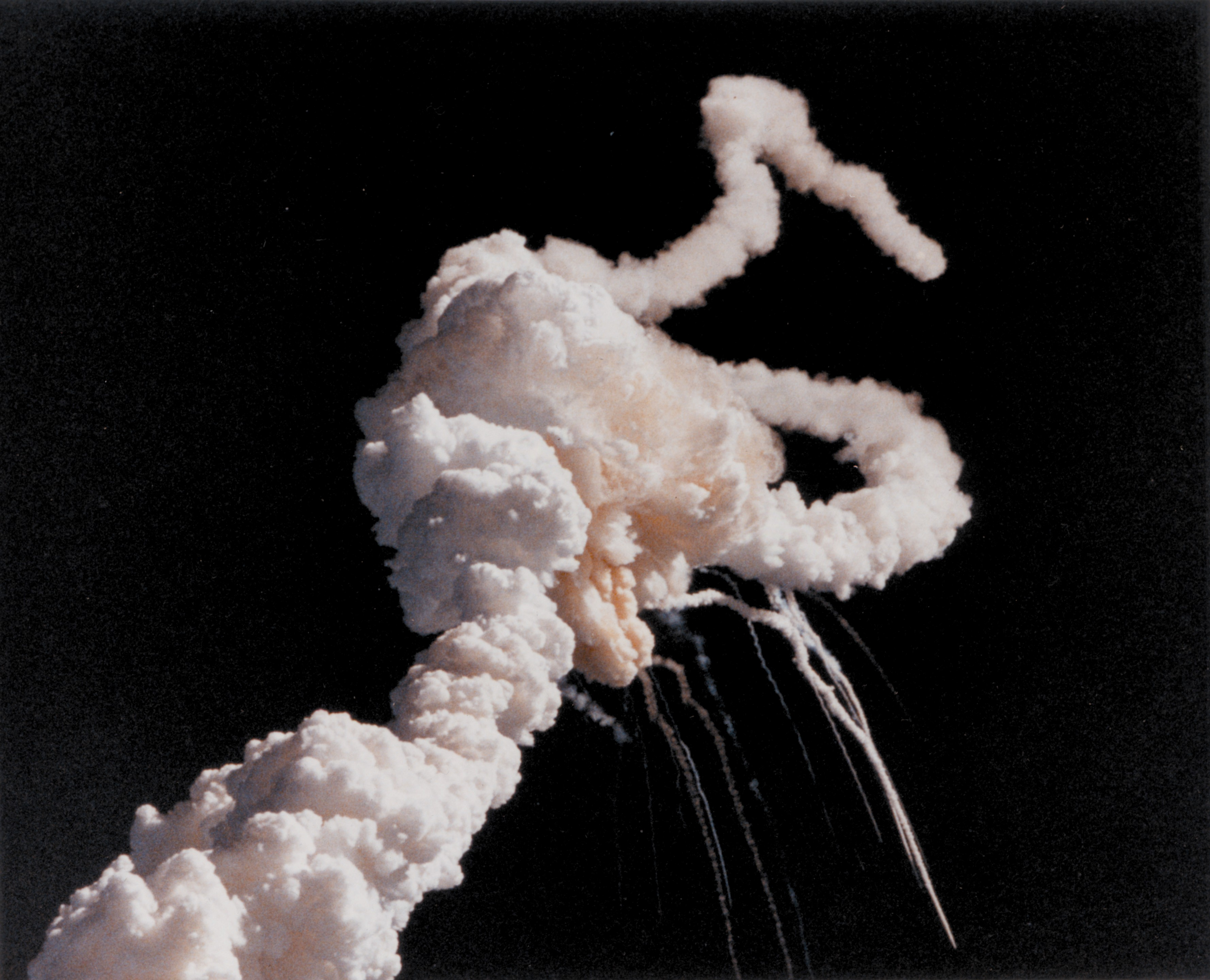
Destruction of Space Shuttle Challenger

Space Shuttle Challenger disaster

- "Roger, go at throttle up."
— Francis R. Scobee, American astronaut (28 January 1986), last recorded transmission of Space Shuttle Challenger to air-to-ground voice loop from capsule communicator Richard O. Covey, who was stationed in Houston

- "Uh oh."
— Michael J. Smith, American astronaut (28 January 1986), one minute and thirteen seconds after liftoff

"Don't worry. It's all right."
— Benny Goodman, American clarinetist (13 June 1986), to his friend Carol Smith, who discovered him pale and slumped on his couch after suffering an apparent heart attack

"My name is Jerome Bowden, and I would just like to state that my execution is about to be carried out. And I would like to thank the people at this institution for taking such good care of me in the way that they did. And I hope that by my execution being carried out, that it may bring some light to this thing that is wrong. And I would like to have a final prayer with Chaplain Lizzel if that is possible. Thank you very much."
— Jerome Bowden, American convicted murderer (24 June 1986), prior to execution by electrocution

"Freedom. Freedom at last, man. It's been a real good one."
— John William Rook, American convicted murderer (19 September 1986), prior to execution by lethal injection

"Maybe I will."
— Cliff Burton, American musician (27 September 1986), in a farewell exchange with Anthrax bassist Frank Bello the night before being killed in a tour bus accident in Sweden

"Every important thing a man searches for in his life, I found in Coach Lombardi. He made us men."
— Jerry Smith, American professional football player who was a tight end for the National Football League (15 October 1986), dying of AIDS

"Hit the water! Hit the water! Hit the water!"
— Jane Dornacker, American rock musician and traffic reporter (22 October 1986), prior to fatal crash of WNBC Radio helicopter into Hudson River

"I love you Barbara...don't worry."
— Cary Grant, English-American actor (29 November 1986), to his wife while being wheeled to intensive care following a stroke

"I love you too, honey. Good luck with your show."
— Desi Arnaz, Cuban-American bandleader, actor and film and television producer (2 December 1986), over the phone to his former wife, Lucille Ball

″I have nothing to say."
("저는 할 말이 없습니다")
— Park Jong-chul, South Korean student activist (14 January 1987), to the police of the Anti-communist Detached Office, who tortured him by water cure, to force him to confess the whereabouts of one of his fellow activists

"Don't, don't, don't, this will hurt someone!"
— R. Budd Dwyer, American politician (22 January 1987), to the reporters who tried to stop him from shooting himself during a press conference

"Yeah, country music."
— Buddy Rich, American jazz drummer and bandleader (2 April 1987), to a nurse who asked him, "Is there anything you can't take?" He then died during surgery

"I sure hope Salvador is doing alright!"
— Andy Warhol, American pop artist (22 February 1987), when notified that Salvador Dalí had been suffering from a mental breakdown

"People go to a university to look for alternatives. What they find is confusion. Like you. All confusion. What if everybody out there died except for us? We could re-create civilization, right here in this room. And I could be your leader!"
— Dick Shawn, American actor and comedian (17 April 1987), during a performance at University of California, San Diego. He collapsed on stage of a heart attack immediately afterwards, and laid there for several minutes as the audience initially believed it to be part of his act

"Life is unbearable for me. Forgive me."
("La vie m'est insupportable. Pardonnez moi")
— Dalida, Italian-French singer and actress (3 May 1987); writing her suicide note

"Goodnight! Goodbye! Bye, we perish!"
("Dobranoc! Do widzenia! Cześć, giniemy!")
— Zygmunt Pawlaczyk, the captain of LOT Polish Airlines Flight 5055 (9 May 1987), to air traffic control as the plane crashed into the ground

"I guess no one's going to call."
— Edward Earl Johnson, American convicted murderer (20 May 1987), prior to execution by gas chamber

"I have to go to City Hall tomorrow."
("내일 시청에 나가야 하는데…")
— Lee Han-yeol, South Korean student activist (9 June 1987), to his classmates at a demonstration before being shot by a tear gas container. Fell into a coma and never regained consciousness before his death on 5 July

"Yeah, I think I'd rather be fishing."
— Jimmy L. Glass, American convicted murderer (12 June 1987), prior to execution by electrocution (Note: Glass is incorrectly stated by Ward to have died by lethal injection.)

"I always knew what I was doing."
— Jackie Gleason, American actor, comedian, writer, composer, and conductor (24 June 1987)

"It's funny. I killed all those people, but I haven't the guts to blow my own brains out."
— Michael Ryan, perpetrator of the Hungerford massacre (19 August 1987), speaking to police shortly before committing suicide

"Kay."
— Captain Dawid Jacobus Uys, pilot of South African Airways Flight 295 (28 November 1987), just after declared an emergency following an in-flight fire before planning to head to Mauritius for an emergency attempt

"I'm bored."
— James Baldwin, American author and activist (1 December 1987)

"I feel great."
— Pete Maravich, American basketball player (5 January 1988), before dying of undiagnosed heart defect during pickup game

"I love you."
— Heather O'Rourke, American child actress (1 February 1988), to her mother, shortly before dying of septic shock

"I'd hate to die twice. It's so boring." (Note: Also reported as, "I'd hate to die twice. It's so boring.")
— Richard Feynman, American theoretical physicist and raconteur (15 February 1988)

"Oh, what's the bloody point?"
— Kenneth Williams, British actor and comedian (15 April 1988), the last words he wrote in his diary

"I want to offer again my most profound and heartfelt apologies to my victims' families. I am truly sorry. I have tried my best to empathize with their grief and devastation and I hope they come to know of my concerns and prayers for them."
— Arthur Gary Bishop, American convicted sex offender and serial killer (10 June 1988), prior to execution by lethal injection

"I know, I love you, bro."
— Hillel Slovak, Israeli-American musician (25 June 1988), in a phone conversation with his brother before dying of a heroin overdose

"Thank you, good day."
— Captain Mohsen Rezaian, pilot of Iran Air Flight 655 (3 July 1988), just as it was shot on a missile fired by USS Vincennes over Strait of Hormuz being mistaken as a fighter jet

"Oh, to die in Italy!"
— John Carradine, American actor (27 November 1988), dying in Milan, Italy

"Clipper one zero three at level three one zero, requesting oceanic clearance."
— Captain James MacQuarrie, pilot of Pan Am Flight 103 (21 December 1988), just entered Scottish airspace while turning to oceanic route across the Atlantic Ocean prior it was exploded by a terrorist bombing

"I think I'll go now."
— Oliver L. Austin, American ornithologist (31 December 1988), to his wife

"I believe that the image of walking through, these turbulent times live on people's hearts for a long time."
("激動の時代を踏まえた御姿は永く、人々の胸に生き続けると存じます。")
— Emperor Hirohito of Japan, (7 January 1989), a last message to Shoichi Fujimori, commissioner of Imperial Household Agency

"Where is my clock?"
("Dónde está mi reloj?")
— Salvador Dalí, Spanish surrealist painter (23 January 1989)

"Give my love to my family and friends."
— Ted Bundy, American serial killer (24 January 1989), prior to execution by electrocution

"I'm begging you, let me work!"
("お願いです、働かせてください！")
— Osamu Tezuka, Japanese cartoonist (9 February 1989), to a nurse who tried to take away his drawing equipment

"I did what I could."
— Edward Abbey, American author, essayist and environmental advocate (14 March 1989)

"It's too late. We can't win, they've gotten too powerful."
— Abbie Hoffman, American political and social activist (12 April 1989), in note written prior to phenobarbital overdose

"My Florida water."
— Lucille Ball, American actress, television producer and studio executive (26 April 1989), when asked if she wanted anything

"I hope and pray that all the new and reopened wounds will be healed quickly after my passing. My death is the Lord's will and I am now with my Lord and Savior Jesus Christ in Heaven."
— Aubrey Dennis Adams, Jr., American convicted child murderer (4 May 1989), prior to execution by electrocution

"Help me out of here. I've got to get out of here."
— Gilda Radner, American actress and comedian (20 May 1989), to her husband Gene Wilder before she went into a coma

"I love you, Noel."
— Mel Blanc, American voice actor and radio personality (10 July 1989), spoken in the voice of Yosemite Sam to his son Noel

"This isn't Hamlet, you know, it's not meant to go into the bloody ear."
— Laurence Olivier, English actor and director (11 July 1989), to a nurse when she spilled water on him while moistening his lips

"Why? Why?"
— Rebecca Schaeffer, American actress and model (18 July 1989), spoken to the neighbors after being shot at her apartment doorsteps by stalker Robert John Bardo

"No bloody doctors."
— R. D. Laing (23 August 1989), Scottish psychiatrist

"Sorry for saying fuck."
— Graham Chapman, English comedian, writer, actor, and author (4 October 1989), to a nurse who stuck a needle in his arm

"I'm so tired."
— Bette Davis, American actress (6 October 1989), spoken to a nurse before she died

"Ah, shit."
— Marc Lépine, Canadian perpetrator of the École Polytechnique massacre (6 December 1989), in which he killed fourteen women, before fatally shooting himself

"Long Live the Socialist Republic of Romania, independent and free."
("Trăiască Republica Socialistă România, independentă și liberă".)
— Nicolae Ceaușescu, Romanian communist politician, dictator and president of the Romanian Communist Party from 1965 to 1989 (25 December 1989), executed by firing squad along with his wife Elena

== 1990–2000 ==
"I don't want to lay down."
— Hank Gathers, American basketball player (4 March 1990), after collapsing during game

"See you later, I feel like I'm in good hands."
— Jim Henson, American puppeteer (16 May 1990), to his ex-wife Jane

"What is this?"
— Leonard Bernstein, American composer and conductor (14 October 1990), on receiving an injection

"Ow, fuck!"
— Roald Dahl, British author (23 November 1990), after a nurse pricked him with a needle

"Miss, I got what I really went for..."
— Jeremy Wade Delle, American high school student (8 January 1991), to his teacher shortly before committing suicide. Delle's suicide would inspire the song Jeremy by Pearl Jam.

"Okay air speed's alive. Engines are stabilized, power's set for departure. Fuel's even kind'a balanced. One hundred knots. V_{1}. Rotate. V_{2}. Plus ten. Positive rate. Watch out. Watch out. Watch out."
— David Reay, captain of Ryan International Airlines Flight 590 (17 February 1991), just before plane crashed on takeoff from Cleveland Hopkins International Airport

"Will it be an interesting experience? Will I find out what lies beyond the barrier? Why does it take so long to come?"
— Graham Greene, English novelist (3 April 1991), to his companion Yvonne Cloetta

"I am going to put myself to sleep now for a bit longer than usual. Call it Eternity."
— Jerzy Kosiński, Polish-American novelist (3 May 1991), in his suicide note

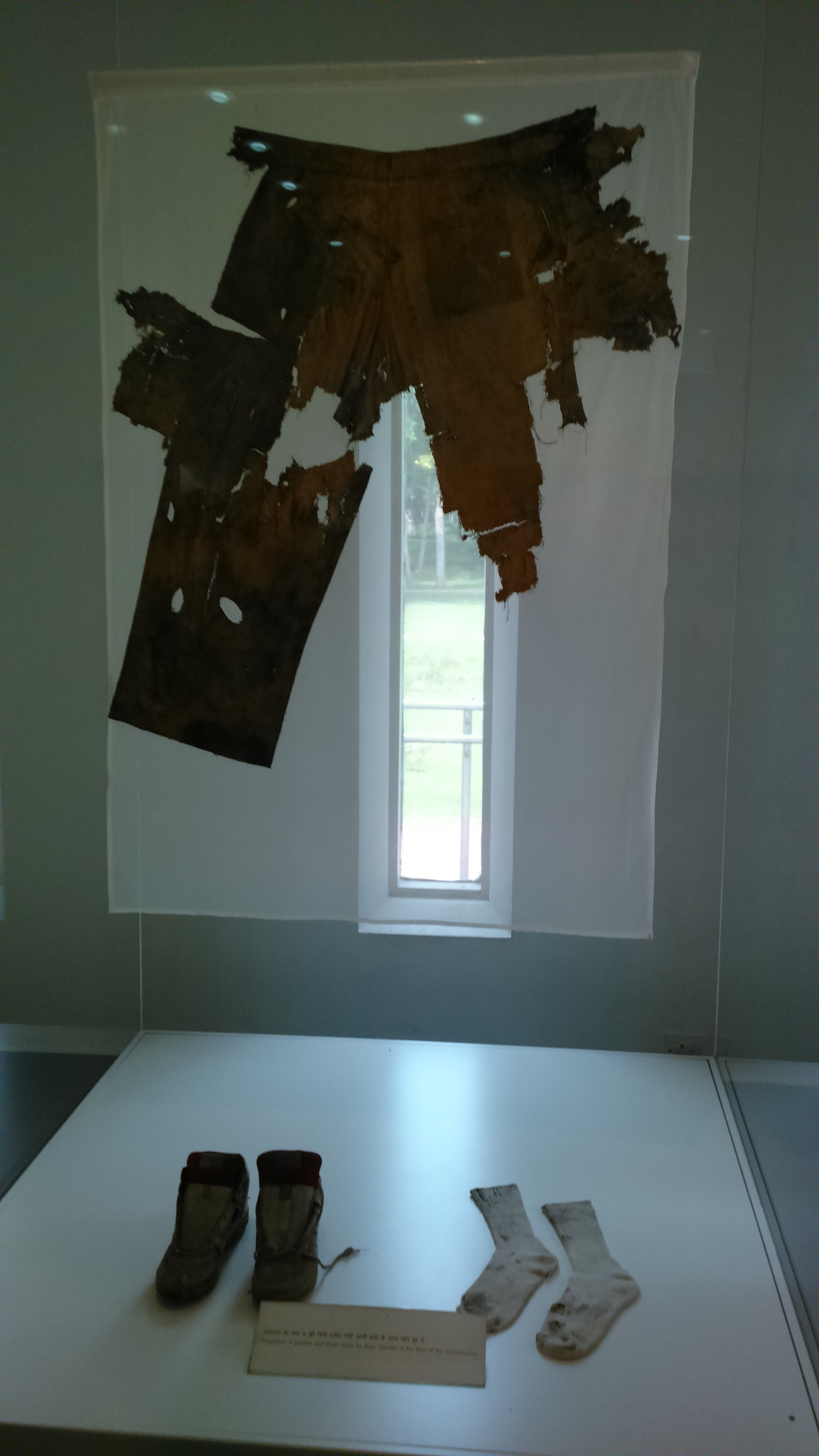
Remnants of clothing worn by Rajiv Gandhi during his assassination.

"Don't worry. Relax."
— Rajiv Gandhi, former Prime Minister of India (21 May 1991), spoken to a policewoman at his assassination

"Can you get a shot of this gun?"
— Harry Collinson, English planning officer (20 June 1991), asking for the cameraman to get a picture of Albert Dryden, who had brandished a revolver and shot him moments after

"You're right. It's time. I love you all."
— Michael Landon, American actor (1 July 1991), when one of his sons said it was time to move on

"This is a catastrophe."
("Это катастрофа.")
— Lazar Kaganovich, Soviet politician (25 July 1991), when he watched a television news report featuring Gorbachev and Yeltsin

"I'll let my lawyers talk for me. I'm ready to go."
— Donald Henry Gaskins, American serial killer (6 September 1991), prior to execution by electrocution

"Yes. I'm not going to die tomorrow."
— Dr. Seuss, American children's author, political cartoonist, illustrator, poet, animator, and filmmaker (24 September 1991)

"No, I'm going to kill more people."
— George Hennard, perpetrator of the Luby's shooting (16 October 1991), to first responders before committing suicide

"She's comin' on, boys, and she's comin' on strong."
— Captain Frank W. "Billy" Tyne Jr., American captain of the F/V Andrea Gail (28 October 1991), final radio transmission to Captain Linda Greenlaw of the F/V Hannah Boden before his ship capsized during the 1991 Perfect Storm.

"Lock and load. Let's do it, man."
— G. W. Green, American convicted murderer (11 November 1991), echoing Gary Gilmore prior to execution by lethal injection

"Thank you."
— Freddie Mercury, British lead vocalist of Queen (24 November 1991), to his assistant Peter Freestone, before he slipped into a coma and died shortly thereafter.

"Michelle did it."
— Laurie Show, American high school student (20 December 1991), after being stabbed by her two classmates at her home on the hands of her mother and died shortly thereafter

"I'd like to thank my family for loving me and taking care of me, and the rest of the world can kiss my ass."
— Johnny Frank Garrett, American convicted murderer (11 February 1992), prior to execution by lethal injection

"I just want everybody to know that I think the prosecutor and Bill Scott [a fellow inmate who testified against Ellis] are some sorry s.o.bs."
— Edward Ellis, American convicted murderer (3 March 1992), prior to execution by lethal injection

(Declined to make a final statement, but signaled the executioner to get started.)
— Donald Harding, American convicted murderer (6 April 1992). His asphyxiation in the gas chamber took 11 minutes before death was finally confirmed, and Harding spent his last moments cursing Arizona's state attorney general Grant Woods and giving him the middle finger.

"I don't want to die; I don't want to die. But why? Okay, okay, okay." (Note: A friend who was with Kinison at the time of the fatal crash later recalled, "Whatever voice was talking to him gave him the right answer and he just relaxed with it.")
— Sam Kinison, American comic (10 April 1992), spoken after a fatal car accident caused by a teen who had been drinking alcohol.

"You can be a king or a street sweeper, but everyone dances with the Grim Reaper." (Note: This is a misquotation of a line in the 1991 film Bill & Ted's Bogus Journey, which was in turn a paraphrase of the German danse macabre caption Wer war der Thor, wer der Weiser, wer der Bettler oder Kaiser? Ob arm, ob reich, im Tode gleich ("Who was the fool; who [was] the sage; who [was] the beggar or [the] Emperor? Whether rich or poor, in death [all are] equal.").)
— Robert Alton Harris, American kidnapper and murderer (21 April 1992), prior to execution by gas chamber

"An innocent man is going to be murdered tonight. When my innocence is proven, I hope America will realize the injustice of the death penalty as all other civilized countries have. My last words are to the woman I love. Love is eternal. My love for you will last forever. I love you, Sharon."
— Roger Keith Coleman, American rapist and murderer (20 May 1992), prior to execution by electrocution. In 2006, Coleman was found to be truly guilty due to DNA evidence.

"I HAVE HAD A HAPPY LIFE AND THANK THE LORD. GOODBYE AND MAY GOD BLESS ALL!"
— Chris McCandless, American hiker (18 August 1992), final note written before dying of starvation

"Going down, [Flight] 1862, going down, going down, copied, going down."
— Arnon Ohad, First Officer of El Al Flight 1862 (4 October 1992), last ATC transmission before the plane crashed into a residential complex in Amsterdam.

"I'm dying. Tell Sue I'm sorry and that I love her."
— Chris Rouse, American scuba diver (12 October 1992), dying from decompression sickness after wreck dive aboard German submarine U-869

"I am innocent, innocent, innocent. Make no mistake about this. I owe society nothing. Continue the struggle for human rights, helping those who are innocent, especially Mr. Graham. I am an innocent man, and something very wrong is taking place tonight. May God bless you all. I am ready."
— Leonel Torres Herrera, American convicted police murderer (12 May 1993), prior to execution by lethal injection

"Well, I just have to do this, and everything will be fine. Kathy, it's not your fault, so don't worry. I love you. OK, I just need to pull this little trigger... Whoa. Well, I guess I just have to wait."
— Hervé Villechaize, French-American actor (4 September 1993), in a tape where he committed suicide over chronic pain relating to his dwarfism. presumably when he pulled the trigger, the gun did not go off instantly.

"No paparazzi, I want anonymity."
— River Phoenix, American actor, musician, and activist (31 October 1993)

"I want the world to be filled with white fluffy duckies."
— Derek Jarman, English film director, stage designer and author (19 February 1994)

"I don't have the passion anymore, and so remember, it's better to burn out than to fade away. Peace, love, empathy. Kurt Cobain. Frances and Courtney, I'll be at your altar. Please keep going Courtney, for Frances. For her life, which will be so much happier without me. I LOVE YOU, I LOVE YOU!"
— Kurt Cobain, American musician (5 April 1994), closing his suicide note

"Help."
— Richard Nixon, president of the United States (22 April 1994), to a housekeeper while suffering a stroke

"The car seems OK ..."
— Ayrton Senna, Brazilian Formula One driver (1 May 1994), prior to fatal crash at 1994 San Marino Grand Prix

"Kiss my ass."
— John Wayne Gacy, American serial killer and sex offender (10 May 1994), prior to execution by lethal injection

"Adios."
— John Thanos, American murderer (17 May 1994), prior to execution by lethal injection

"Don't cry for me. I'm going to be with your father now."
— Jacqueline Kennedy Onassis, former First Lady of the United States (19 May 1994), to her daughter Caroline and son John

"I'm really, really sorry. The pain of life overrides the joy to the point that joy does not exist... depressed... without phone... money for rent... money for child support... money for debts... money!!!... I am haunted by the vivid memories of killings & corpses & anger & pain... of starving or wounded children, of trigger-happy madmen, often police, of killer executioners... I have gone to join Ken if I am that lucky."
— Kevin Carter, South African photojournalist (27 July 1994), in his suicide note, before killing himself from carbon monoxide poisoning

"Are you sure?"
— Sonja Davis, American stunt performer (November 1994), calling down to stunt coordinator prior to fatal fall onto airbag on the set of Vampire in Brooklyn

"Give me a fucking pre-med you fuckers, I'm a personal friend of Sir Lancelot Spratt."
— Vivian MacKerrell, British actor (2 March 1995)

"Now, I'm in the biggest fight of my life and it ain't easy. But I want to say much love to those who have been down with me and thanks for all your support. Just remember, It's your real time and your real life."
— Eric "Eazy-E" Wright, American rapper who propelled West Coast rap and gangsta rap by leading the group N.W.A and its label, Ruthless Records (16 March 1995), written as part of his final message to his fans while dying of AIDS. He slipped into a coma not long afterwards and died on March 26.

"I did not get my Spaghetti-Os. I got spaghetti. I want the press to know this."
— Thomas J. Grasso, American double murderer (20 March 1995), prior to execution by lethal injection

"Yolanda...158."
— Selena Quintanilla-Pérez, American singer (31 March 1995), explaining her murderer's name and room number to the hotel staff shortly after being shot by Yolanda Saldívar

"I'm the happiest man in the world! I'm not afraid to die! I'm not crazy! I'm going to be reaching that white house tonight!"
— Sylvester Lewis Adams, American convicted murderer (18 August 1995), prior to execution by lethal injection

"Oh, come on."
— Kingsley Amis, English novelist and poet (22 October 1995)

"This rally must send a message to the Israeli people, to the Jewish people around the world, to the many people in the Arab world, and indeed to the entire world, that the Israeli people want peace, support peace. For this, I thank you."
— Yitzhak Rabin, Israeli Prime Minister (4 November 1995), prior to his assassination

"Okay. Report Tuluá, twenty-one miles and five thousand feet, American nine six five."
— Captain Nicholas Tafuri, pilot of American Airlines Flight 965 (20 December 1995), on a last recorded transmission to air traffic controllers in Colombia, it was due to land at Alfonso Bonilla Aragón International Airport in Cali prior to the crash

"You only live so long."
— Richard Versalle, American operatic tenor (5 January 1996), performing in The Makropulos Case at the Metropolitan Opera before dying on stage

"Mom, do you hear the rain? Do you hear the rain? Mom, I just want to take off in the plane."
— Jessica Dubroff, seven-year-old American pilot trainee (11 April 1996), before dying in an aircraft crash. Pilots at the airport later testified that the weather was unsuitable for flight.

"No, not here!"
— Anthony Nightingale, victim of the Port Arthur massacre (28 April 1996), reacting to Martin Bryant pointing his weapon at him

"I love you. Sleep well, my sweetheart. Please don't worry too much."
— Rob Hall, New Zealand mountaineer (11 May 1996), speaking to his wife by satellite phone before dying on Mount Everest

"One four zero."
— First officer Richard Hazen, pilot of ValuJet Flight 592 (11 May 1996), talking to air traffic controllers following a fire onboard, attempted to return to Miami International Airport

"Why? Why not?" (Note: Also reported as, "Why not? Why not? Why not? Why not? Yeah.")
— Timothy Leary, American psychologist and writer (31 May 1996)

"Power's set."
— Flight engineer Richard Campbell, pilot of TWA Flight 800 (17 July 1996), as it was cruising over Long Island prior to breaking up

"This is for you!" (Note: What exactly López said has been disputed. The ABC report on him cites his last statement as "This is for you!", but other sources cite it as "Victory!")
— Ricardo López, Uruguayan-born American pest controller (12 September 1996), before committing suicide with a gun after he mailed a bomb to Icelandic musician Björk, attempting to kill her

"Fuck you."
— Tupac "2Pac" Shakur, American rapper (13 September 1996), to the first responder police officer at the scene of his murder

"No, I'm not!"
— Tiny Tim, American musician, ukulele player and musical archivist (30 November 1996), to his wife after she asked if he was alright, right before collapsing on stage during a performance of "Tip-Toe Through the Tulips".

"Goodbye, Ann."
— Carl Sagan, American astronomer and scientist (20 December 1996), while talking to his wife Ann on a hospital bed

"Toodle-oo!"
— Allen Ginsberg, American poet and writer (5 April 1997)

"Thank the Lord for the past 14 years that have allowed me to grow as a man. To J.D.'s family, I am sorry for the suffering you have gone through the past 14 years. I hope you can get some peace tonight. To my family, I am happy to be going home to Jesus. Sweet Jesus, here I come. Take me home. I am going your way."
— Kenneth Edward Gentry, American criminal (16 April 1997), prior to execution by lethal injection

"Forgive me, but I don't want to live anymore. The pain is too bad. There's no point in trying to prolong this agony."
— Brian Keith, American actor (24 June 1997), to his wife Victoria

"I'm going to be with Gloria now."
— James Stewart, American actor (2 July 1997), referring to his late wife

"My God, what's happened?"
— Diana, former princess consort of Charles, Prince of Wales (31 August 1997), shortly after being fatally injured in a car accident

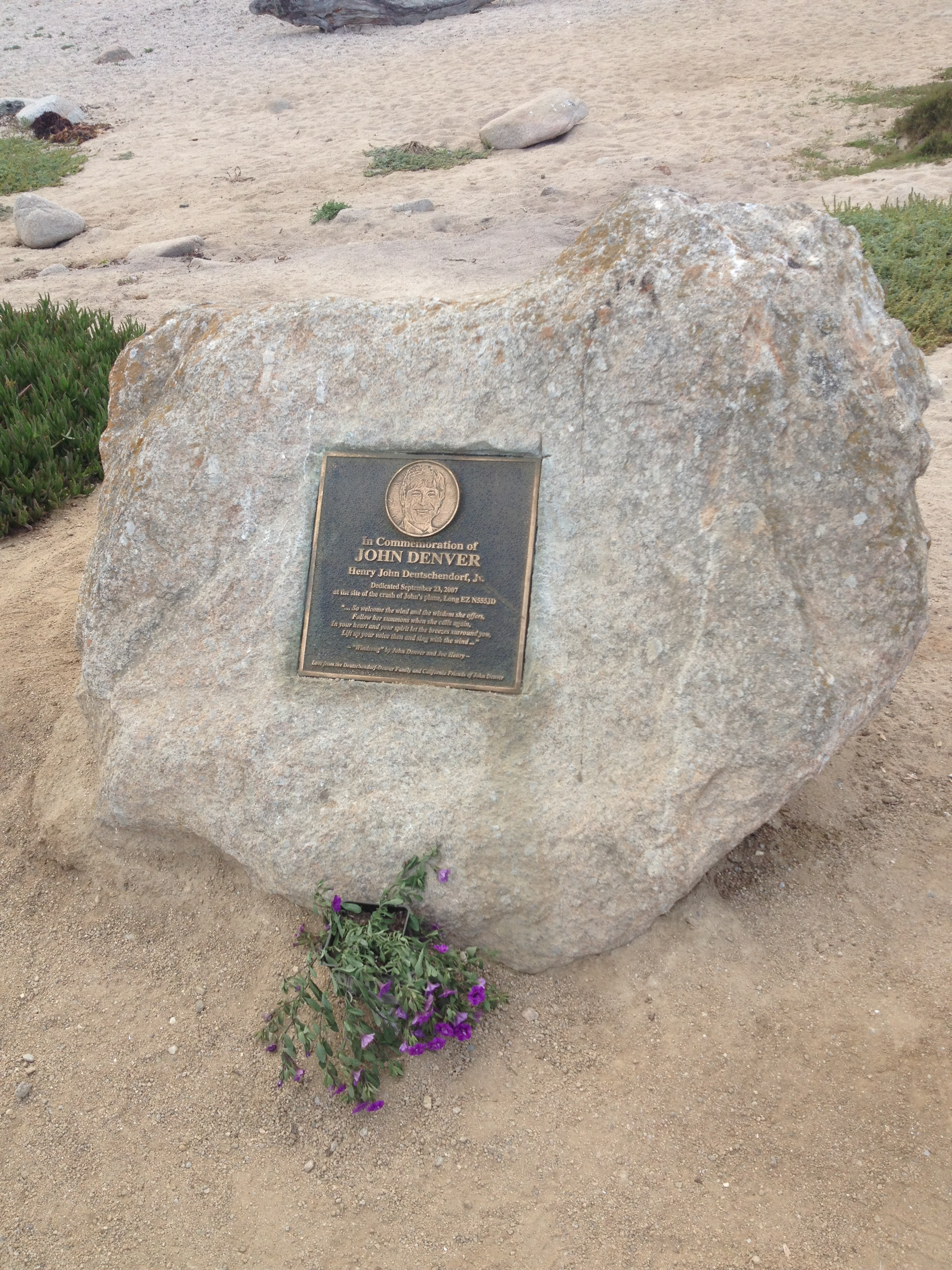
Plaque marking location of John Denver's plane crash in Pacific Grove, California

"Do you have it now?"
— John Denver, American singer-songwriter (12 October 1997), asking if he had transmitted a four-digit code properly prior to crash of his experimental Rutan Long-EZ aircraft

"And where do you come from?"
— Isaiah Berlin, Russian-British philosopher (5 November 1997), to a nurse

"Please don't leave me."
— Chris Farley, American actor and comedian (18 December 1997), to a prostitute, leaving his Chicago apartment

"Shoot, shoot, stop now!"
— Kyle Dinkheller, American sheriff's deputy (12 January 1998), while being shot to death by Andrew Howard Brannan

"[Mo]nday Jan 26; 1998 08am. To anyone can help us: We have been abandoned on A[gin]court Reef by MV Outer Edge 25 Jan 98 3pm. Please help us to rescue us before we die. Help!!!"
— Tom Lonergan, American scuba diver (26 January 1998), message written on dive slate. Lonergan and his wife Eileen disappeared in the Coral Sea off northeast Australia after being unintentionally abandoned by their dive boat.

"Yes sir, I would like to say to all of you-the Thornton Family and Jerry Dean's family that I am so sorry. I hope God will give you peace with this. Baby, I love you. Ron, give Peggy a hug for me. Everybody has been so good to me. I love all of you very much. I am going to be face to face with Jesus now. Warden Baggett, thank all of you so much. You have been so good to me. I love all of you very much. I will see you all when you get there. I will wait for you."
— Karla Faye Tucker, American double murderer who converted to Christianity in prison (3 February 1998), prior to execution by lethal injection

"Oh shit!"
— Cozy Powell, English drummer (5 April 1998), to his girlfriend on the phone shortly before he was killed in a car crash

"The act of taking my own life is not something I am doing without a lot of thought. I don't believe that people should take their own lives without deep and thoughtful reflection over a considerable period of time. I do believe strongly, however, that the right to do so is one of the most fundamental rights that anyone in a free society should have. For me much of the world makes no sense, but my feelings about what I am doing ring loud and clear to an inner ear and a place where there is no self, only calm. Love always, Wendy."
— Wendy O. Williams, American singer, songwriter and actress (6 April 1998); one of her suicide notes

"I'm a dead man, see ya."
— Daniel V. Jones, American citizen (30 April 1998); on his last home video before committing suicide on live television

"I'm losing it."
— Frank Sinatra, American singer and actor (14 May 1998)

"I'm an American. Please don't leave me."
— Francys Arsentiev, American mountaineer (24 May 1998), to British climber Ian Woodall while dying during descent from Mount Everest

"I'm going out for the night. I'll be back—Phil. Love you."
— Phil Hartman, Canadian-American actor, comedian, screenwriter, and graphic designer (28 May 1998), a note that he had left behind for his wife hours before she would murder him

"And we are declaring emergency now, Swissair one eleven!"
— Captain Urs Zimmermann, pilot of Swissair Flight 111 (2 September 1998), as it was diverted to Halifax, Nova Scotia after declaring an emergency following electrical fire before losing control and rapid descent

"Don't mess with my money."
— Lowell Fulson, American blues guitarist and songwriter (7 March 1999)

"I'll finally get to see Marilyn." (Note: DiMaggio's final words according to his lawyer, Morris Engelberg, an account challenged by Dom DiMaggio and a hospice worker.)
— Joe DiMaggio, American baseball player (8 March 1999)

"Oooh, the Godfather, just saying his name makes my blue blood boil. OHHH! The Godfather, my arch nemesis, he represents everything that's wrong with the WWF. But fear not, because I, the Blue Blazer, will always triumph over evil doers, and you know why, because I always take my vitamins, say my prayers, and drink my milk, WHOOO!"
— Owen Hart, Canadian-American professional wrestler (23 May 1999), being interviewed on camera prior to fatal fall into ring at Over the Edge (1999)

"I rely on God."
(".توكلت على الله")
— Gameel Al-Batouti, pilot of EgyptAir Flight 990 (31 October 1999), final air control transmission from the airplane before spiraling down to the Atlantic Ocean

"You crawl out of your mother's womb, you crawl across open country under fire, and drop into your grave."
— Quentin Crisp, English writer, racounteur and actor (21 November 1999)

"Five zula [sic] alpha just had a midair. Both planes are going down in the, ah, one mile to the, ah, two miles to the west of the power plant."
— Bob Collins, American radio disc jockey (8 February 2000), final radio transmission during 2000 Zion mid-air collision

"Keep going, finish your book."
— Charles M. Schulz, American cartoonist (12 February 2000), to his son Monte

"I love my family. I love all my friends and my rabbi"
— Terry Melvin Sims, American convicted murderer (23 February 2000), before his execution

"I just want you to know from the bottom of my heart that I am truly sorry. I mean it. I'm not saying it."
— Timothy Gribble, American serial killer (15 March 2000), before his execution

"No."
— Candace Newmaker, American child murder victim (18 April 2000), when asked if she wanted to be "reborn" by her murderers

"There is no way words can express how sorry I am for taking the lives of my babies. Now I can be with my babies, as I always intended. I love you my babies." (Note: Also reported as, "No words can express just how sorry I am for taking the lives of my babies. No way I can make up for or take away the pain I have caused everyone who knew and loved them. I love you, my babies.")
— Christina Marie Riggs, American murderer (2 May 2000), prior to execution by lethal injection for killing her two young children

"I want to tell you, Keith, and the Ponsano family that I always regretted what I've done. It was my own doing. After this is over with, I hope you can find the peace to move on."
— Feltus Taylor, American convicted murderer (6 June 2000), right before his execution

"Our destiny is to build a better future for our countries, a safe future for our children. We have to give them something better than we inherited."
— Hafez al-Assad, President of Syria (10 June 2000), to Émile Lahoud, the President of Lebanon

"No time, no."

("Pas le temps, non.")

— Christian Marty (25 July 2000); pilot of Air France Flight 4590, shortly before crashing

"It seems that there are no chances. Maybe 10 or 20 percent."
— Dmitry Kolesnikov, Russian Navy officer (12 August 2000); final note written before dying aboard sunken submarine Kursk

"Somebody needs to kill my trial attorney."
— George Bernard Harris, American armed robber and murderer (13 September 2000), prior to execution by lethal injection

"Sant Ajaib Singh. That's it"
— Daniel Hittle, American serial killer (6 December 2000), prior to his execution
