= Sinking of RMS Lusitania =

World War I maritime disaster

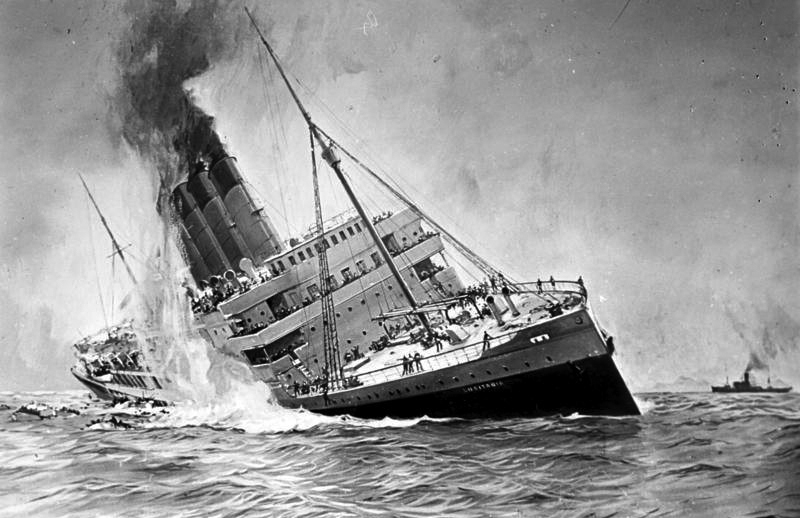
- Painting of the sinking, from the German Federal Archives

- Sinking of RMS Lusitania on a map of present-day Ireland
- Date: 7 May 1915; 111 years ago
- Time: 14:10 – 14:28
- Location: Celtic Sea, near Old Head of Kinsale, Ireland; 51°25′N 8°33′W
- Type: Maritime disaster
- Cause: Torpedoed by German U-boat U-20
- Participants: Lusitania crew and passengers; U-20 crew
- Outcome: Turned international opinion against Germany; Temporary end of unrestricted submarine warfare
- Deaths: 1,197 of the 1,960 people aboard killed

RMS Lusitania was a British-registered ocean liner that was torpedoed by an Imperial German Navy U-boat during the First World War on 7 May 1915, about 11 nautical miles (20 kilometres; 13 miles) off the Old Head of Kinsale, Ireland (then part of the United Kingdom). The attack took place in the declared maritime war-zone around the United Kingdom, three months after unrestricted submarine warfare against the ships of the United Kingdom had been announced by Germany following the Allied powers' implementation of a naval blockade against it and the other Central Powers.

The passengers had been notified before departing New York of the general danger of voyaging into the area in a British ship, but the attack itself came without warning. From a submerged position 700 metres (2,300 ft) to starboard, U-20 commanded by Kapitänleutnant Walther Schwieger launched a single torpedo at the Cunard liner. After the torpedo struck, a second explosion occurred inside the ship, which then sank in only 18 minutes. U-20's mission was to torpedo warships and liners in Lusitania's area of operation. In the end, there were only 763 survivors (39%) out of the 1,960 passengers, crew and stowaways aboard, and about 128 of the dead were American citizens. The sinking turned public opinion in many countries against Germany. It also contributed to the American entry into the war almost two years later, on 6 April 1917; images of the stricken liner were used heavily in US propaganda and military recruiting campaigns.

The contemporary investigations in both the United Kingdom, including a wreck commission called by the Board of Trade, and the United States into the precise causes of the ship's loss were obstructed by the needs of wartime secrecy and a propaganda campaign to ensure all blame fell upon Germany. At the time of her sinking, the primarily passenger-carrying vessel had in her hold around 173 tons of war supplies, comprising 4.2 million rounds of rifle ammunition, almost 5,000 shrapnel-filled artillery shell casings and 3,240 brass percussion fuses. Debates on the legitimacy of the way she was sunk raged back and forth throughout the war and beyond. Some writers argue that the British government, with Winston Churchill's involvement, deliberately put the Lusitania at risk to provoke a German attack and draw the United States into the war. This theory is generally rejected by mainstream historians, who characterise the sinking as mainly a combination of British mistakes and misfortune, with claims to the contrary characterized by implausible theories, lack of evidence, and in some cases fabricated sources.

== Background ==
When Lusitania was built, her construction and operating expenses were subsidized by the British government, with the provision that she could be converted to an armed merchant cruiser (AMC) if need be. Pillars and supports were included in her design to allow the emplacement of 12 6-inch guns, and she was listed as a "Royal Naval Reserve Merchant Vessel". In the 1914 edition of Jane's All the World's Fighting Ships, its silhouette was listed for identification reasons as a civilian liner, together with Mauretania and all liners of all nations capable of over 18 knots. Brassey's 1914 The Naval Annual categorised her as a "Royal Naval Reserved Merchant Cruiser".

At the outbreak of the First World War, the British Admiralty considered her for requisition as an AMC. However the Admiralty then cancelled their decision and decided not to use her as an AMC after all; large liners such as Lusitania consumed enormous quantities of coal (910 tons/day, or 37.6 tons/hour) and became a serious drain on the Admiralty's fuel reserves, so express liners were deemed inappropriate for the role when smaller cruisers would do. They were also very distinctive, so smaller liners were used as transports instead.

At the outbreak of hostilities, fears for the safety of Lusitania and other great liners ran high. During the ship's first wartime eastbound crossing, she was painted a flat grey to mask her identity and make her more difficult to detect visually. When it turned out that the German Navy was kept in check by the Royal Navy, and their commerce threat almost entirely evaporated, it very soon appeared that the Atlantic was safe for large passenger liners like Lusitania, if the bookings justified the expense of keeping them in service.

Many of the large liners were laid up over the autumn and winter of 1914–1915, in part due to falling demand for passenger travel across the Atlantic, and in part to protect them from naval mines or other dangers. Among the most recognizable of these liners, some were eventually used as troop transports or hospital ships. Although bookings were by no means strong during that autumn and winter of 1914–15, demand was sufficient to keep her in civilian service. Economizing measures were taken, however. One of these was the shutting down of her No. 4 boiler room to conserve coal and crew costs; this reduced her maximum speed from over 25 to 21 knots (46 to 39 km/h; 29 to 24 mph). Even so, she was the fastest first-class passenger liner left in commercial service.

With apparent dangers evaporating, the ship's disguised paint scheme was also dropped and she was returned to her civilian colours. Her name was picked out in gilt, her funnels repainted in their usual Cunard livery, and her superstructure painted white again. One alteration was the addition of a bronze/gold coloured band around the base of the superstructure just above the black paint.

=== 1915 ===
The British established a naval blockade of Germany on the outbreak of war in August 1914, issuing a comprehensive list of contraband that grew to include even foodstuffs. In early November 1914 Britain declared the North Sea to be a "military area", with any ships entering the North Sea doing so at their own risk unless they obeyed specific Royal Navy instructions.

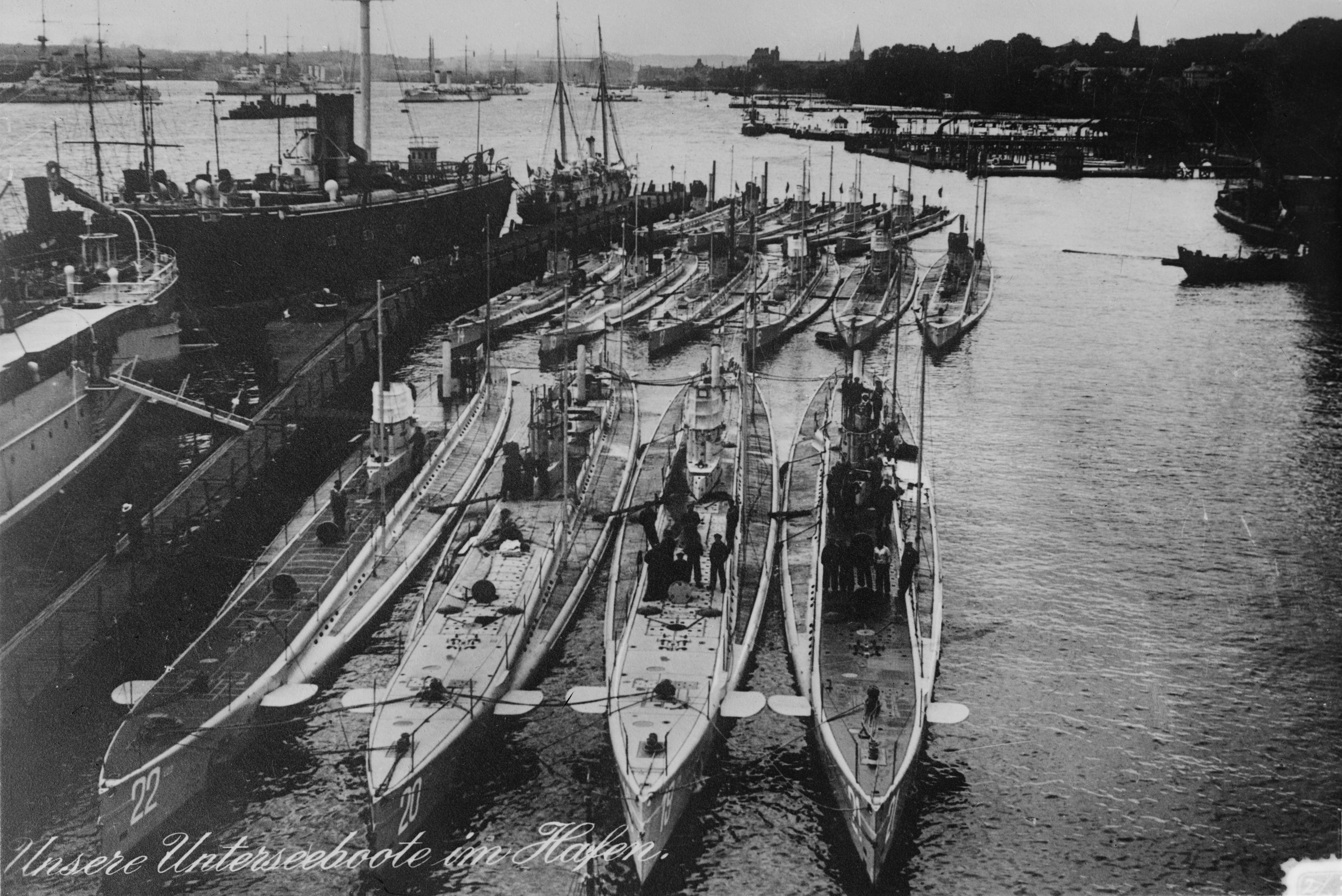
The German pre-war submarine fleet at harbour in Kiel. U-20 is second from left

By early 1915, a new threat to British shipping began to materialise: U-boats (submarines). At first, the Germans used them only to attack naval vessels, achieving only occasional—but sometimes spectacular—success. U-boats then began to attack merchant vessels at times, although almost always in accordance with the old cruiser rules. Desperate to gain an advantage on the Atlantic and define a role for the Navy, and heavily overestimating the effectiveness of the new weapon, the Admiralty under Hugo von Pohl decided to step up its submarine campaign. On 4 February 1915, he declared the seas around the British Isles a war zone: from 18 February, Allied ships in the area could be sunk without warning. This was not wholly unrestricted submarine warfare, since efforts would be taken to avoid sinking neutral ships. However, the German Imperial Admiralty Staff secretly directed captains to target passenger craft, as it was thought that this would deter other shipping. As Germany started the campaign with only 21 submarines, many of which were not operational, many did not take the threat seriously. The US government warned the Germans that they would face "strict accountability" for any American deaths as a result of the campaign.

The reaction to the announcement by those on the Lusitania was characterised by confusion. At sea en route to Liverpool at the time of the announcement, American passengers urged Captain Daniel Dow to fly the US flag to dissuade attack. This led to a storm of controversy from the American authorities and Germany.

On her next voyage, Lusitania was scheduled to arrive in Liverpool on 6 March 1915. The Admiralty issued her specific instructions on how to avoid submarines. Despite a severe shortage of destroyers, Admiral Henry Oliver ordered HMS Louis and Laverock to escort Lusitania, and took the further precaution of sending the Q ship Lyons to patrol Liverpool Bay. One of the destroyers' commanders attempted to discover the whereabouts of Lusitania by telephoning Cunard, who refused to give out any information and referred him to the Admiralty. At sea, the ships contacted Lusitania by radio, but did not have the codes used to communicate with merchant ships and thus communicated in the clear; as doing this would put his ship under substantial risk, Captain Dow gave a false position, significantly far away from his actual position, leaving the warships unable to locate him. The Lusitania continued to Liverpool unescorted.

Some alterations were made to Lusitania and her operation in view of the threat. She was ordered not to fly any flags in the war zone; a number of warnings, plus advice, were sent to the ship's commander to help him decide how to best protect his ship against the new threat and it also seems that her funnels were most likely painted a dark grey to help make her less visible to enemy submarines. There was no hope of disguising her actual identity, since her profile was so well known, and no attempt was made to paint out the ship's name at the prow.

Unknown to all, the submarine war was about to get more dangerous. On 28 March, during the Thrasher incident, a German submarine stopped the British passenger ship Falaba on the surface. Eyewitnesses reported the submarine gave the ship only around ten minutes to evacuate before torpedoing the vessel, resulting in the first American death of the war. On 1 April, Admiral Gustav Bachmann, head of the German Admiralty Staff, sent a memo to Kaiser Wilhelm II. This detailed the woefully small number of ships sunk so far, and Bachmann argued this showed that the submarine war could only really be effective if U-boats were completely unrestricted, and so could attack without determining the identity and nationality of ships. With the encouragement of Tirpitz, the Kaiser sent out secret instructions on 2 April to discourage the common tactic of surfacing to attack vessels and emphasized the danger of doing so. This created what historian Arthur Link terms "an operational twilight zone" in which mistakes would be more easily made. There was no improvement in the number of ships sunk following this instruction, but 6 out of the 17 vessels sunk in April were neutral. The Germans convinced themselves that Americans were toothless. "The policy of the American Government is dominated by the one thought of not becoming involved in any complications whatsoever. 'We want to stay out of everything' is the single rule." In late April/early May there were German attacks on two additional American vessels, Cushing and Gulflight, the former (29 April) an air attack that caused no loss of life, and the latter (1 May) a submarine attack on a tanker where three died. President Woodrow Wilson had not made a formal response to any of these incidents before events overtook him.

Captain Dow, apparently stressed by operating in the war zone, left the ship; Cunard later explained that he was "tired and really ill." He was replaced with a new commander, Captain William Thomas Turner, who had commanded Lusitania, Mauretania, and Aquitania before the war. On 17 April 1915, Lusitania left Liverpool on her 201st transatlantic voyage, arriving at New York on 24 April.

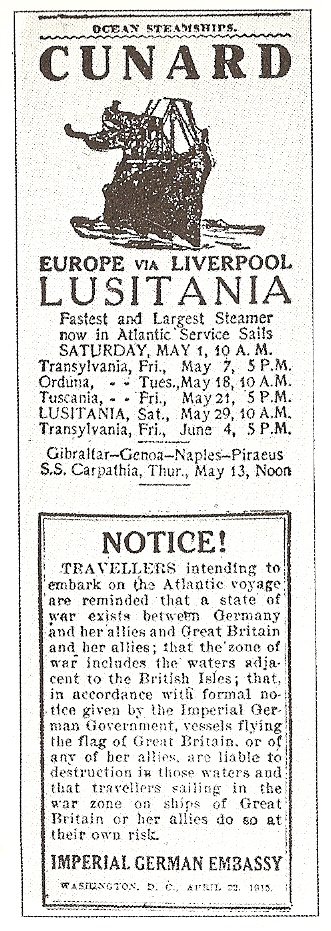
The official warning issued by the Imperial German Embassy about travel to the UK, appearing on 30 April next to the Lusitania voyage advertisement

In mid-April, German ambassador Johann Heinrich von Bernstorff, who had long had concerns about the legality of the February submarine campaign, and believing the Americans to be underestimating the dangers, consulted a group of representatives of other German administrative departments. He decided to issue a general warning to the American press. This notice was to appear in 50 American newspapers, including those in New York:

Notice!
Travellers intending to embark on the Atlantic voyage are reminded that a state of war exists between Germany and her allies and Great Britain and her allies; that the zone of war includes the waters adjacent to the British Isles; that, in accordance with formal notice given by the Imperial German Government, vessels flying the flag of Great Britain, or any of her allies, are liable to destruction in those waters and that travellers sailing in the war zone on the ships of Great Britain or her allies do so at their own risk.
Imperial German Embassy
Washington, D.C. 22 April 1915

The notice was intended to appear on the Saturdays of 24 April, 1 May, and 8 May, but due to technical difficulties did not appear until 30 April, the day before Lusitania sailed, appearing in some cases adjacent to an advertisement for the return voyage. The juxtaposition was a coincidence, but the warning led to some agitation in the press, annoyance from the American government, and worried the ship's passengers and crew.

== Final voyage ==
=== Departure ===
Recording of Lusitania's departure from New York on her last voyage

While many British passenger ships had been called into duty for the war effort, Lusitania remained on her regular route between Liverpool and New York City. Captain Turner, known as "Bowler Bill" for his favourite shoreside headgear, tried to calm the passengers by explaining that the ship's speed made her safe from attack by submarine. Even at her reduced speed, the ship far exceeded the speed of a U-boat (16 knots, 30 km/h, 18 mph on the surface, 9 knots, 17 km/h, 10 mph submerged), requiring the ship to pass extremely near a waiting submarine to be attacked.

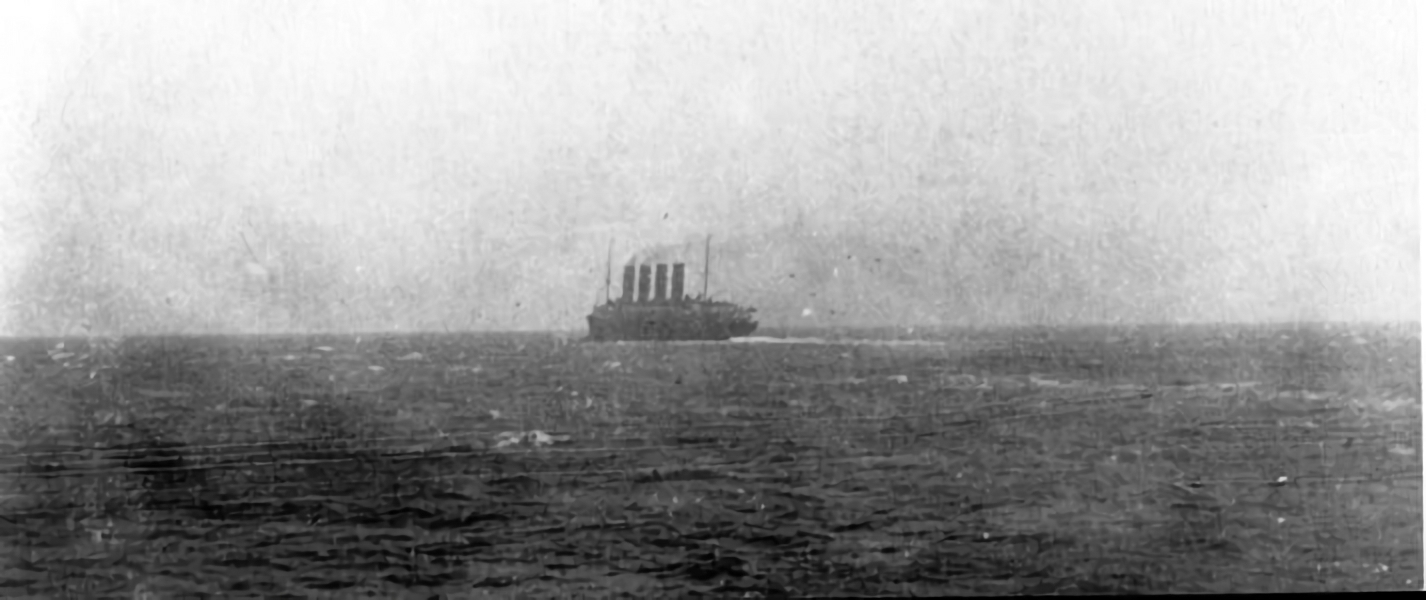
Lusitania departing New York, 1 May, in the last known photograph of her before her sinking

Departure out of New York on the return voyage to Liverpool was at noon on 1 May, two hours behind schedule, because of a last-minute transfer of forty-one passengers and crew from the recently requisitioned Cameronia. Shortly after departure three German-speaking men were found on board hiding in a steward's pantry. Detective Inspector William Pierpoint of the Liverpool police, who was travelling in the guise of a first-class passenger, interrogated them before locking them in the cells for further questioning when the ship reached Liverpool. Also among the crew was an Englishman, Neal Leach, who had been working as a tutor in Germany before the war. Leach had been interned but later released by Germany. The German embassy in Washington was notified about Leach's arrival in the United States, where he met known German agents. Leach and the three German stowaways went down with the ship. They were found with photographic equipment and thus probably had been tasked with spying on the ship. Most probably, Pierpoint, who survived the sinking, would already have been informed about Leach.

Thus, when Lusitania left Pier 54, she had 1,960 people aboard. In addition to her crew of 693 and 3 stowaways, she carried 1,264 passengers, mostly British nationals as well as a large number of Canadians, along with 159 Americans. 124 of the passengers were children. Her First Class accommodations, for which she was well regarded on the North Atlantic run, were booked at just over half capacity at 290. Second Class was severely overbooked with 601 passengers, far exceeding the maximum capacity of 460. While a large number of small children and infants helped reduce the squeeze into the limited number of two- and four-berth cabins, the situation was rectified by allowing some Second Class passengers to occupy empty First Class cabins. In Third Class, the situation was considered to be the norm for an eastbound crossing, with only 370 travelling in accommodations designed for 1,186.

=== Submarine activity ===
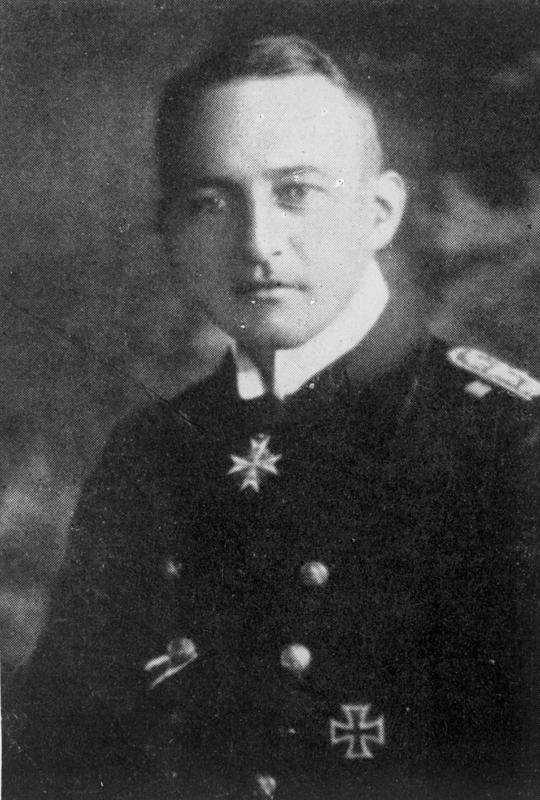
Walther Schwieger, commander of U-20

As the liner steamed across the ocean, the British Admiralty had been tracking the movements of U-20, commanded by Kapitänleutnant Walther Schwieger, through wireless intercepts and radio direction finding. The submarine left Borkum on 30 April, heading north-west across the North Sea. On 2 May, she had reached Peterhead and proceeded around the north of Scotland and Ireland, and then along the western and southern coasts of Ireland, to enter the Irish Sea from the south. Although the submarine's departure, destination, and expected arrival time were known to Room 40 in the Admiralty, the activities of the decoding department were considered so secret that they were unknown even to the normal intelligence division which tracked enemy ships or to the trade division responsible for warning merchant vessels. Only the very highest officers in the Admiralty saw the information and passed on warnings only when they felt it essential.

On 27 March, Room 40 had intercepted a message which clearly demonstrated that the Germans had broken the code used to pass messages to British merchant ships. Cruisers protecting merchant ships were warned not to use the code to give directions to shipping because it could just as easily attract enemy submarines as steering ships away from them. However, Queenstown was not given this warning and continued to give directions in the compromised code, which was not changed until after Lusitania's sinking. At this time, the Royal Navy was significantly involved with operations leading up to the landings at Gallipoli, and the intelligence department had been undertaking a programme of misinformation to convince Germany to expect an attack on her northern coast. As part of this, ordinary cross-channel traffic to the Netherlands was halted from 19 April and false reports were leaked about troopship movements from ports on Britain's western and southern coasts. This led to a demand from the German Army for offensive action against the expected troop movements and consequently, a surge in German submarine activity on the British west coast. The fleet was warned to expect additional submarines, but this warning was not passed on to those sections of the navy dealing with merchant vessels. The return of the battleship Orion from HMNB Devonport to Scotland was delayed until 4 May and she was given orders to stay 100 nautical miles (190 km; 120 mi) from the Irish coast.

On 5 May, U-20 stopped a merchant schooner, Earl of Lathom, off the Old Head of Kinsale, examined her papers, then ordered her crew to leave before sinking the schooner with gunfire. On 6 May, U-20 fired a torpedo at Cayo Romano, a British steamer originating from Cuba flying a neutral flag, off Fastnet Rock, narrowly missing by a few feet. At 22:30 on 5 May, the Royal Navy sent an uncoded warning to all ships – "Submarines active off the south coast of Ireland" – and at midnight an addition was made to the regular nightly warnings, "submarine off Fastnet". On 6 May U-20 sank the 6,000-ton steamer Candidate. It then failed to get off a shot at the 16,000-ton liner Arabic, because although she kept a straight course the liner was too fast, but then sank another 6,000-ton British cargo ship flying no flag, Centurion, all in the region of the Coningbeg light ship, around 61 nautical miles (113 km; 70 mi) east of the eventual attack. According to Room 40 archives, the sinking of Centurion in the early afternoon of the 6th would be the last reported position of the submarine until the attack on Lusitania.

The specific mention of a submarine was dropped from the midnight broadcast on 6–7 May as news of the new sinkings had not yet reached the navy at Queenstown, and it was correctly assumed that there was no longer a submarine at Fastnet. On the morning of 6 May, Lusitania was still 750 nautical miles (1,390 km; 860 mi) west of southern Ireland. However, Captain Turner was given two warning messages that evening. One at 7:52 pm repeated the information that submarines were active off the south coast of Ireland (in the mistaken belief that multiple submarines were in the area). The other, sent out at noon but only received at 8:05 pm gave instructions: "... Avoid headlands; pass harbours at full speed; steer mid-channel course. Submarines off Fastnet." Lusitania was now 370 miles west of Fastnet. Turner would subsequently be accused of disregarding these instructions. That evening a Seamen's Charities fund concert took place throughout the ship and the captain was obliged to attend the event in the first-class lounge.

Map showing the movements of RMS Lusitania and U-20 prior to the sinking of the former. Marked are ships sunk by U-20 on 6 and 7 May and key geographic points.

By 05:00 on 7 May, Lusitania reached a point 120 nautical miles (220 km; 140 mi) west-southwest of Fastnet Rock (off the southern tip of Ireland), where she met the patrolling boarding vessel Partridge. By 06:00, heavy fog had arrived and extra lookouts were posted. Upon entering the war zone, Captain Turner had 22 lifeboats swung out as a precaution so they could be launched more quickly if needed. As the ship came closer to Ireland, Captain Turner ordered depth soundings to be made and at 08:00 for speed to be reduced to 18 knots (33 km/h; 21 mph), then to 15 knots (28 km/h; 17 mph) and for the foghorn to be sounded. Some of the passengers were disturbed that the ship appeared to be advertising her presence. By 10:00, the fog began to lift, by noon it had been replaced by bright sunshine over a clear smooth sea and speed increased again to 18 knots.

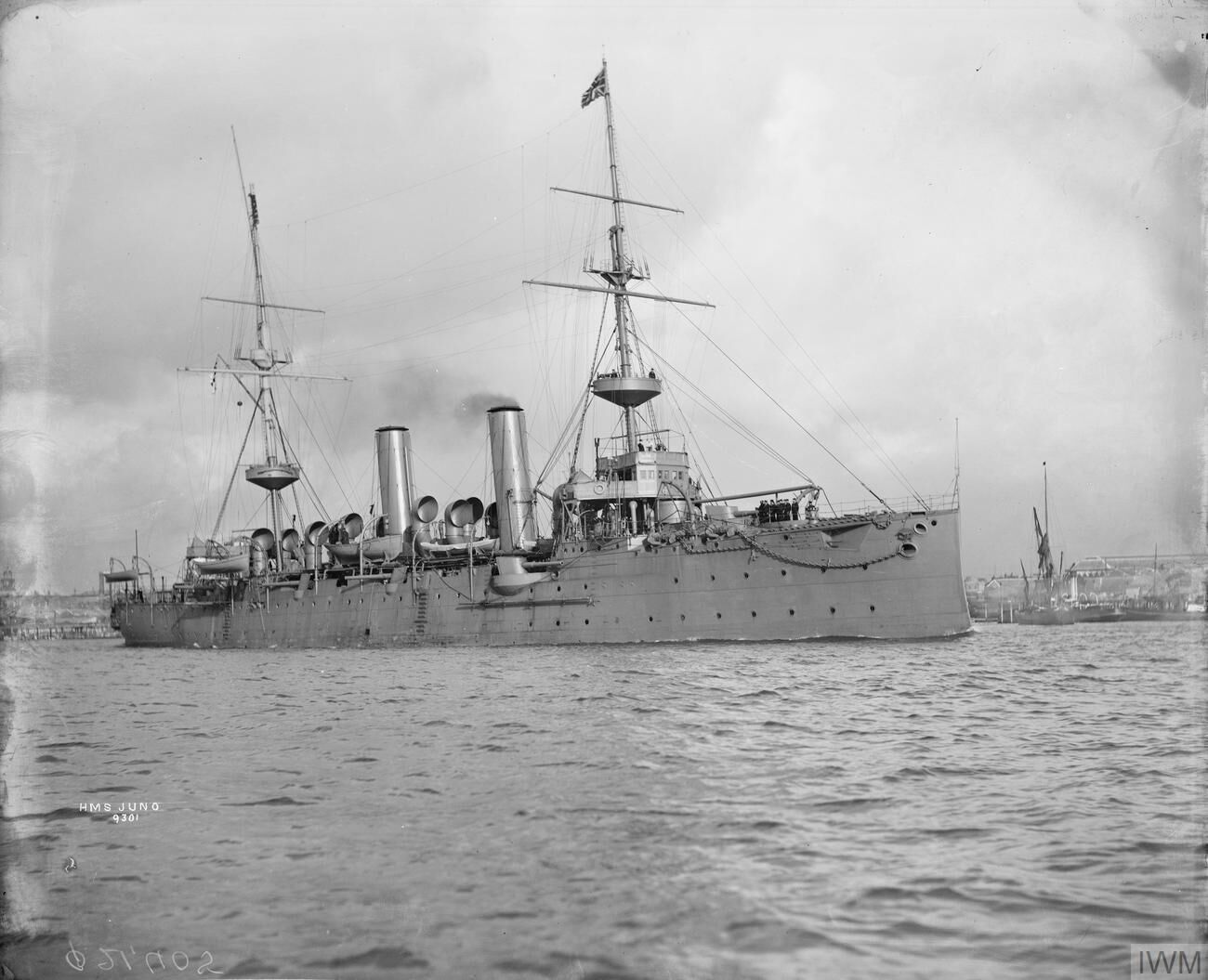
HMS Juno

RMS Lusitania, hit by torpedo off Kinsale Head, Ireland

At 11:02 Lusitania was given the message "Questor", which she replied "Westrona". This exchange has been interpreted by some theorists to be a coded message to divert to Queenstown. However, according to the Merchant Vessel codebook, this was a simply a query to confirm that Lusitania had the correct edition of the codebook. Turner subsequently stated he had no such intention for a diversion.

At about 11:52 on 7 May, the ship received another warning from the Admiralty, probably as a result of a request by Alfred Booth, who was concerned about Lusitania: "U-boats active in southern part of Irish Channel. Last heard of twenty miles south of Coningbeg Light Vessel." Booth and all of Liverpool had received news of the sinkings, which the Admiralty had known about by at least 3:00 that morning. Turner adjusted his heading northeast, not knowing that this report related to events of the previous day and apparently thinking submarines would be more likely to keep to the open sea, or that a sinking would be safer in shallower water. At 13:00 another message was received, "Submarine five miles south of Cape Clear proceeding west when sighted at 10:00 am". This report was inaccurate as no submarine had been at that location, but gave the impression that at least one submarine had been safely passed. Believing he was in a "safe zone", Turner focused on planning a course to Liverpool through what he understood to be dangerous waters further ahead. Shortly before the attack, John Crank, the baggage master, was specifically ordered to move luggage from the holds to the deck. Some have theorised this meant the ship was ordered to Queenstown, but there is no evidence to confirm this, and Crank's behaviour is consistent with other explanations, especially as Turner also ordered the ship's clocks be adjusted to GMT, not Irish time.

U-20 was low on fuel and had only three torpedoes left. That morning, visibility was poor and Schwieger decided to head for home. He submerged at 11:00 after sighting a fishing boat which he believed might be a British patrol and shortly after was passed while still submerged by a ship at high speed. This was the cruiser HMS Juno returning to Queenstown, zig-zagging at her fastest sustainable speed of 16 knots having received warning of submarine activity off Queenstown at 07:45. The Admiralty considered these old cruisers highly vulnerable to submarines, and indeed Schwieger attempted to target the ship.

=== Sinking ===
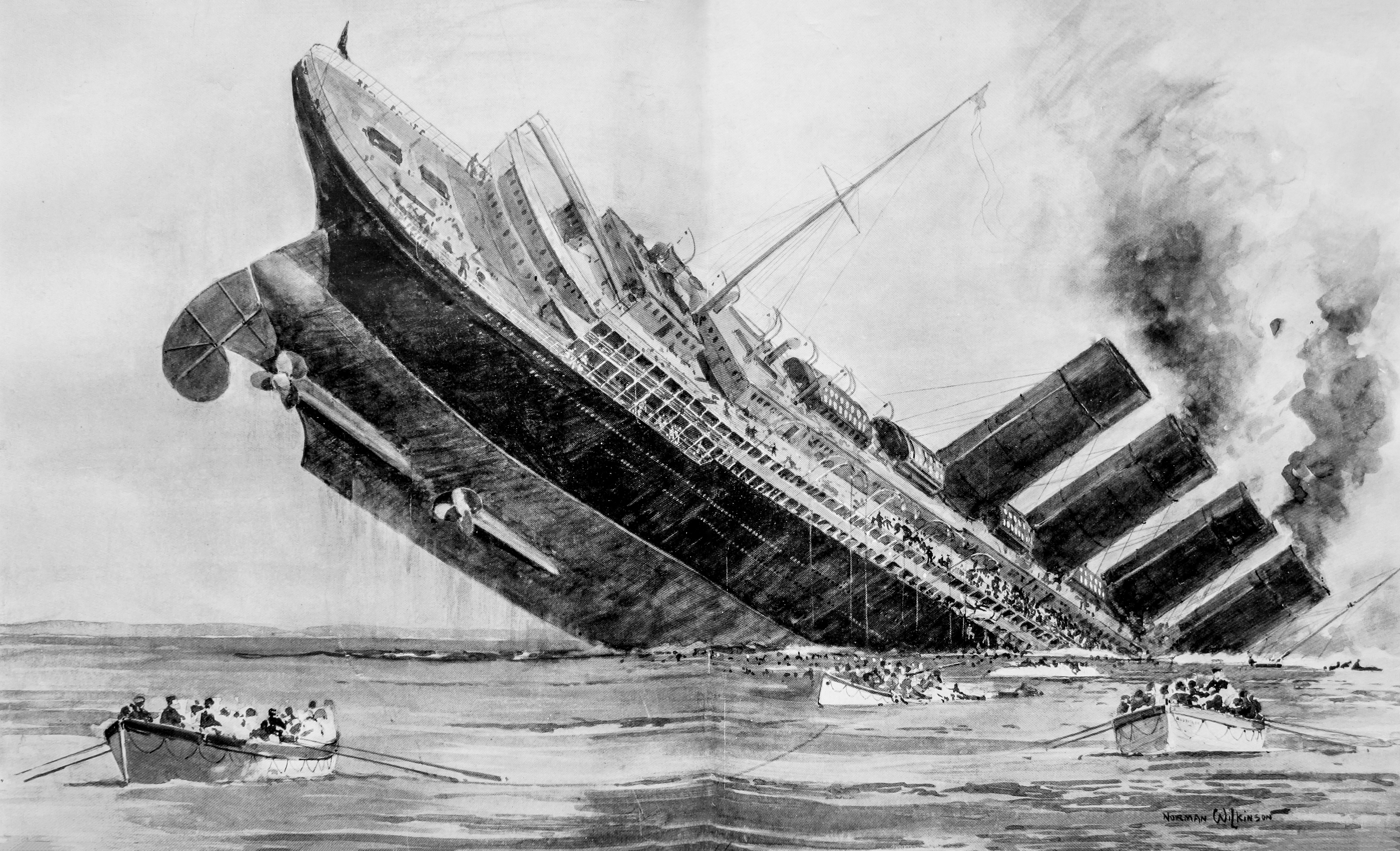
Illustration of the sinking by Norman Wilkinson

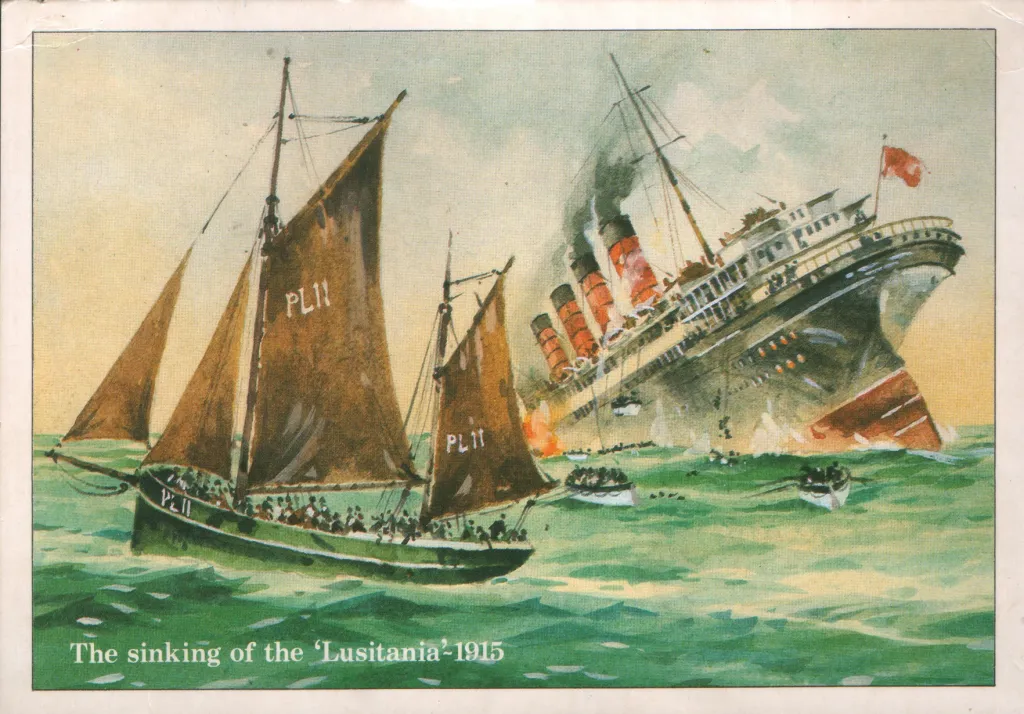
The fishing boat Wanderer near Lusitania as she sank

U-20 surfaced again at 12:45 as visibility was now excellent. At 13:20, something was sighted and Schwieger was summoned to the conning tower: at first it appeared to be several ships because of the number of funnels and masts, but this resolved into one large steamer appearing over the horizon. At 13:25, the submarine submerged to periscope depth of 6 fathoms (11 m; 36 ft) and set a course to intercept the liner at her maximum submerged speed of 9 knots. When the ships had closed to two nautical miles (3.7 km; 2.3 mi) Lusitania turned away, Schwieger feared he had lost his target, but she turned again, this time onto a near ideal course to bring her into position for an attack. At 14:10, with the target at a 700-metre (2,300 ft) range, he ordered one gyroscopic torpedo to be fired, set to run at a depth of two fathoms (4 m; 10 ft). According to Schwieger, he did not know the identity of the ship before he attacked, only that it was a large passenger ship. In his career, he launched several attacks without identifying his target, including a later attack on RMS Hesperian where he broke orders prohibiting attacking passenger vessels. Schwieger also misjudged the ship's speed to be 20 knots, but unfortunately for Lusitania, this offset another error he had made in the angle of attack. The torpedo was now on course to strike the ship in around a minute.

On board Lusitania, Leslie Morton, an eighteen-year-old lookout at the bow, who survived the sinking, had spotted thin lines of foam racing toward the ship. He shouted, "Torpedoes coming on the starboard side!" through a megaphone, thinking the bubbles came from two projectiles, not one. Upon impact, he describes: "I saw the torpedo coming, a white streak about two feet below the surface. It struck just below the bridge. There was a muffled explosion, and a cloud of coal dust and steam shot up. Then, almost instantly, there came a second explosion—far greater, more shattering. The ship trembled like a living thing." Schwieger's log entries attest that he launched only one torpedo. Some doubt the validity of this claim, contending that the German government subsequently altered the published fair copy of Schwieger's log, but accounts from other U-20 crew members corroborate it. The entries were also consistent with intercepted radio reports sent to Germany by U-20 once she had returned to the North Sea, before any possibility of an official cover-up.

Next, in Schwieger's own words, recorded in the log of U-20:

Torpedo hits starboard side right behind the bridge. An unusually heavy detonation takes place with a very strong explosive cloud. The explosion of the torpedo must have been followed by a second one [boiler or coal or powder?]... The ship stops immediately and heels over to starboard very quickly, immersing simultaneously at the bow... the name Lusitania becomes visible in golden letters.

Though Schwieger states the torpedo hit behind the bridge, and thus in the vicinity of the first funnel, survivor testimony, including that of Captain Turner, gave a number of different locations: some stated it was between the first and second funnels, others between the third and fourth. Most were in approximate agreement, as witnesses reported a plume of water which knocked Lifeboat No. 5 off its davits and a geyser of steel plating, coal smoke, cinders, and debris high above the deck, and crew working in the boilers claimed they were inundated immediately. This would accord with Schwieger's description. "It sounded like a million-ton hammer hitting a steam boiler a hundred feet high", one passenger said. In many accounts, a second explosion followed, ringing throughout the ship, and thick grey smoke began to pour out of the funnels and ventilator cowls that led deep into the boiler rooms. U-20's torpedo officer, Raimund Weisbach, viewed the destruction through the vessel's periscope and would recall only that the explosion of the torpedo was unusually severe.

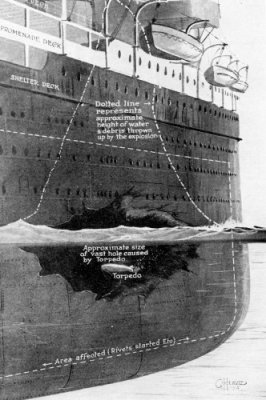
The effect of U-20's torpedo, including water plume from explosion

At 14:12, Captain Turner had Quartermaster Johnston stationed at the ship's wheel to steer "hard-a-starboard" towards the Irish coast, which Johnston confirmed, but the ship could not be steadied and rapidly ceased to respond to the wheel. Turner signalled for the engines to be reversed to halt the ship, but although the signal was received in the engine room, nothing could be done. Steam pressure had collapsed from 195 psi before the explosion, to 50 psi and falling afterwards, meaning Lusitania could not be steered or stopped to counteract the list or to beach herself. Lusitania's wireless operator sent out an immediate SOS, which was acknowledged by a coastal wireless station. Shortly afterward he transmitted the ship's position, ten nautical miles (19 km; 12 mi) south of the Old Head of Kinsale. At 14:14, the ship's electrical power failed, plunging the cavernous interior of the ship into darkness. Radio signals continued on emergency batteries, but electric lifts failed, trapping crew members in the forward cargo hold who had been preparing luggage to go ashore at Liverpool later that evening; it was these seamen precisely who were to report to muster stations to launch lifeboats in the event of a sinking; bulkhead doors, that were closed as a precaution before the attack, could not be reopened to release trapped men. Few testimonies report passengers trapped in the two central elevators, though one saloon passenger claimed to have seen the lifts stuck between the boat deck and the deck below while passing through the First Class entrance.

About one minute after the electrical power failed, Captain Turner gave the order to abandon ship. Water had flooded the ship's starboard longitudinal compartments, causing a 15-degree list to starboard. Within six minutes of the attack, Lusitania's forecastle had begun to submerge.

Lusitania's severe starboard list complicated the launch of her lifeboats. Ten minutes after the torpedo struck, when she had slowed enough to start putting boats in the water, the lifeboats on the starboard side swung out too far to step aboard safely. While it was still possible to board the lifeboats on the port side, lowering them presented a different problem. As was typical for the period, the hull plates of Lusitania were riveted, and as the lifeboats were lowered they dragged on the inch-high rivets, which threatened to seriously damage or capsize the boats before they landed in the water.

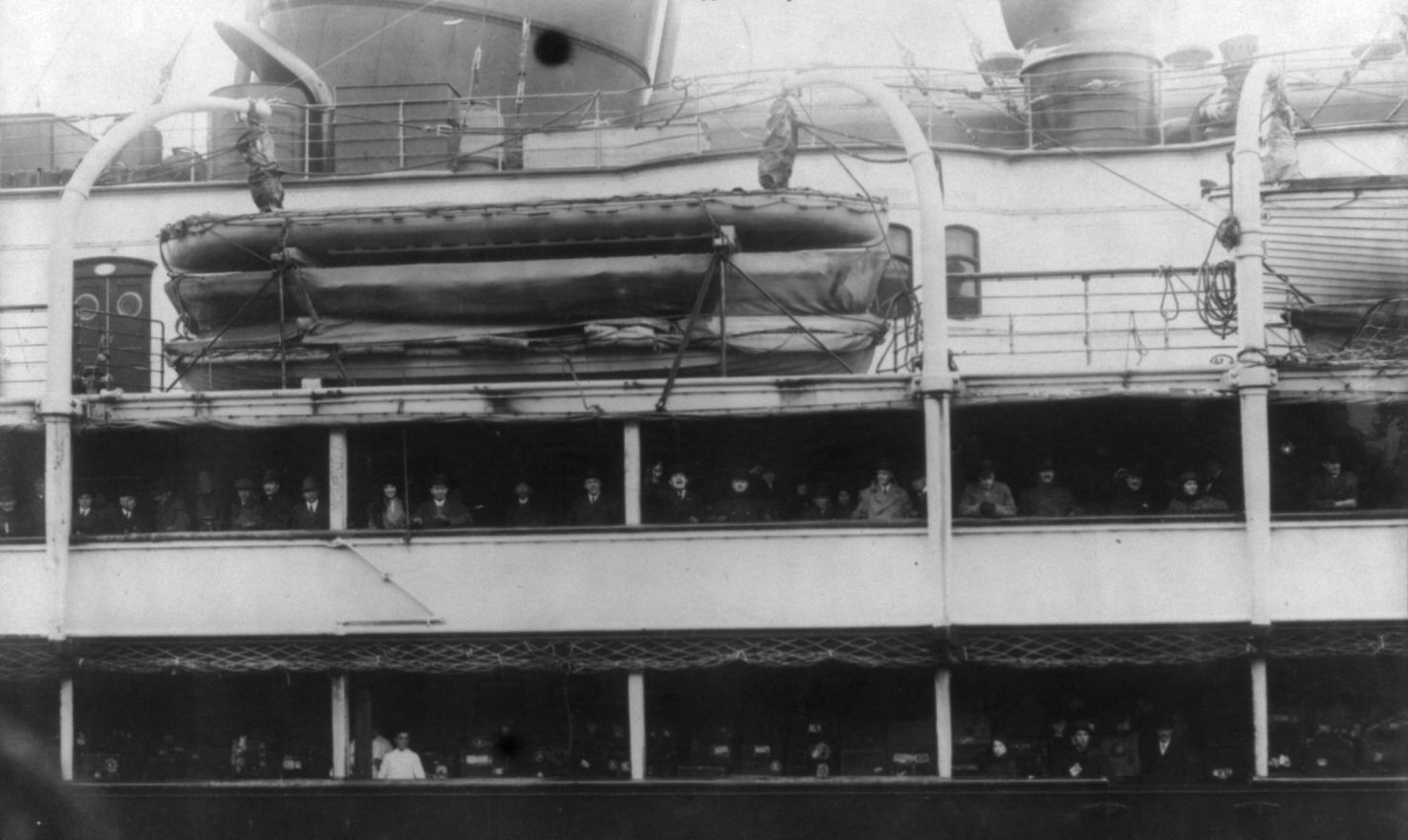
1914 picture showing additional collapsible lifeboats added to the ship

Many lifeboats overturned while loading or lowering, spilling passengers into the sea; others were overturned by the ship's motion when they hit the water. It has been claimed that some boats, because of the negligence of some officers, crashed down onto the deck, crushing passengers and sliding down towards the bridge. This has been disputed by passenger and crew testimony. Some untrained crewmen lost their grip on handheld ropes used to lower the lifeboats into the ocean, spilling the occupants into the sea. Other lifeboats tipped on launch as panicked passengers jumped into them. Lusitania had 48 lifeboats, more than enough for the crew and passengers, but only six were successfully lowered, all from the starboard side. Lifeboat 1 overturned as it was being lowered, spilling its original occupants into the sea, but righted itself shortly afterwards and was later filled with people from in the water. Lifeboats 9 (5 people on board) and 11 (7 people on board) managed to reach the water safely with a few people, but both later picked up many swimmers. Lifeboats 13 and 15 also safely reached the water, overloaded with around 150 people. Finally, Lifeboat 21 (52 people on board) reached the water safely and cleared the ship moments before her final plunge. A few collapsible lifeboats washed off her decks as she sank, providing flotation for some survivors.

Two lifeboats on the port side cleared the ship as well. Lifeboat 14 (11 people on board) was lowered and launched safely, but because the boat plug was not in place, filled with seawater and sank almost immediately. Later, Lifeboat 2 floated away from the ship with new occupants (its previous ones having been spilled into the sea when they upset the boat) after they removed a rope and one of the ship's "tentacle-like" funnel stays. They rowed away shortly before the ship sank.

According to Schwieger, he observed panic and disorder on the starboard side of the deck through U-20's periscope, and by 14:25 dropped the periscope and headed out to sea. Later that day, he fired a torpedo at American tanker Narragansett, but missed. Subsequently, the submarine traveled north up the west coast of Ireland, and proceeded to Wilhelmshaven.

Surviving passengers on the port side of the deck, however, paint a calmer picture. Many, including author Charles Lauriat, who published his account of the disaster, stated that a few passengers climbed into the early portside lifeboats before being ordered out by Staff Captain James Anderson, who proclaimed, "This ship will not sink" and reassured those nearby that the liner had "touched bottom" and would stay afloat. In reality, he had ordered the crew to wait and fill Lusitania's portside ballast tanks with seawater to even the ship's trim so the lifeboats could be lowered safely. As a result, few boats on the port side were launched, none under Anderson's supervision.

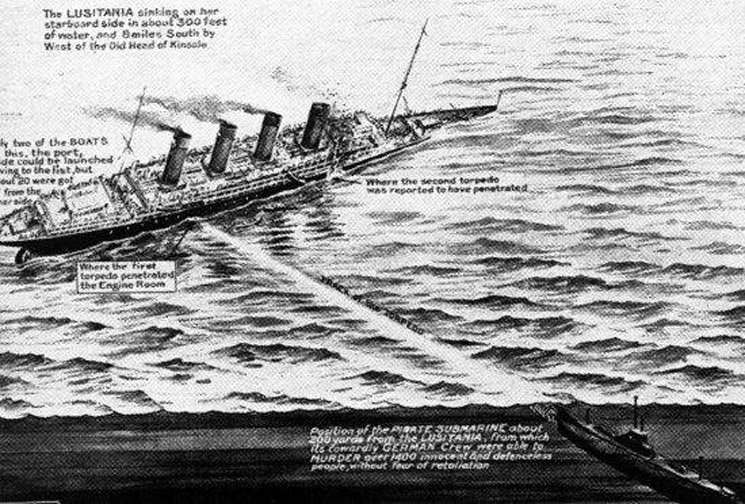
The second explosion made passengers believe U-20 had torpedoed Lusitania a second time

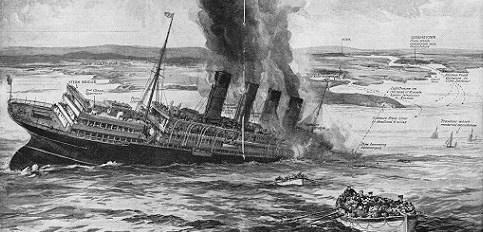
Lusitania is shown sinking as Irish fishermen race to the rescue. In fact, the launching of the lifeboats was more chaotic

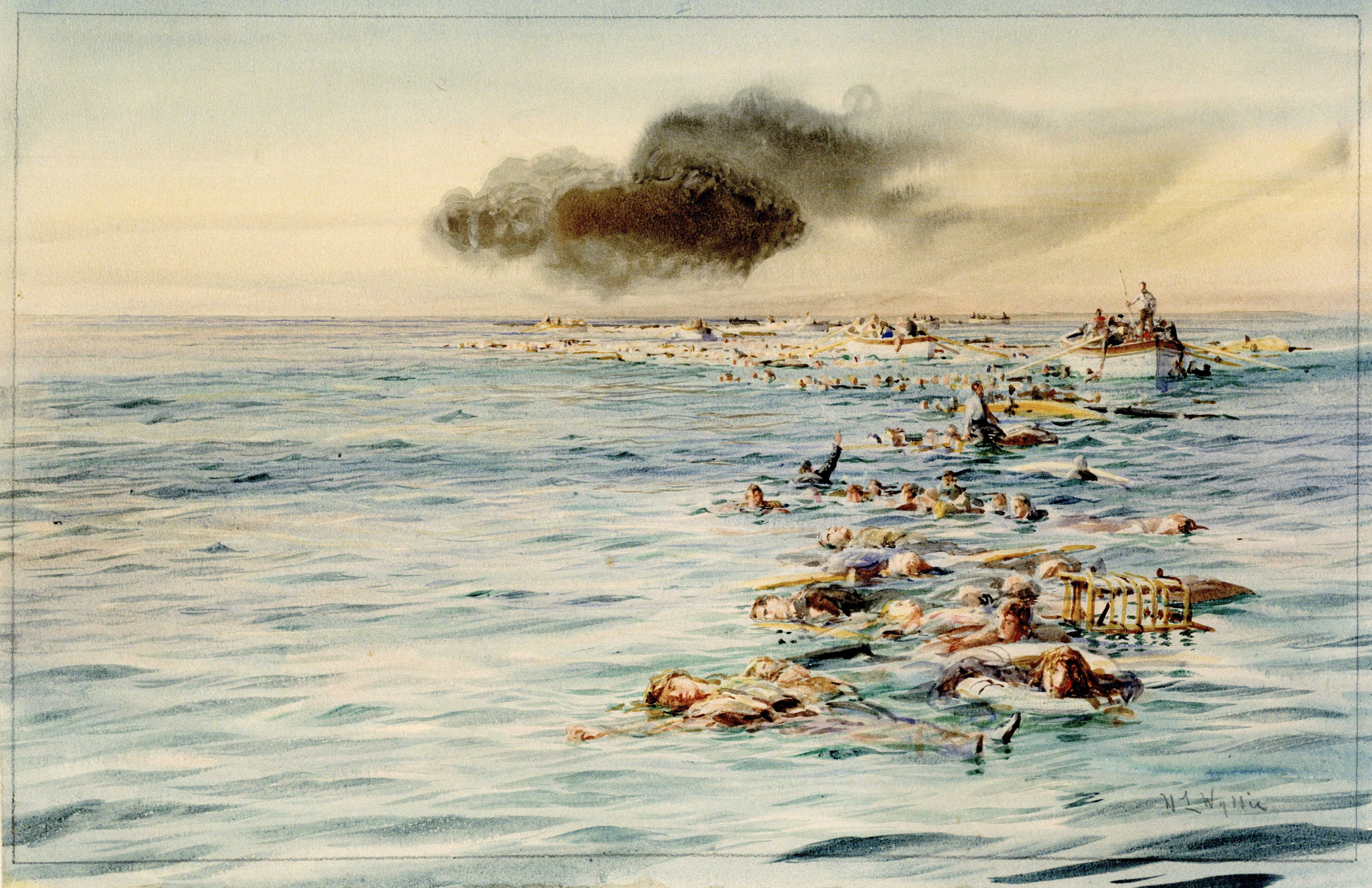
The track of Lusitania. View of casualties and survivors in the water and in lifeboats. Painting by William Lionel Wyllie

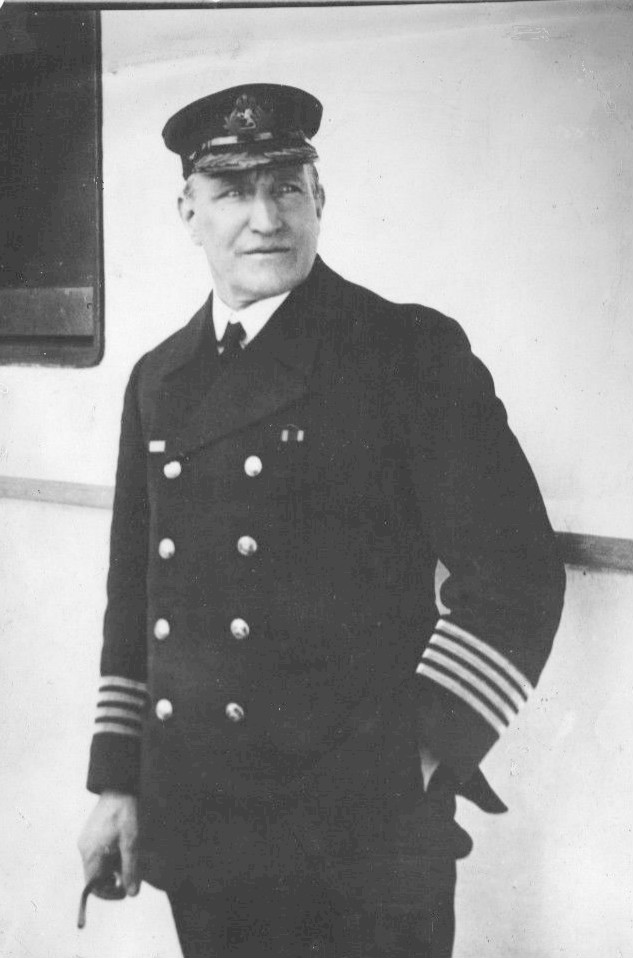
Captain Turner, photographed on 11 May 1915, four days after the sinking

Captain Turner was on the deck near the bridge clutching the ship's logbook and charts when a wave swept upward towards the bridge and the rest of the ship's forward superstructure, knocking him overboard into the sea. He managed to swim and find a chair floating in the water which he clung to. He survived, having been pulled unconscious from the water after spending three hours there. Lusitania's bow slammed into the bottom about 55 fathoms (330 ft; 101 m) below at a shallow angle because of her forward momentum as she sank. Along the way, some boilers exploded and the ship returned briefly to an even keel. Turner's last navigational fix had been only two minutes before the torpedoing, and he was able to remember the ship's speed and bearing at the moment of the sinking. This was accurate enough to locate the wreck after the war. The ship travelled about two nautical miles (4 km; 2 mi) from the time of the torpedoing to her final resting place, leaving a trail of debris and people behind. After her bow sank completely, Lusitania's stern rose out of the water, enough for her propellers to be seen, and went under. As the tips of Lusitania's four, 70-foot (21 m)-tall funnels dipped beneath the surface, they formed whirlpools which dragged nearby swimmers down with the ship. Her masts and rigging were the last to disappear.

Lusitania sank in only 18 minutes, at a distance of 11.5 nautical miles (21 km; 13 mi) off the Old Head of Kinsale. Despite being relatively close to shore, it took several hours for help to arrive from the Irish coast. By the time help arrived, however, many in the 52 °F (11 °C) water had succumbed to the cold. By the days' end, 767 passengers and crew from Lusitania had been rescued and landed at Queenstown, though 4 died shortly after. The final death toll for the disaster came to a catastrophic number. Of the 1,960 aboard Lusitania at the time of her sinking, 1,197 (61%) had been lost, including 94 children and about 128 Americans (though the official toll at the time gave slightly different numbers). In the days following the disaster, the Cunard line offered local fishermen and sea merchants a cash reward for the bodies floating all throughout the Irish Sea, some floating as far away as the Welsh coast. Only 289 bodies were recovered, 65 of which were never identified. The bodies of many of the victims were buried at either Queenstown, where 148 bodies were interred in the Old Church Cemetery, or the Church of St Multose in Kinsale, but the bodies of the remaining 885 victims were never recovered.

One story—an urban legend—states that when Lieutenant Schwieger of U-20 gave the order to fire, his quartermaster, Charles Voegele, would not take part in an attack on women and children, and refused to pass on the order to the torpedo room – a decision for which he was court-martialed and imprisoned at Kiel until the end of the war. This rumour persisted from 1972, when the French daily paper Le Monde published a letter to the editor. However, Voegele was the U-20's electrician at the time of the torpedoing, not the quartermaster. Despite seemingly putting an end to this rumour, Voegele's alleged hesitation was depicted in the torpedoing scene of the 2007 docudrama Sinking of the Lusitania: Terror at Sea.

=== Notable passengers ===
==== Survived ====
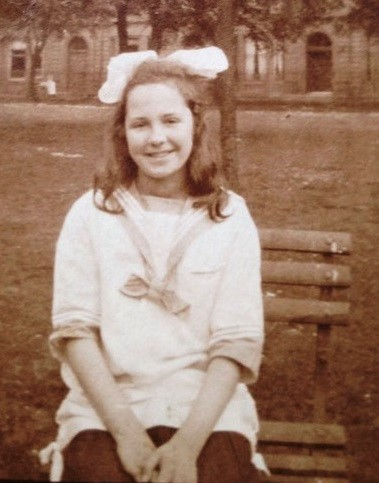
Avis Dolphin

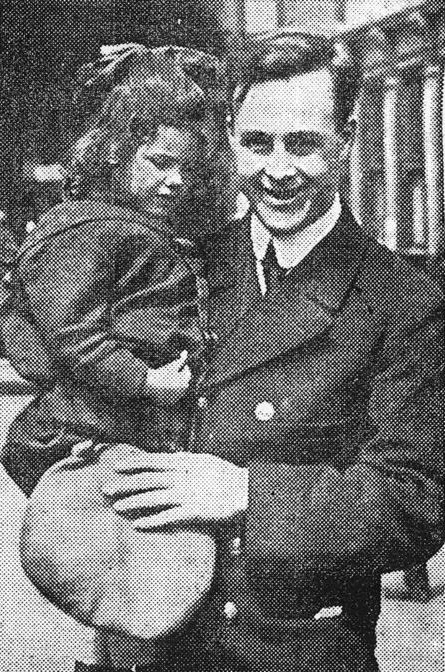
Barbara McDermott, second-to-last survivor, with Assistant Purser William Harkness

- Oliver Percy Bernard, 34. Scenic designer whose sketches of the sinking were published in The Illustrated London News.
- Josephine Brandell, 27. Musical actress and singer.
- Avis Dolphin, 12. A friend of Ian Holbourn, who inspired his bestselling children's book, The Child of the Moat, A Story for Girls, 1557 A.D. (1916).
- Ogden H. Hammond, 45. Politician and future United States Ambassador to Spain.
- Ian Holbourn, 42. Oxford professor and writer.
- Charles T. Jeffery, 38. Automobile manufacturer. Head of the Thomas B. Jeffery Company following his father's death in 1910.
- Rita Jolivet, 30. French-American stage and screen actress.
- Kathleen Kaye, 16. Returning alone to England from New York. Assumed charge of a lifeboat following the sinking.
- Margaret Mackworth (Lady Humphrey Mackworth), 31. British suffragist and daughter of D. A. Thomas. Later 2nd Viscountess Rhondda
- Sir Frederick Orr-Lewis, 55. 1st Baronet and Canadian businessman.
- Theodate Pope Riddle, 48. American architect and philanthropist.
- D. A. Thomas, 59. British former MP (later Viscount Rhondda).
- Scott Turner, 34. Mining engineer.
- Audrey Pearl, 3 months. Later British socialite and philanthropist. Last living survivor.
- Gwynn Parry Jones, 24. World-famous Welsh tenor, one of the 16 soloists of Vaughan Williams' Serenade to Music.
- Marguerite, Lady Allan, 42. Montreal socialite, philanthropist and patron of the arts, wife of Sir H. Montagu Allan, chairman of the Allan Line

==== Died ====
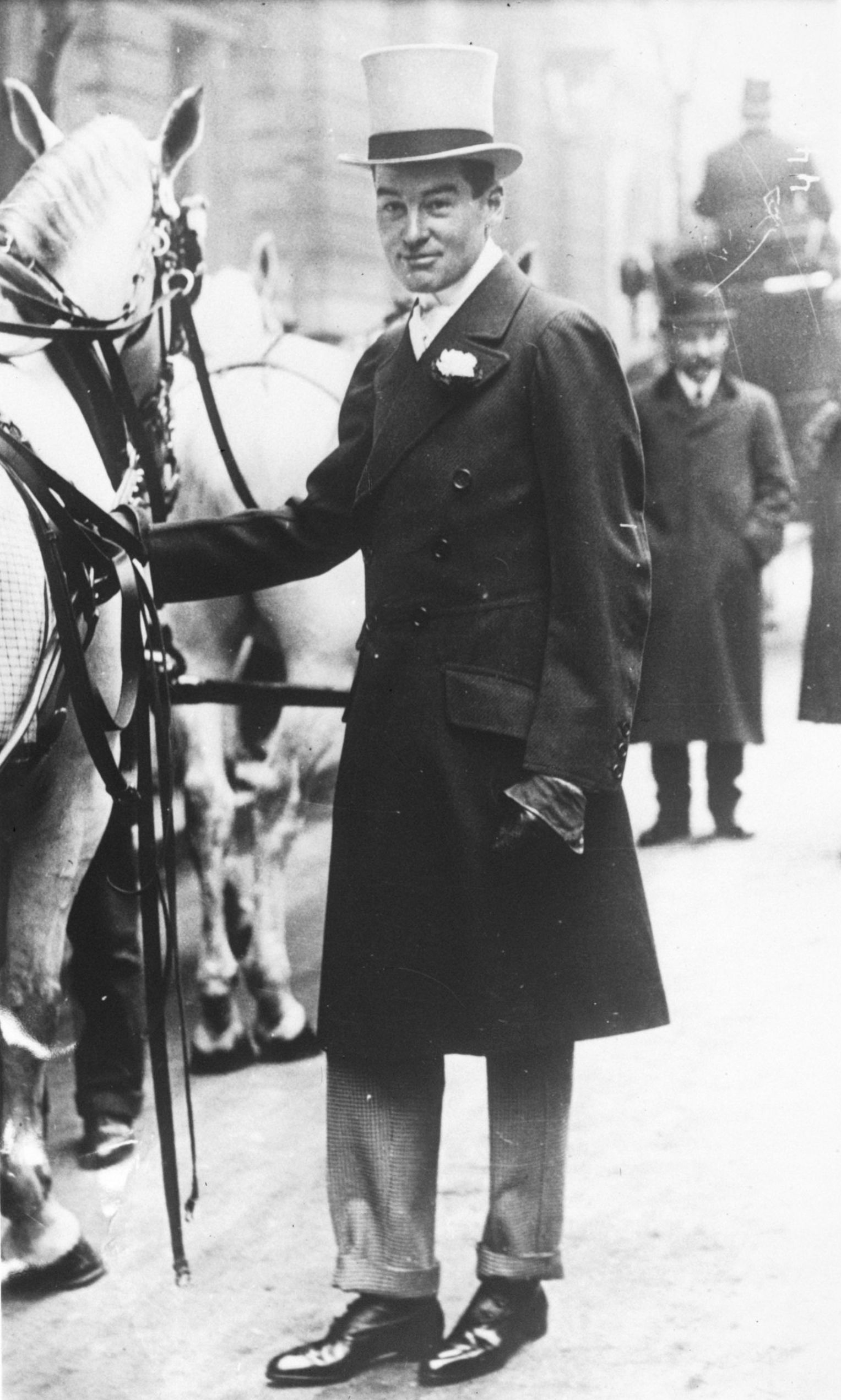
Alfred Gwynne Vanderbilt

- Lindon Bates Jr., 31. American engineer and politician.
- Thomas O'Brien Butler, 53. Irish composer and conductor.
- William Broderick Cloete, 62. Mining entrepreneur who was returning to London from Mexico. His body was never found.
- Marie Depage, 42. Belgian nurse and wife of surgeon Antoine Depage.
- Justus Miles Forman, 39. American novelist and playwright.
- Charles Frohman, 58. American theatre impresario and one of four American "men of world wide prominence" named in the film The Sinking of the Lusitania (1918).
- Mary Picton Stevens Hammond, 26. Granddaughter of Edwin Augustus Stevens, wife of Ogden H. Hammond, and mother of Millicent Fenwick.
- Albert L. Hopkins, 44. President of Newport News Shipbuilding.
- Elbert Hubbard, 58. American philosopher, writer and Roycroft founder, and one of four American "men of world wide prominence" named in the film The Sinking of the Lusitania (1918).
- Alice Moore Hubbard, 53. Author and woman's rights activist, wife of Elbert Hubbard.
- Charles Klein, 48. Playwright and one of four American "men of world wide prominence" named in film The Sinking of the Lusitania (1918)
- Sir Hugh Lane, 39. Renowned Irish art collector and founder of the Hugh Lane Municipal Gallery in Dublin.
- Rev. Dr. Basil W. Maturin, 68. British theologian, author, and convert to Catholicism
- Theodore Naish, 59, British-American engineer, namesake of the Theodore Naish Scout Reservation near Edwardsville, Kansas.
- Frederick Stark Pearson, 53. American engineer and entrepreneur. His wife, Mabel Ward Pearson, also perished in the sinking.
- Frances McIntosh Stephens, 64. Montreal socialite and wife of politician George Washington Stephens; with her perished her infant grandson.
- Alfred Gwynne Vanderbilt, 37. Sportsman, millionaire, member of the Vanderbilt family, and one of four American "men of world wide prominence" named in the 1918 film The Sinking of the Lusitania – last seen fastening a life vest onto a woman holding a baby.
- Lothrop Withington, 59. American genealogist, historian and book editor, and famous singer.

=== Crew members ===
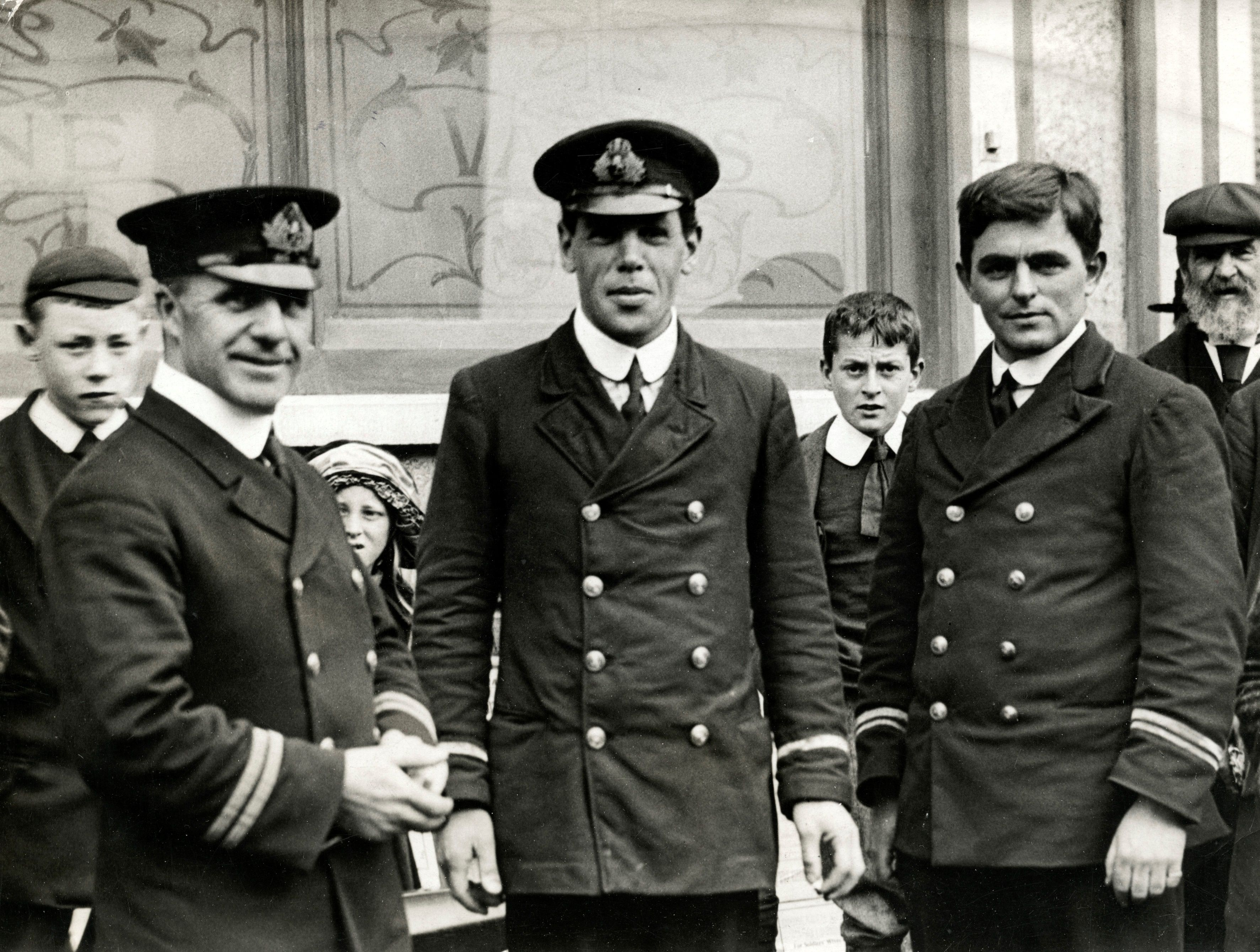
Three surviving officers of Lusitania. From left to right: Arthur R. Jones, Albert Bestic, and John Lewis

==== Survived ====
- William Thomas Turner, 59, captain of RMS Lusitania.
- Arthur Rowland Jones, 35, first officer
- John Idwal Lewis, 29, senior third officer
- Albert Arthur Bestic, 24, junior third officer

==== Died ====
- James Clarke Anderson, 48, staff captain
- John Teather Piper, 41, chief officer
- John Stevens, 62, extra chief officer
- Percy Hefford, 34, second officer

== Official inquiries ==
=== Cork county coroner ===
On 8 May, the local county coroner John Hogan opened an inquest in Kinsale into the deaths of two males and three females whose bodies had been brought ashore by a local boat, Heron. Most of the survivors (and dead) had been taken to Queenstown instead of Kinsale, which was closer. On 10 May Captain Turner gave evidence as to the events of the sinking where he described that the ship had been struck by one torpedo between the third and fourth funnels. This had been followed immediately by a second explosion. He acknowledged receiving general warnings about submarines, but had not been informed of the sinking of Earl of Lathom. He stated that he had received other instructions from the Admiralty which he had carried out but was not permitted to discuss. The coroner brought in a verdict that the deceased had drowned following an attack on an unarmed non-combatant vessel contrary to international law. Half an hour after the inquest had concluded and its results given to the press, the Crown Solicitor for Cork, Henry Wynne, arrived with instructions to halt it. Captain Turner was not to give evidence and no statements should be made about any instructions given to shipping about avoiding submarines.

=== Board of Trade investigation ===
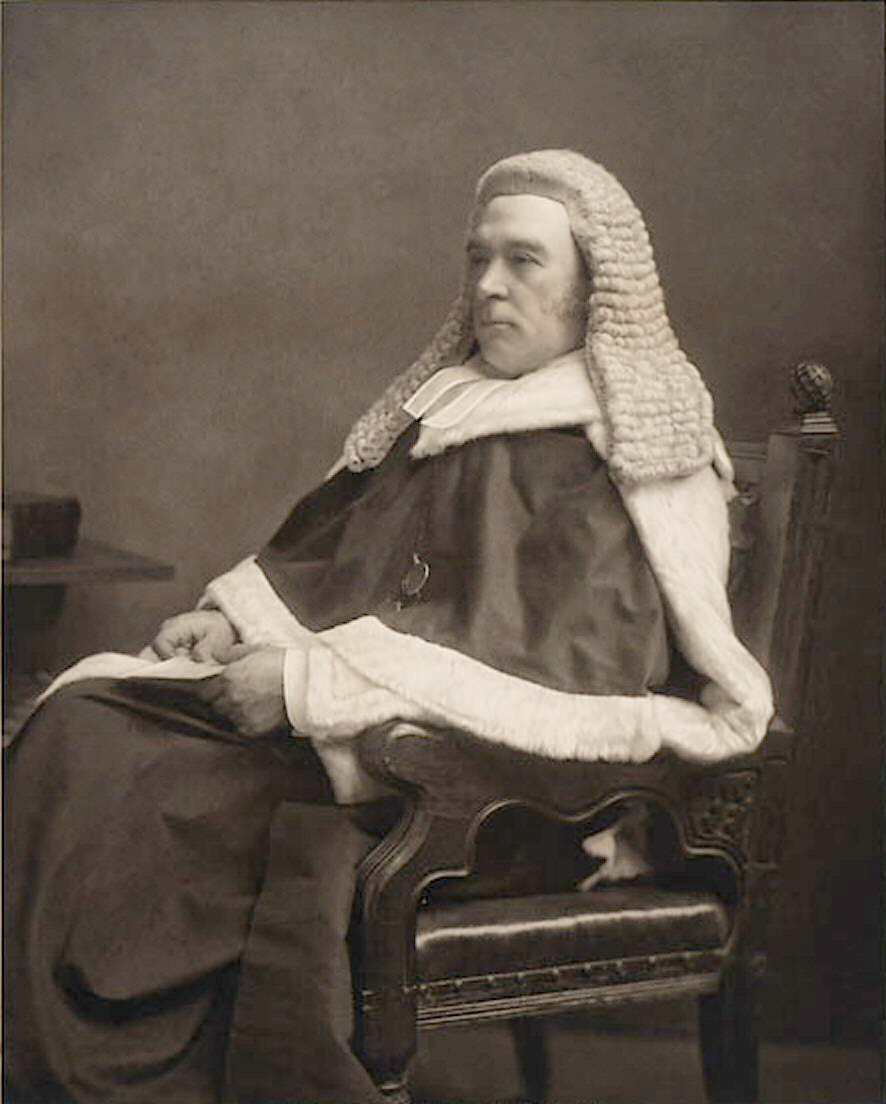
Lord Mersey, wreck commissioner presiding over the inquiry.

The formal Board of Trade investigation into the sinking was presided over by Wreck Commissioner Lord Mersey and took place in the Westminster Central Hall from 15 to 18 June 1915 with further sessions at the Westminster Palace Hotel on 1 July and Caxton Hall on 17 July. Lord Mersey had a background in commercial rather than maritime law but had presided over a number of important maritime investigations, including that into the loss of Titanic. He was assisted by four assessors, as well as Attorney General Sir Edward Carson, Solicitor General F. E. Smith, representing the Board of Trade, and Butler Aspinall, who represented Cunard. A total of 36 witnesses were called, Lord Mersey querying why more of the survivors would not be giving evidence. Most of the sessions were public, but two on 15 and 18 June were held in camera when evidence regarding navigation of the ship was presented.

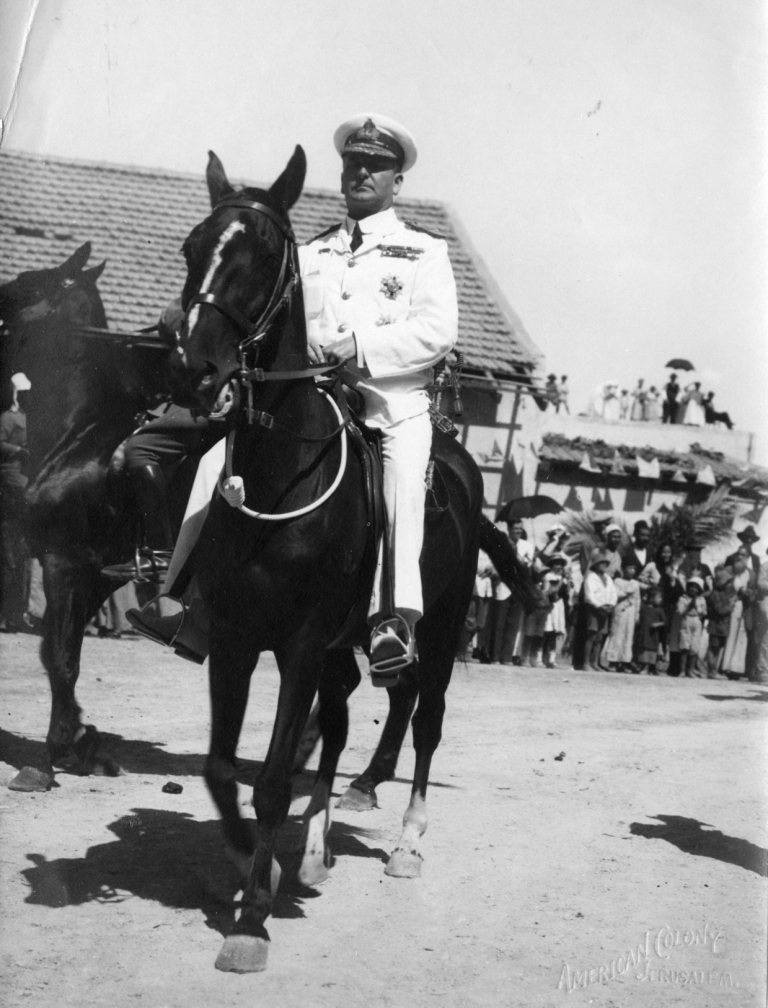
Richard Webb, director of the Trade Division at the time.

During the closed hearings, the Admiralty tried to lay the blame on Captain Turner, their intended line being that Turner had been negligent. First Sea Lord Fisher noted on one document submitted by Webb for review: "As the Cunard company would not have employed an incompetent man its a certainty that Captain Turner is not a fool but a knave. I hope that Turner will be arrested immediately after the enquiry whatever the verdict". First Lord Winston Churchill noted: "I consider the Admiralty's case against Turner should be pressed by a skilful counsel and that Captain Webb should attend as a witness, if not employed as an assessor. We will pursue the captain without check". In the event, both Churchill and Fisher were replaced in their positions before the enquiry because of the failures of the Gallipoli campaign.

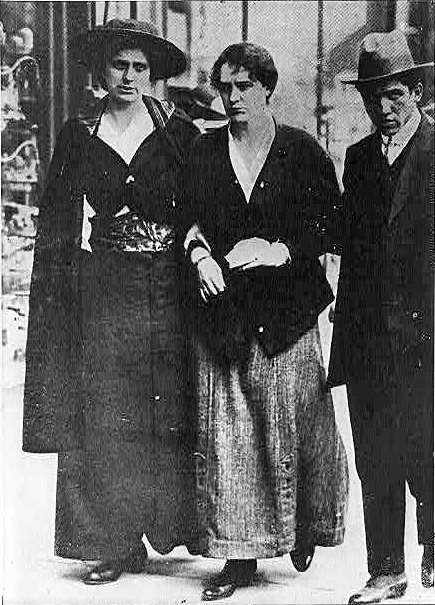
A survivor of the sinking. Pictured 25 May 1915

An additional hearing took place on 1 July, at the insistence of Joseph Marichal, who was threatening to sue Cunard for their poor handling of the disaster. He testified that the second explosion had sounded to him like the rattling of machine gun fire and appeared to be below the second class dining room at the rear of the ship where he had been seated. The rifle cartridges Marichal alluded to were mentioned during the case, with Lord Mersey stating that "the 5,000 cases of ammunition on board were 50 yards away from where the torpedo struck the ship, there were no other explosives on board." All had agreed they could not have caused the second explosion.

In the end, however, Captain Turner, the Cunard Line, and the Royal Navy were absolved of any negligence, and all blame was placed on the German government. Lord Mersey found that Turner did deviate from Admiralty instructions which may have saved the ship, but such instructions were suggestions more than orders. Thus, the captain had "exercised his judgment for the best" and that the blame for the disaster "must rest solely with those who plotted and with those who committed the crime".

=== American court proceedings ===
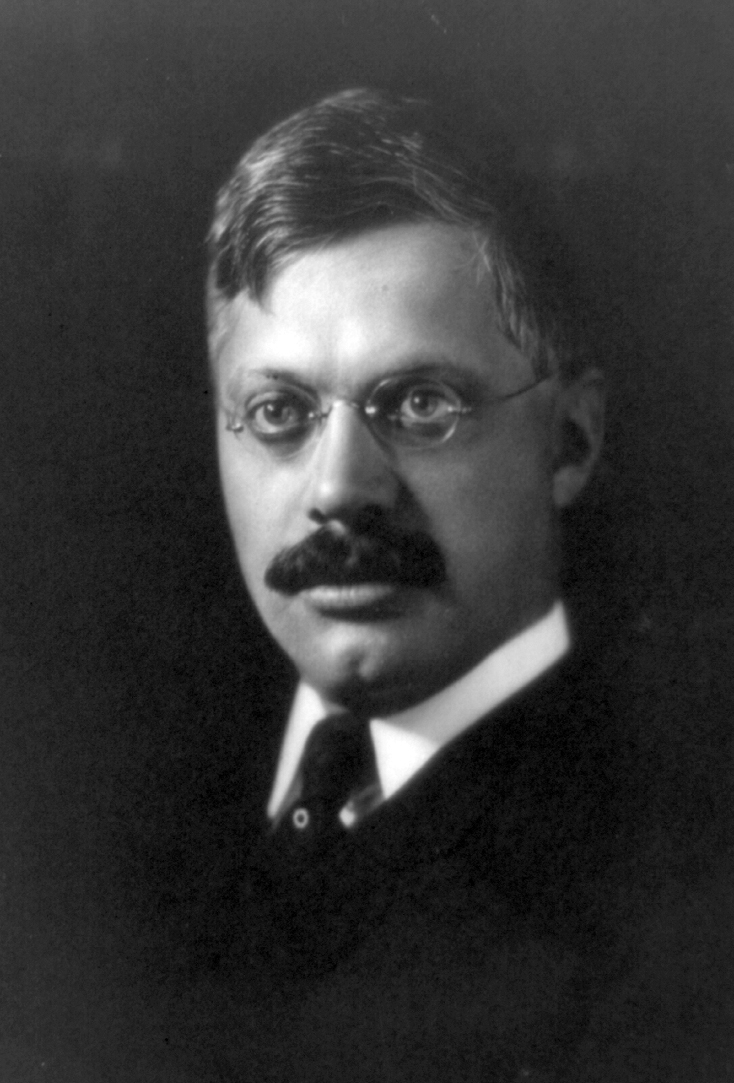
Judge Julius Mayer, presiding.

In the United States, 67 claims for compensation were lodged against Cunard, which were all heard together in 1918 before the United States District Court for the Southern District of New York. Judge Julius Mayer, presided over the case: he had previously presided over the case brought following the loss of Titanic, where he had ruled in favour of the shipping company. Mayer was a conservative who was considered a safe pair of hands with matters of national interest, and whose favourite remark to lawyers was to "come to the point". The case was to be heard without a jury. The two sides agreed beforehand that no question would be raised regarding whether Lusitania had been armed or carrying troops or ammunition. Thirty-three witnesses who could not travel to the US gave statements in England to Commissioner R. V. Wynne. Evidence produced in open court for the Mersey investigation was considered, but evidence from the British closed sessions was not. The Defence of the Realm Act was invoked so that British witnesses could not give evidence on any subject it covered. Statements had been collected in Queenstown after the sinking by the American consul, Wesley Frost, but these were not produced.

Captain Turner gave evidence in Britain and now gave a more spirited defence of his actions. He argued that up until the time of the sinking he had no reason to think that zig-zagging in a fast ship would help. Indeed, that he had since commanded another ship which was sunk while zig-zagging. His position was supported by evidence from other captains, who said that prior to the sinking of Lusitania no merchant ships zig-zagged. Turner had argued that maintaining a steady course for 30 minutes was necessary to take a four-point bearing and precisely confirm the ship's position, but on this point he received less support, with other captains arguing a two-point bearing could have been taken in five minutes and would have been sufficiently accurate.

Many witnesses testified that portholes across the ship had been open at the time of the sinking, and an expert witness confirmed that such a porthole three feet under water would let in four tons of water per minute. Testimony varied on how many torpedoes there had been, and whether the strike occurred between the first and second funnel, or third and fourth. The nature of the official cargo was considered, but experts considered that under no conditions could the cargo have exploded. A record exists that Crewman Jack Roper wrote to Cunard in 1919 requesting expenses for his testimony in accord with the line indicated by Cunard.

The decision was rendered on 23 August 1918. Mayer's judgement was that "the cause of the sinking was the illegal act of the Imperial German Government", that two torpedoes had been involved, that the captain had acted properly and emergency procedures had been up to the standard then expected. He ruled that further claims for compensation should be addressed to the German government (which eventually paid $2.5 million in 1925).

== International reaction ==
=== German ===
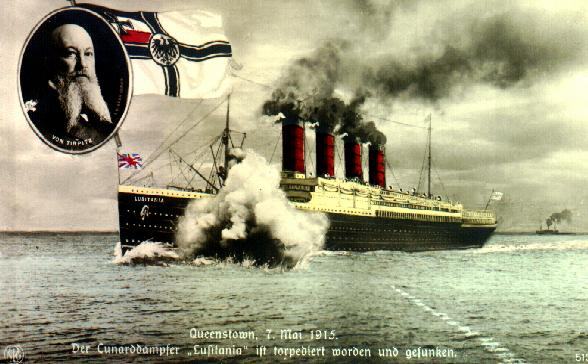
German propaganda postcard of Lusitania. The torpedo is incorrectly depicted as hitting the port side of ship. Next to the Kaiserliche Marine ensign is shown Grand Admiral Tirpitz, major proponent of submarine warfare.

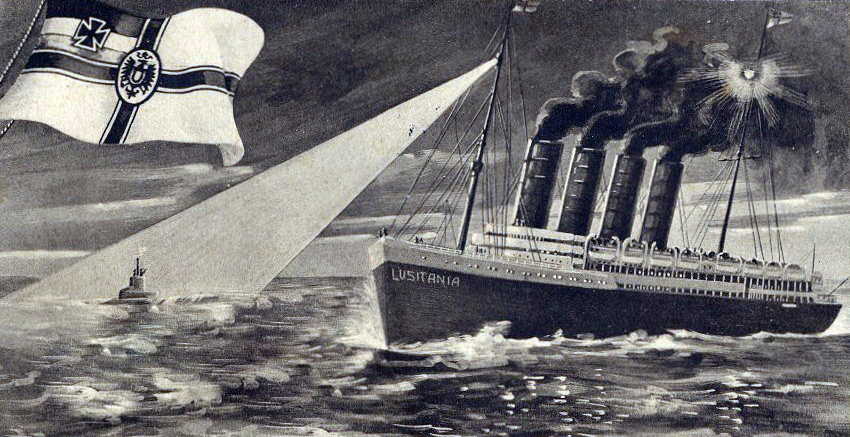
Another German propaganda postcard. U-20 is depicted incorrectly as being on the surface and thus is spotted by Lusitania.

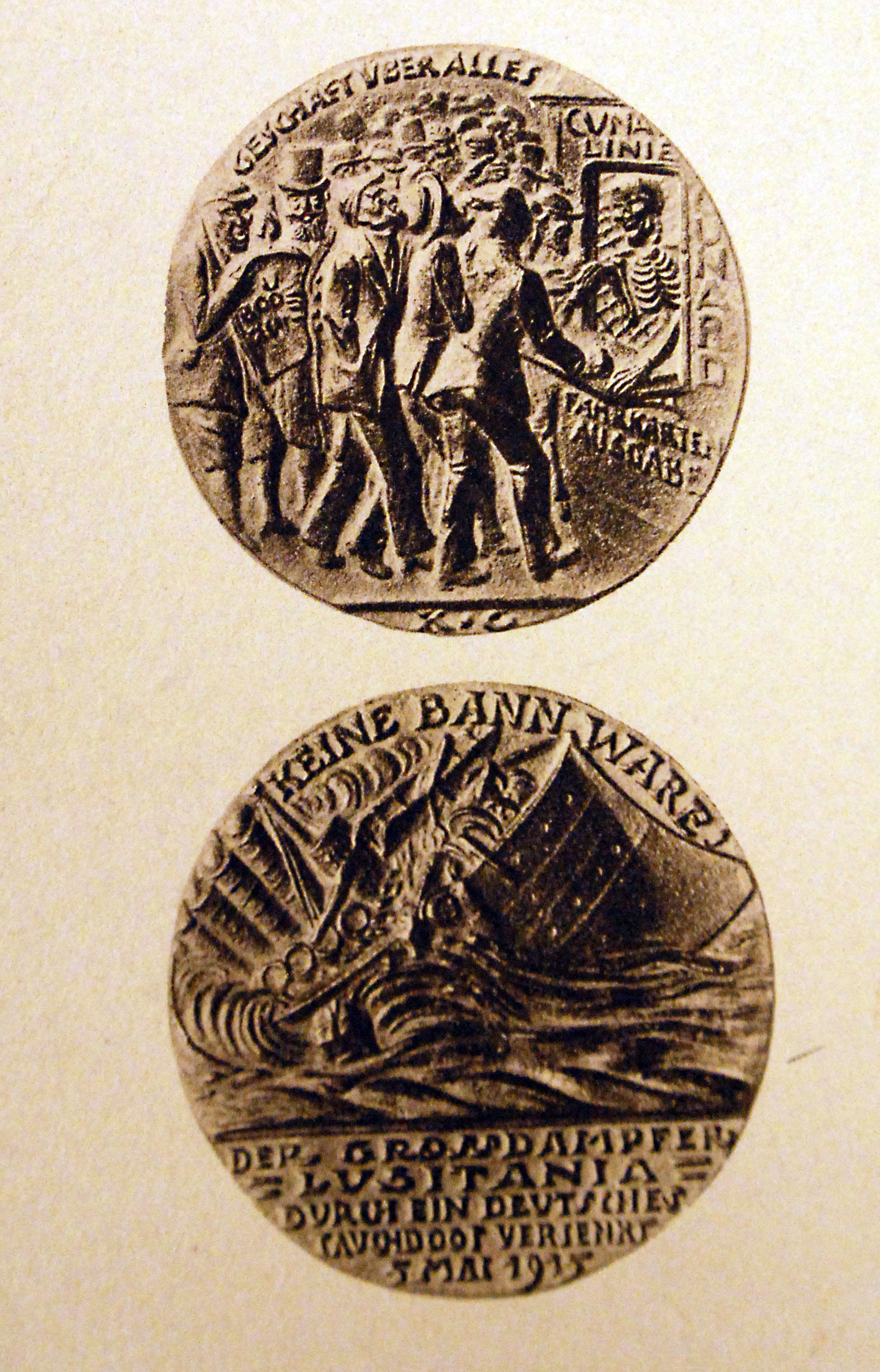
Original Goetz propaganda medal. Lusitania is shown with exaggerated armaments, including aircraft and cannon on board. The wrong date of "5 Mai" is given.
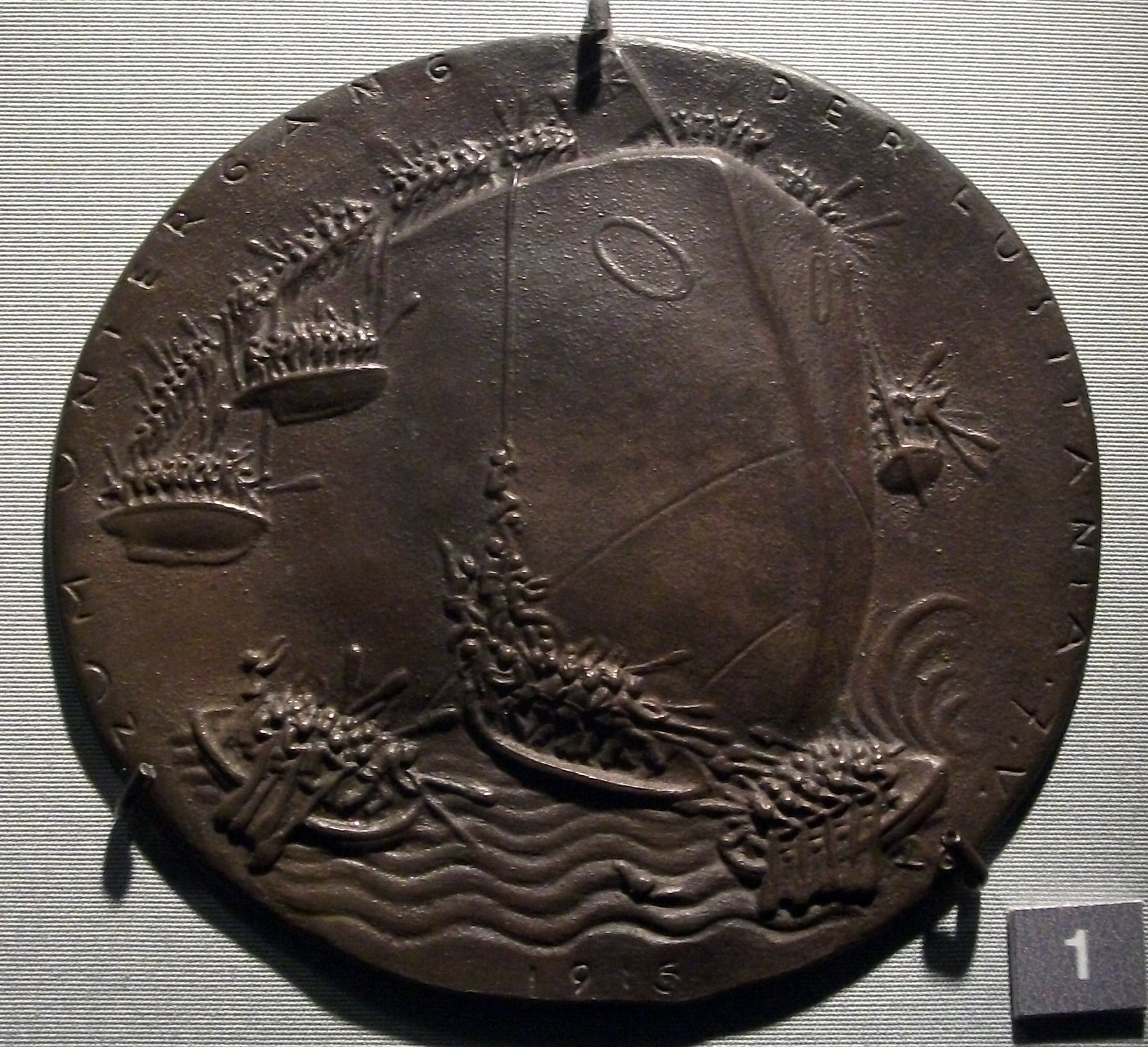
German commemorative medal by Ludwig Gies, 1915. Shows Lusitania packed with people, lowering lifeboats.

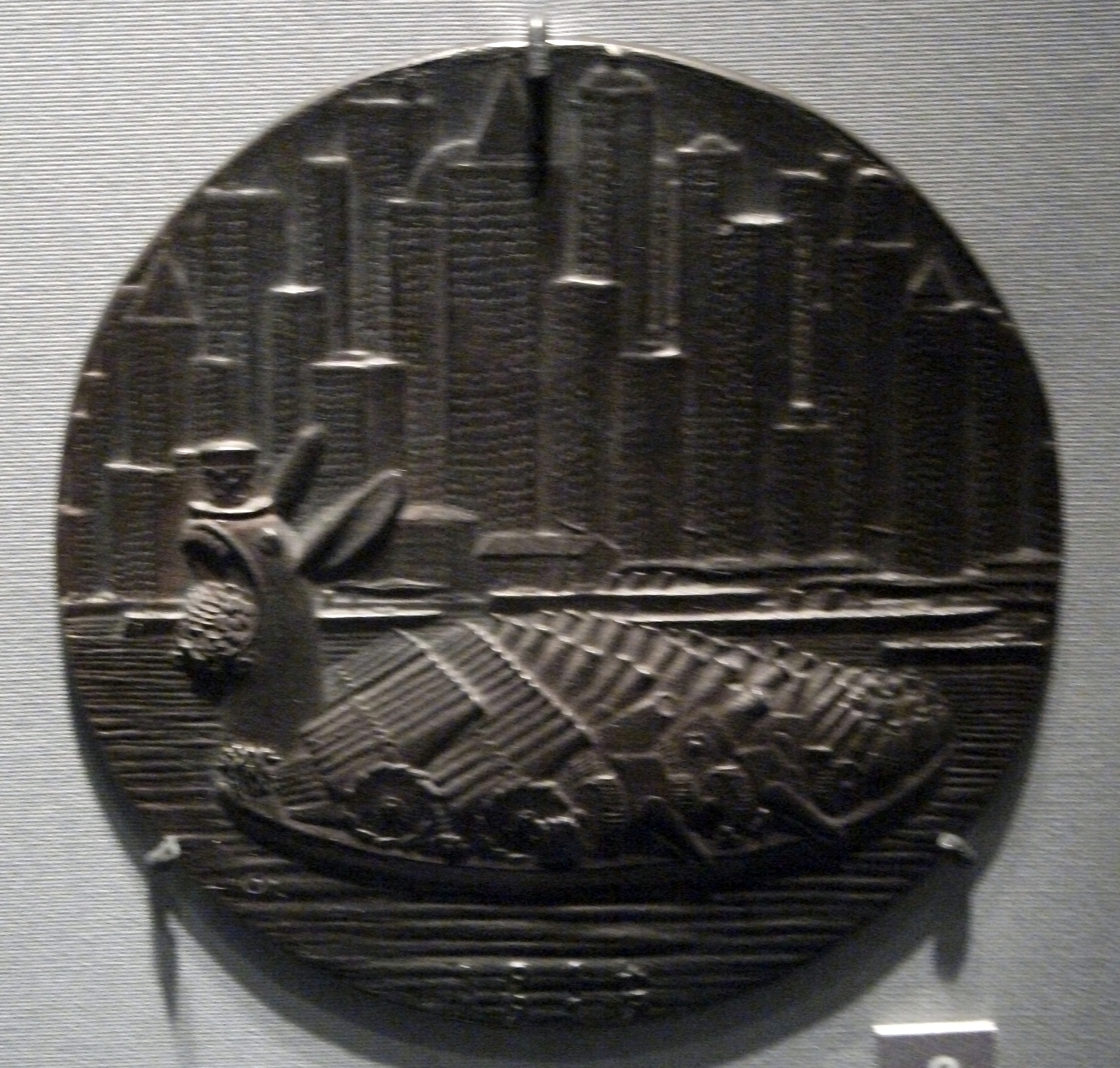
An unsympathetic later medal, also by Gies. Shows ship as a monster packed with weapons, mouth full of coins.

On 8 May Dr. Bernhard Dernburg, the former German Colonial Secretary and representative of the German Red Cross, made a statement in Cleveland, Ohio, in which he attempted to justify the sinking of Lusitania. Described by The New York Times as "the Kaiser's official mouthpiece", Dernburg was in fact acting as a private citizen with no official role in the German Foreign office, but had organised a New York "Press Bureau" to spread German propaganda since 1914. Dernburg said that because Lusitania "carried contraband of war" and also because she "was classed as an auxiliary cruiser" Germany had had a right to destroy her regardless of any passengers aboard. Dernburg further said that the warnings given by the German Embassy before her sailing, plus the 18 February note declaring the existence of "war zones" relieved Germany of any responsibility for the deaths of the American citizens aboard. He referred to the ammunition and military goods declared on Lusitania's manifest and said that "vessels of that kind" could be seized and destroyed under the Hague rules without any respect to a war zone.

The following day the German government issued an official communication regarding the sinking in which it said that the Cunard liner Lusitania "was yesterday torpedoed by a German submarine and sank", that Lusitania "was naturally armed with guns, as were recently most of the English mercantile steamers" and that "as is well known here, she had large quantities of war material in her cargo". This would be the official German line for the immediate aftermath.

The sinking was severely criticised by and met with disapproval in Turkey and Austria-Hungary, while in the German press, the sinking was deplored by Vorwärts, the daily newspaper of the Social Democratic Party of Germany, and also by Captain Persius, an outspoken naval critic who wrote for the Berliner Tageblatt. However much of the rest of the press approved of the sinking. One Catholic Centre Party newspaper, the Kölnische Volkszeitung, stated: "The sinking of the giant English steamship is a success of moral significance which is still greater than material success. With joyful pride we contemplate this latest deed of our Navy. It will not be the last. The English wish to abandon the German people to death by starvation. We are more humane. We simply sank an English ship with passengers who, at their own risk and responsibility, entered the zone of operations." The Frankfurter Zeitung wrote: "For the Germany Navy the sinking of the Lusitania means an extraordinary success. Its destruction demolished the last fable with which the people of England consoled themselves."

In a 13 July report on conditions in Germany, US ambassador James W. Gerard reported that due to the highly effective propaganda efforts of the Admiralty press bureau:

As to Germany’s war methods, they have the full approval of the people; the sinking of the Lusitania was universally approved, and even men like Von Gwinner, head of the German Bank, say they will treat the Mauretania in the same way if she comes out.

— James W. Gerard, 13 July 1915

Propaganda medals were made by a number of artists, including Ludwig Gies and in August 1915, the Munich medallist and sculptor Karl Goetz (Medailleur) (1875–1950). The latter privately struck a small run of medals as a limited-circulation satirical attack (fewer than 500 were struck) on the Cunard Line for trying to continue business as usual during wartime. Goetz blamed both the British government and the Cunard Line for allowing Lusitania to sail despite the German embassy's warnings. Popular demand led to many unauthorised copies being made. One side of the popular medal showed Lusitania sinking laden with guns (incorrectly depicted sinking stern first) with the motto "KEINE BANNWARE!" ("NO CONTRABAND!"), while the reverse showed a skeleton selling Cunard tickets with the motto "Geschäft Über Alles" ("Business Above All").

Goetz had put an incorrect date for the sinking on the medal, an error he later blamed on a mistake in a newspaper story about the sinking: instead of 7 May, he had put "5. Mai", two days before the actual sinking. Not realising his error, Goetz made copies of the medal and sold them in Munich and also to some numismatic dealers with whom he conducted business. This led to conspiracy theories. Realising his mistake, Goetz issued a corrected medal with the date of "7. Mai".

=== American ===
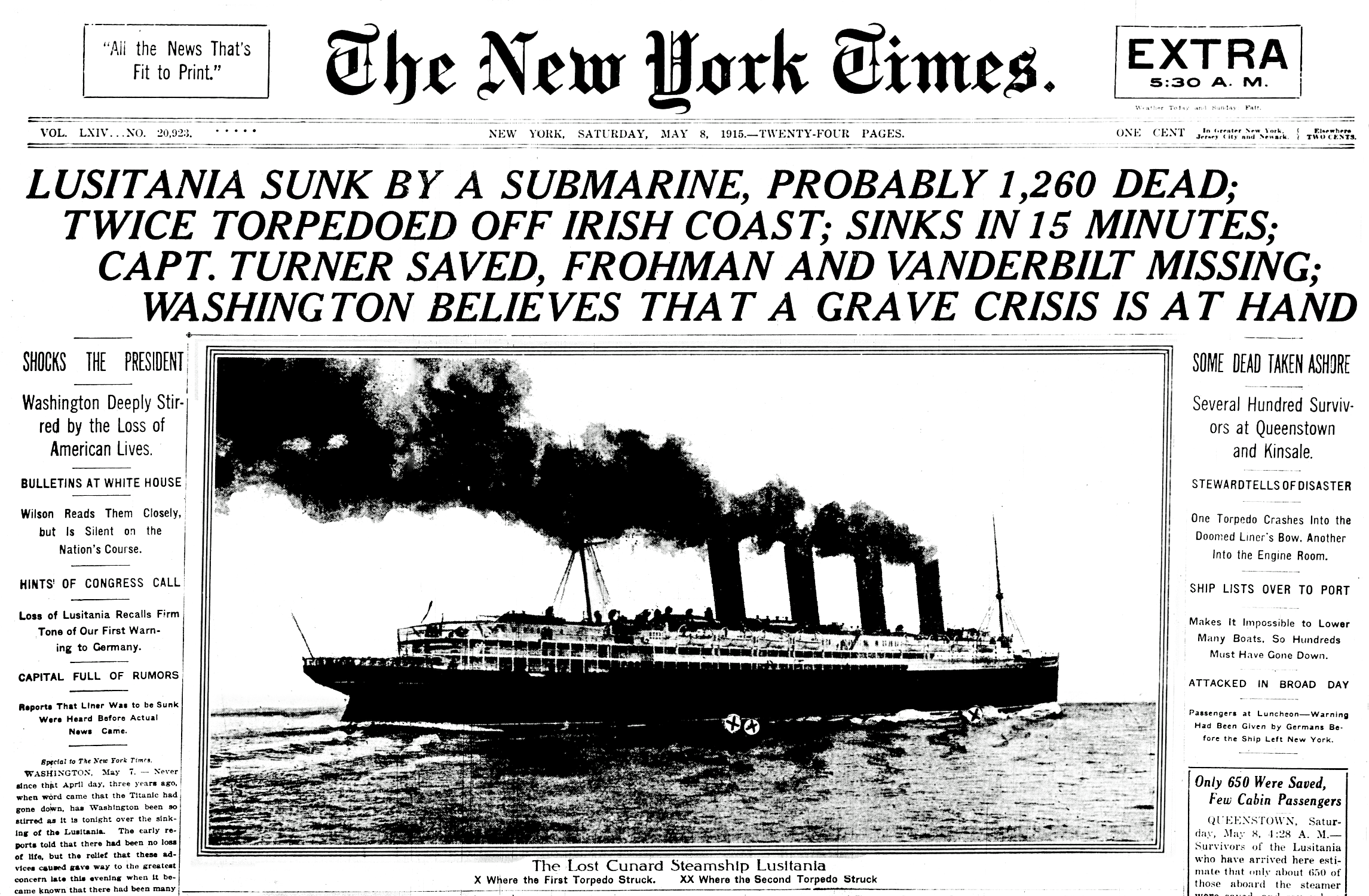
The New York Times article expressed the immediate recognition of the serious implications of the sinking, this lead story on 8 May having a section (below what is pictured here) titled "Nation's Course in Doubt".

Of the 159 US citizens aboard Lusitania, over a hundred lost their lives, and there was massive outrage in the United States, The Nation calling it "a deed for which a Hun would blush, a Turk be ashamed, and a Barbary pirate apologize". Dernburg's comments heightened public indignation, leading to German ambassador Bernstorff to advise him to leave. Former president Theodore Roosevelt commented on the issue, stating on 7 May:

...Deeds such as the sinking of the Lusitania.. represent nothing but mere piracy.

US president Woodrow Wilson urged restraint. He said at Philadelphia on 10 May 1915:

There is such a thing as a man being too proud to fight. There is such a thing as a nation being so right that it does not need to convince others by force that it is right.

The phrase "too proud to fight" then became mocked by pro-war and pro-Entente groups, as well as factions in Germany who believed there was no real threat of America going to war.

US authorities rebutted German claims. While it was true that Lusitania had been structurally designed for emplacing guns as part of government loan requirements during her construction, enabling rapid conversion into an armed merchant cruiser (AMC), and was listed as a "Royal Naval Reserve Merchant Vessel", the guns themselves were never fitted and the ships were not formally commissioned into the Navy. The great majority of British merchant ships were not armed, and indeed ships that were called up as Auxiliary Cruisers such as the SS Orduña had to at times be fitted with fake weaponry due to a shortage of guns.

Thus, Dudley Field Malone, Collector of the Port of New York, issued an official denial to the German charges, saying that he alongside other inspectors had personally inspected Lusitania before her departure and no guns were found, mounted or unmounted. He reported that he had seen no marked spaces or blocks on which guns might be mounted. Malone stated that no merchant ship would have been allowed to arm itself in the Port and leave the harbour. Assistant Manager of the Cunard Line, Herman Winter, denied the charge that she carried munitions:

She had aboard 4,200 cases of cartridges, but they were cartridges for small arms, packed in separate cases... they certainly do not come under the classification of ammunition. The United States authorities would not permit us to carry ammunition, classified as such by the military authorities, on a passenger liner. For years we have been sending small-arms cartridges abroad on the Lusitania.

In addition to the rifle cartridges, Lusitania carried also 1,250 cases of empty shells, and 18 cases of non-explosive fuses, all of which were listed in her manifest. However, US law revolved around the safety cargo posed to passengers and not Germany's strategic needs. Thus Winter's statement was in the context of US testing of small arms ammunition that found them to be "non-explosive in bulk", leading to a 1911 ruling that such ammunition can be transported without restriction on passenger ships, unlike explosives "likely to endanger the health or lives of the passengers or the safety of the vessel." Malone similarly stated that the ship did not contain explosives "within the interpretation of our statutes and regulations" by the US Department of Commerce and Labor.

=== Wilson, Lansing and Bryan ===
When Germany began its submarine campaign against Britain, Wilson had warned that the US would hold the German government strictly accountable for any violations of American rights. On 1 May, in response to Bernstorff's advert, he had stated that "no warning that an unlawful and inhumane act will be committed" could be accepted as a legitimate excuse for that act.

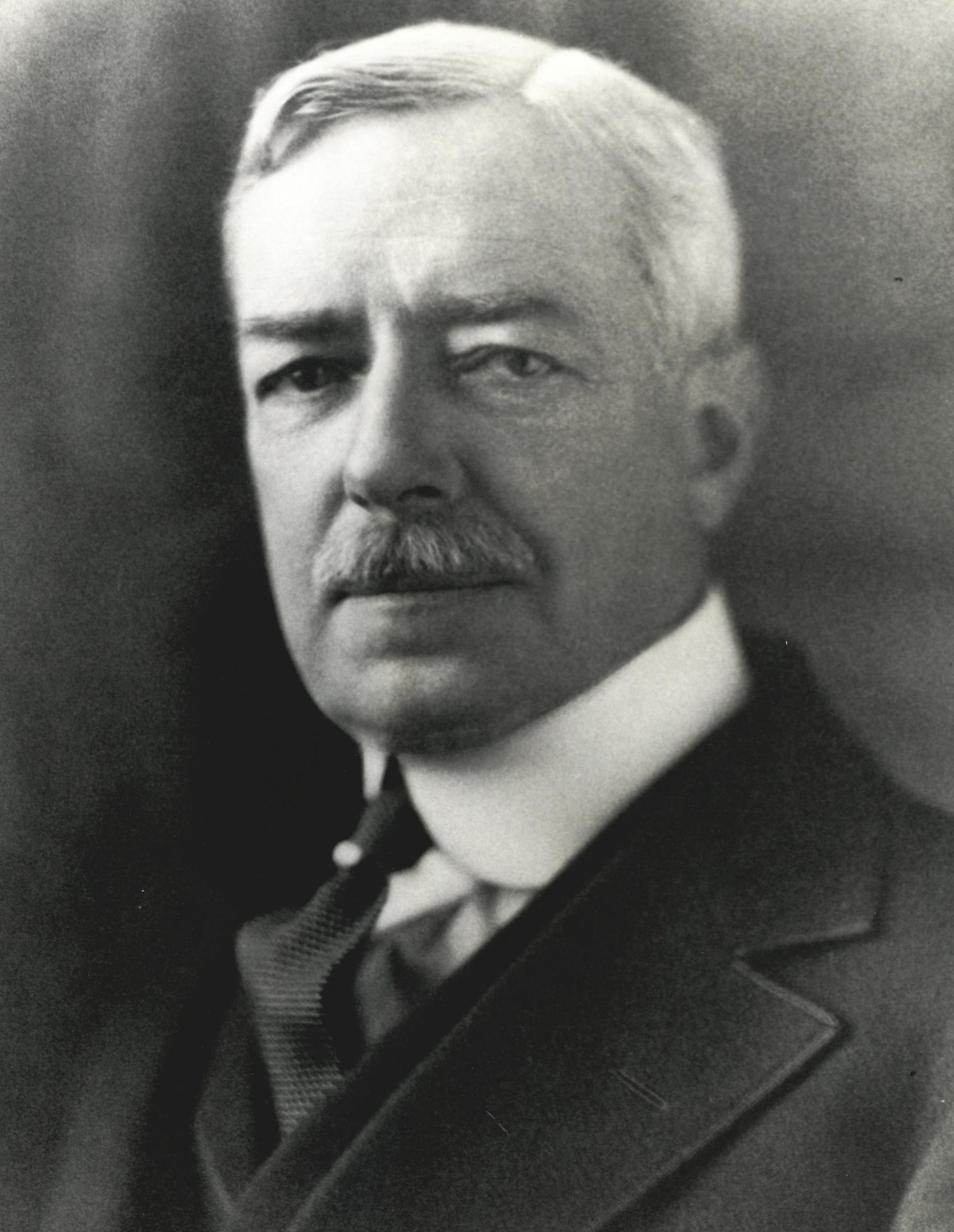
Robert Lansing would become US Secretary of State due to the crisis.

During the weeks after the sinking, the issue was hotly debated within the administration. Secretary of State William Jennings Bryan urged compromise and restraint. The US, he believed, should try to persuade the British to abandon their interdiction of foodstuffs and limit their mine-laying operations at the same time as the Germans were persuaded to curtail their submarine campaign. He also suggested that the US government issue an explicit warning against US citizens travelling on any belligerent ships, and ban contraband from being carried on passenger vessels.

In contrast, Counselor Robert Lansing advised Wilson to adhere to the "strict accountability" line. He first doubted that information about the cargo of Lusitania had actually been communicated to the submarine making the attack. But to Lansing, who had helped found the American Society of International Law, the issue was about principle, not facts. All that mattered was the German responsibility for the safety of the unresisting crew and passengers of the ship. Once it was confirmed that the ship was not armed and was attacked by surprise, no warning or strategic justification can allow the violation of "the principles of law and humanity". The US was already committed to this approach, had never previously warned passengers to not travel on British ships and saying so now would be an abandonment of the government's responsibility to protect its citizens.

Despite being sympathetic to Bryan's antiwar feelings, Wilson found Lansing's arguments "unanswerable". Thus he resolved to insist that the German government must apologise for the sinking, compensate US victims, and promise to avoid any similar occurrence in the future. Wilson made his position clear in three notes to the German government issued on 13 May, 9 June, and 21 July.

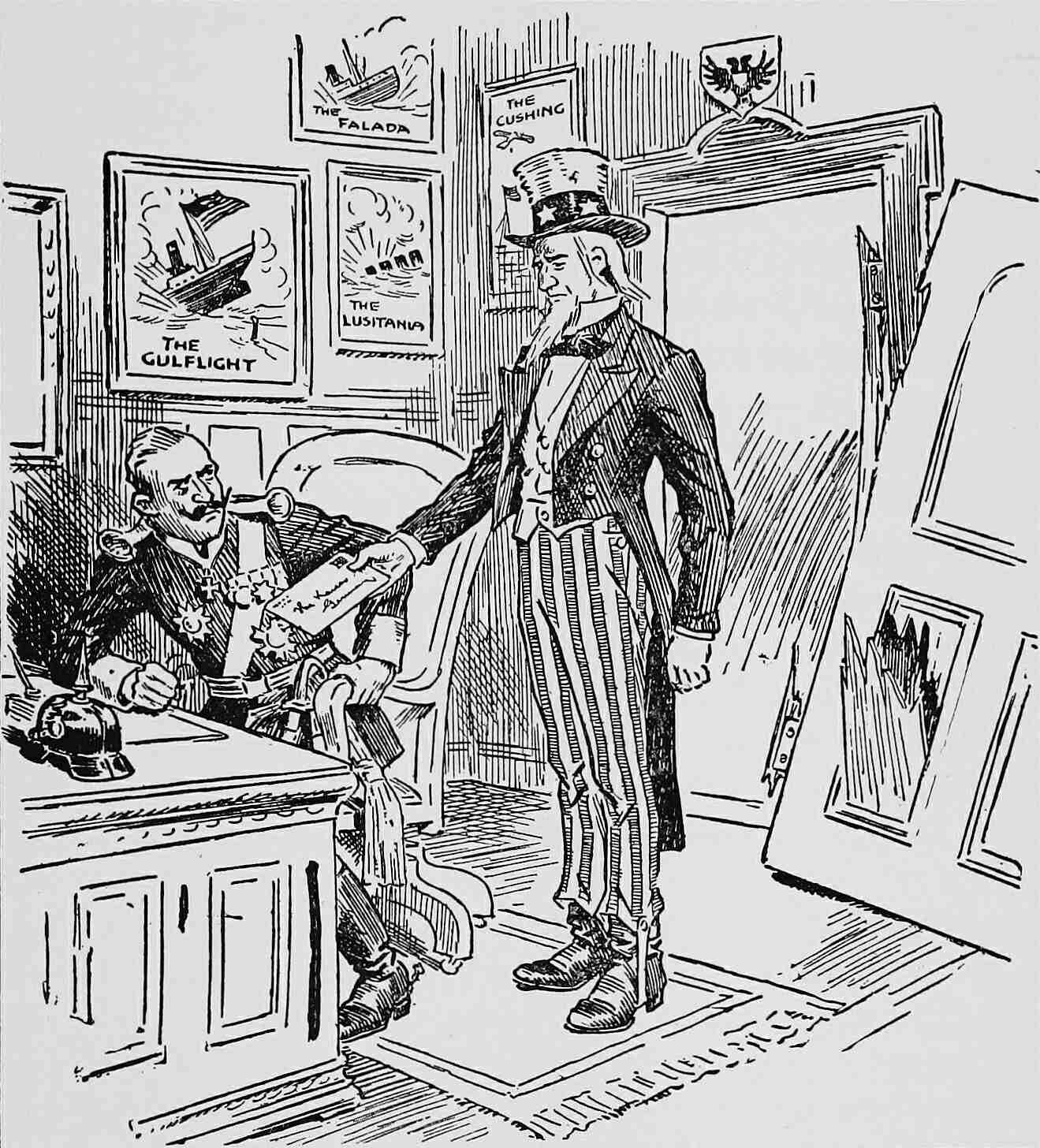
"A letter from the president of the United States". Contemporary US political cartoon

The first note, (citing attacks on 3 other ships: Falaba, Cushing, and Gulflight) affirmed the right of Americans to travel as passengers on merchant ships of any nationality, reaffirmed the doctrine of strict accountability. As the Germans were claiming that it was impossible to conduct submarine warfare against merchant vessels "without disregarding those rules of fairness, reason, justice, and humanity which all modern opinion regards as imperative", "manifestly, submarines cannot be used against merchantmen". Bryan discredited himself when he told Austro-Hungarian ambassador Konstantin Dumba that the American protest was only for the benefit of US public opinion and its sharp tone should be disregarded. A defensive German response came on 28 May.

In the second note, in a reply to the German response, Wilson flatly rejected the German defenses. The vessel was not armed, the cargo was legal under American law, and all these questions were immaterial as to the core issue – the means of the ship's destruction.

Whatever be the other facts regarding the Lusitania, the principle fact is that a great steamer, primarily and chiefly a conveyance for passengers, and carrying more than a thousand souls who had no part or lot in the conduct of the war, was torpedoed and sunk without so much as a challenge or warning, and that men, women and children were sent to their death in circumstances unparalleled in modern warfare.

The fact that more than one hundred American citizens were among those who perished made it the duty of the Government of the United States to speak of these things and once more, with solemn emphasis, to call the attention of the Imperial German Government to the grave responsibility which the Government of the United States conceives that it has incurred in this tragic occurrence, and to the indisputable principle upon which that responsibility rests.

The Government of the United States is contending for something much greater than mere rights of property or privileges of commerce. It is contending for nothing less high and sacred than the rights of humanity, which every Government honors itself in respecting and which no Government is justified in resigning on behalf of those under its care and authority.

Only her actual resistance to capture or refusal to stop when ordered to do so for the purpose of visit could have afforded the commander of the submarine any justification for so much as putting the lives of those on board the ship in jeopardy. This principle the Government of the United States understands the explicit instructions issued on August 3, 1914, by the Imperial German Admiralty to its commanders at sea to have recognized and embodied, as do the naval codes of all other nations, and upon it every traveler and seaman had a right to depend.

It is upon this principle of humanity as well as upon the law founded upon this principle that the United States must stand.

— President Wilson

Bryan considered the second note too provocative and refused to sign, and so resigned as secretary of state. He was replaced by Lansing. Lansing later said in his memoirs that due to the tragedy he always had the "conviction that we [the United States] would ultimately become the ally of Britain".

In the third note, of 21 July, in reply to a more conciliatory German note on 12 July, Wilson (advised by Lansing) made clear that the US considered British transgressions of neutral rights to be more minor in degree, and issued an ultimatum to the effect that the US would regard any subsequent sinkings as "deliberately unfriendly". The note however indicated that Wilson would accept submarine warfare if it followed the "accepted practice of regulated warfare", observing that much of German submarine attacks had been conducted under the established cruiser rules anyway. Thus, while the American public and leadership were not ready for war, a line in the sand had been drawn as a result of the sinking of Lusitania. Later key crises related to the sinking of Arabic and the Sussex incident.

=== German policy reversal ===
While outwardly Germany conducted a propaganda skirmish, internally there had long been a faction opposed to the new submarine war. Ambassador Johann Heinrich von Bernstorff himself had privately concluded that the campaign was of questionable legality and against Germany's best interests. Contrary to Germany's official defenses, Bernstorff believed that Lusitania could not have been targeted specifically, and that it was "obviously sound policy to refrain as far as possible from any attack on passenger ships". Bernstorff saw his role as preserving diplomatic relations with the US "under all circumstances", and frequently acted without instruction from Berlin.

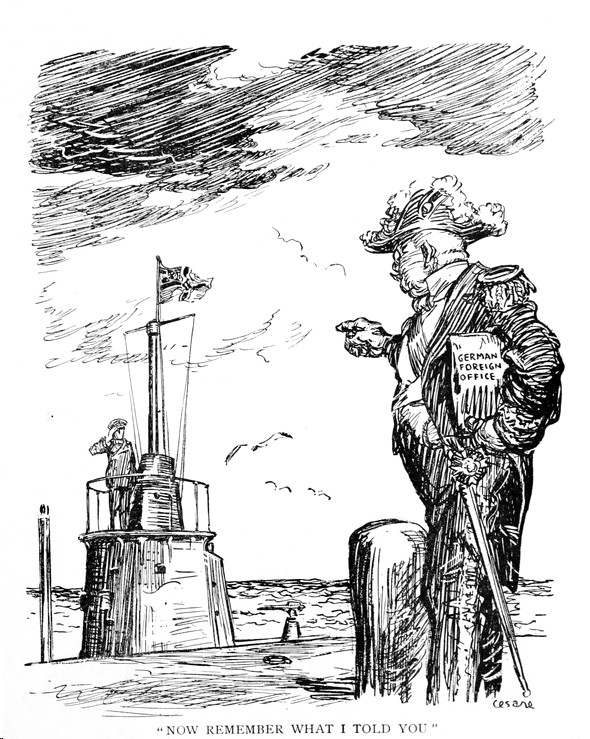
Now remember what I told you. Newspaper cartoon by Oscar Cesare commenting on German Foreign Office-led restrictions on submarine warfare, 1915–1916.

Within Germany there was a fierce debate between German chancellor Theobald von Bethmann Hollweg, and pro-submarine naval officials like Tirpitz and Gustav Bachmann. Tirpitz, who saw the Americans as no threat, had pushed for the official German line on the munitions issue, focusing on inciting German public opinion at the expense of the relationship with the US. The chancellor enlisted the help of Army Chief of Staff Erich von Falkenhayn, who advised the Kaiser on the danger a break with the Americans would pose. The Kaiser thus ordered on 6 June that secret directives be sent that rescinded Bachmann's order to deliberately target enemy passenger vessels and stated that deliberate attacks on large ocean liners would cease. The admirals had also counted on "accidentally" sinking a few neutral ships to deter the others, but now, if the nationality of a ship is in doubt, attacks should be aborted. Tirpitz and Bachmann offered their resignations, but they were rejected by the Kaiser. To preserve the prestige of the German military, not even Ambassador Bernstorff was told.

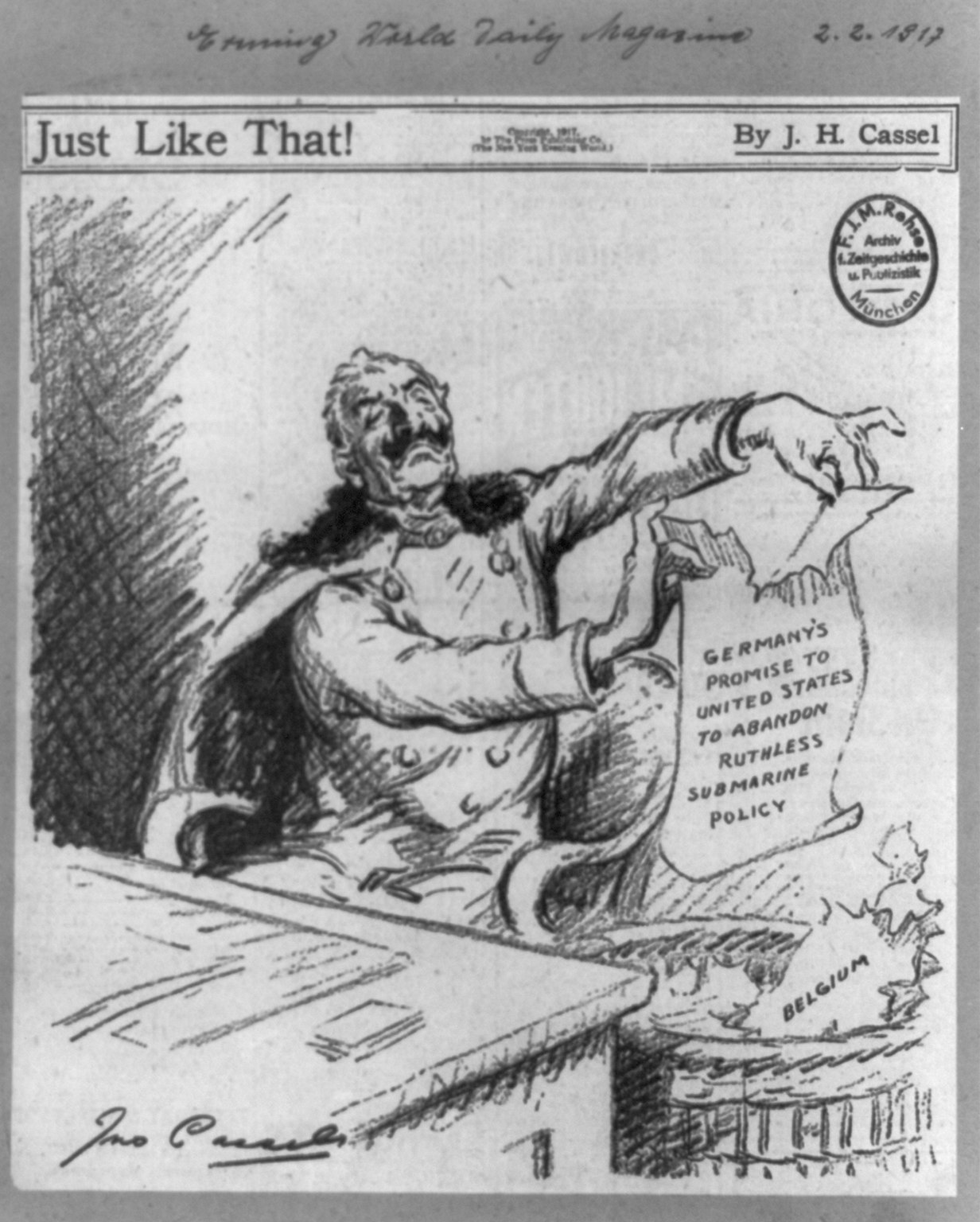
Just like that, 1917 cartoon depicting Wilhelm II ripping apart Germany's promises to "abandon ruthless submarine policy"

Nevertheless, passenger ships continued to be attacked. The liner Arabic was sunk on 19 August. The ship was sailing outward from Britain, and so clearly not transporting contraband of any sort, further angering the Americans. With increasing evidence of the ineffectiveness of the U-boat campaign, which was originally promised to force the British to the negotiating table in six weeks, Bethmann Hollweg petitioned the Kaiser to publicly forbid attacks without warning against all passenger ships. He said the Germans should work with the Americans, pledging to limit submarines to cruiser rules if the British adopt the Declaration of London and thus loosen the blockade. There was once again disagreement over this move from the navy's admirals (headed by Alfred von Tirpitz), who had no interest in the Declaration if it would prevent them from using submarines fully. On 27 August, Falkenhayn and anxious messages from Bernstorff persuaded Kaiser Wilhelm II to endorse the chancellor's solution. Bachmann was forced to resign, Tirpitz lost direct access to the Kaiser, and the end of unrestricted submarine warfare against passenger ships was made public to the Americans on 1 September.

As the German government was pondering other orders, on 18 September the new head of the Admiralty Staff, Henning von Holtzendorff, rendered these arrangements moot by giving an order on his own authority: all U-boats operating in the English Channel and off the west coast of the United Kingdom were recalled, and the U-boat war would continue only in the North Sea, where it would be conducted under the Prize Law rules. Thus, Pohl's U-boat experiment was called off entirely. This would be the situation until the end of the following February, where a brief intensification of U-boat commerce attacks would lead to the attack on SS Sussex on 24 March 1916, and the Sussex Pledge to adhere only to cruiser rules.

At the end of January 1917, Germany announced it would now conduct full unrestricted submarine warfare, deliberately breaking its prior promises. Once again, Wilson was furious. Also, the Zimmermann telegram, in which Germany proposed inciting Mexico to attack the US, was intercepted by British intelligence and revealed. Thus on 6 April 1917, Congress declared war on Germany. While US participation was at first small, two million American troops eventually arrived in Europe for the decisive battles in 1918.

=== British ===
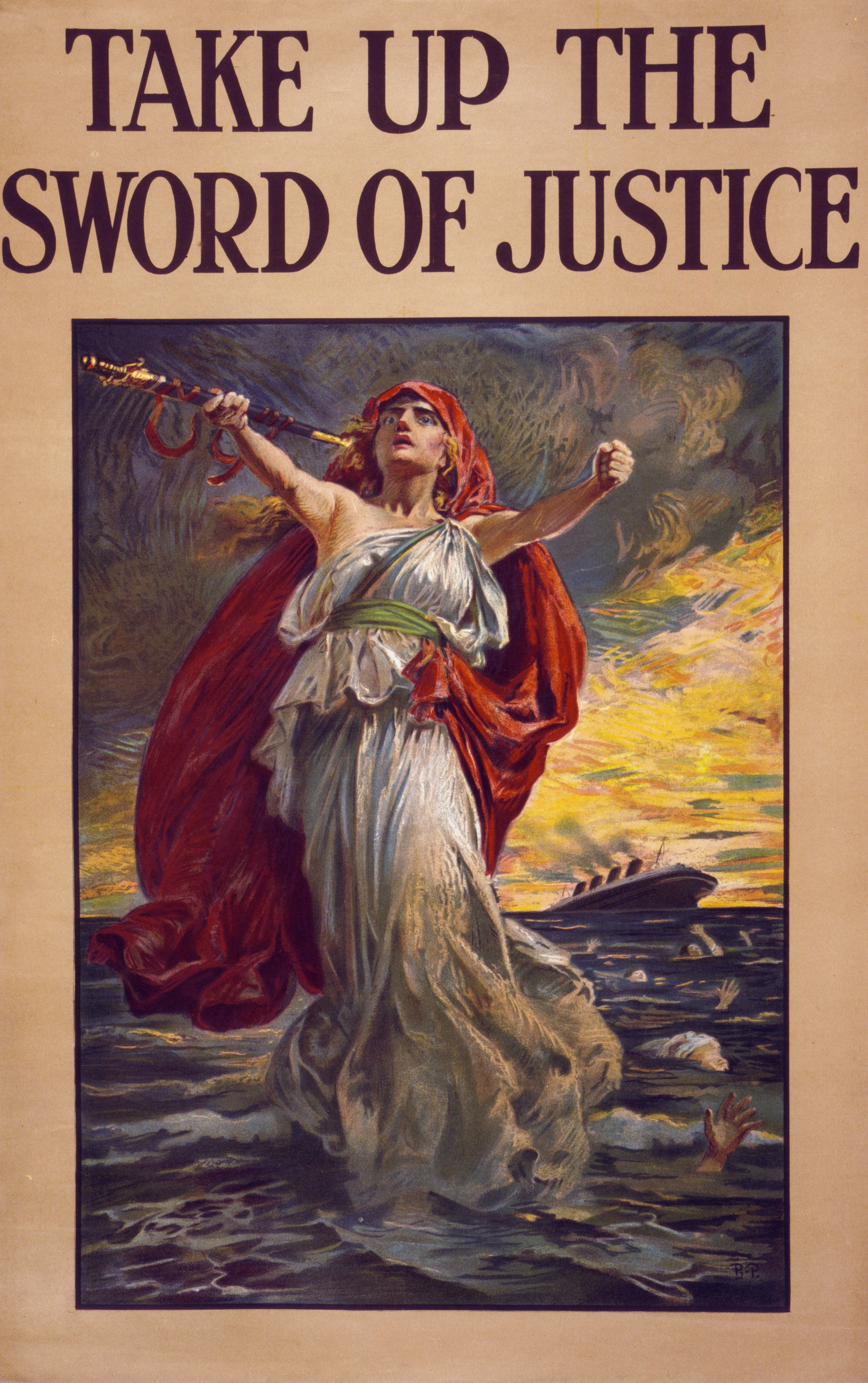
Take Up the Sword of Justice, a UK propaganda poster with Lusitania in the background

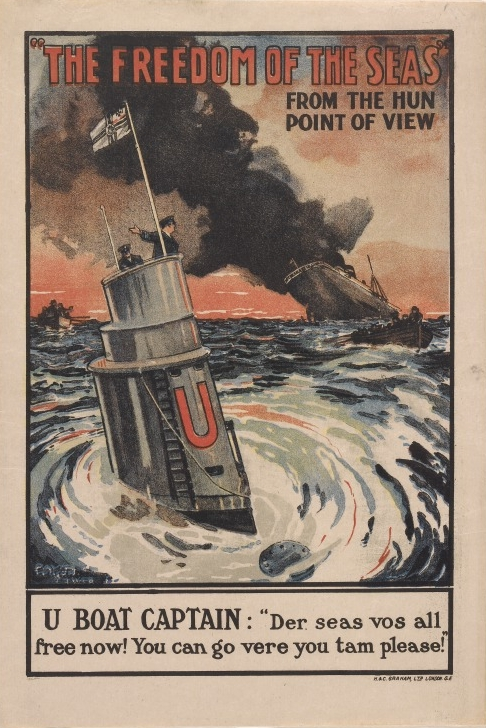
The Freedom of the Seas. From the Hun Point of View British propaganda poster

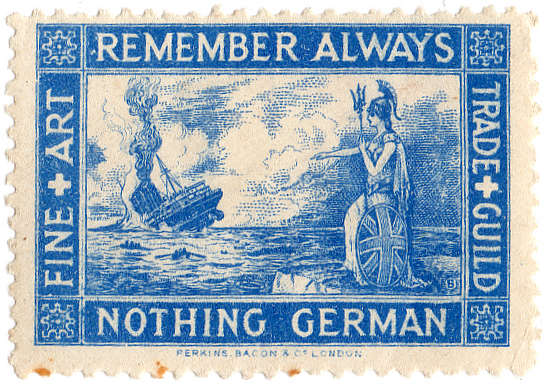
Remember Always, Nothing German, First World War propaganda stamp

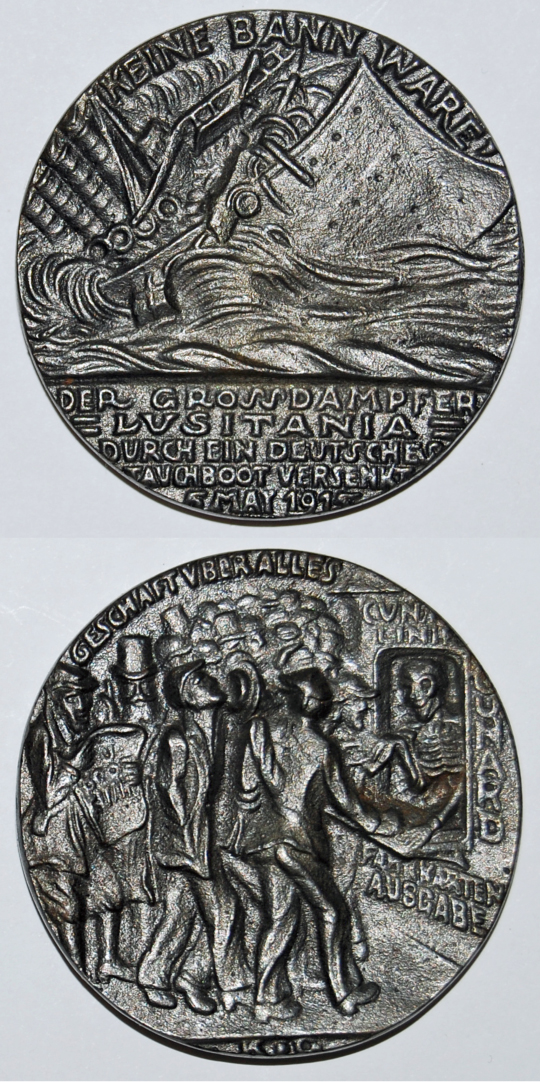
British replica of the Goetz Lusitania medal. Unlike the original Goetz medals which were sand-cast from bronze, the British copies were of diecast iron and were of poorer quality. The English version was altered to read 'May' rather than 'Mai', and originals usually have "KGoetz" on the edge.

The British press highlighted the savagery of the Germans, condemning Schwieger as a war criminal. Thanks to the Defence of the Realm Act, matters relating to the ship's cargo were censored. References to Lusitania appeared heavily in propaganda, and helped motivate the later Baralong incidents. According to Kurt Hahn, the sinking was a decisive turning point in the collective English attitude towards Germany.

British ambassador Sir Cecil Spring-Rice was concerned about the tone of the British press and that the US should best be kept out of the war. Writing on May 9, he expressed that "our main interest is to preserve the US as a base of supplies. I hope language of our press will be very guarded."

According to US ambassador Walter Hines Page, the British did not want US military help, but they felt America "falls short morally" in insufficiently condemning German methods and character. America thus should at least break relations with Germany temporarily. British propaganda was thus also aimed at America, with the sinking concurrent with the Bryce report on German atrocities. One over-enthusiastic propagandist's fabricated story was circulated that in some regions of Germany, schoolchildren were given a holiday to celebrate the sinking of Lusitania. This story was so effective that James W. Gerard, the US ambassador to Germany, recounted it being told in his memoir of his time in Germany, Face to Face with Kaiserism (1918), though without vouching for its validity.

Another ploy was the reproduction of the Goetz medal, which was done by department store entrepreneur Harry Gordon Selfridge at the behest of Lord Newton, in charge of Propaganda at the Foreign Office in 1916. The replica medals were produced in an attractive case and were sold for a shilling apiece. On the cases it was stated that the medals had been distributed in Germany "to commemorate the sinking of Lusitania" and they came with a propaganda leaflet which denounced the Germans and used the medal's incorrect date (5 May) to incorrectly claim that the sinking of Lusitania was premeditated, rather than just being incident to Germany's larger plan to sink any ship in a combat zone without warning. The head of the Lusitania Souvenir Medal Committee later estimated that 250,000 were sold, proceeds being given to the Red Cross and St Dunstan's Blinded Soldiers and Sailors Hostel. Many popular magazines and newspapers ran photographs of the replica or the original, and it was falsely claimed that it had been awarded to the crew of the U-boat.

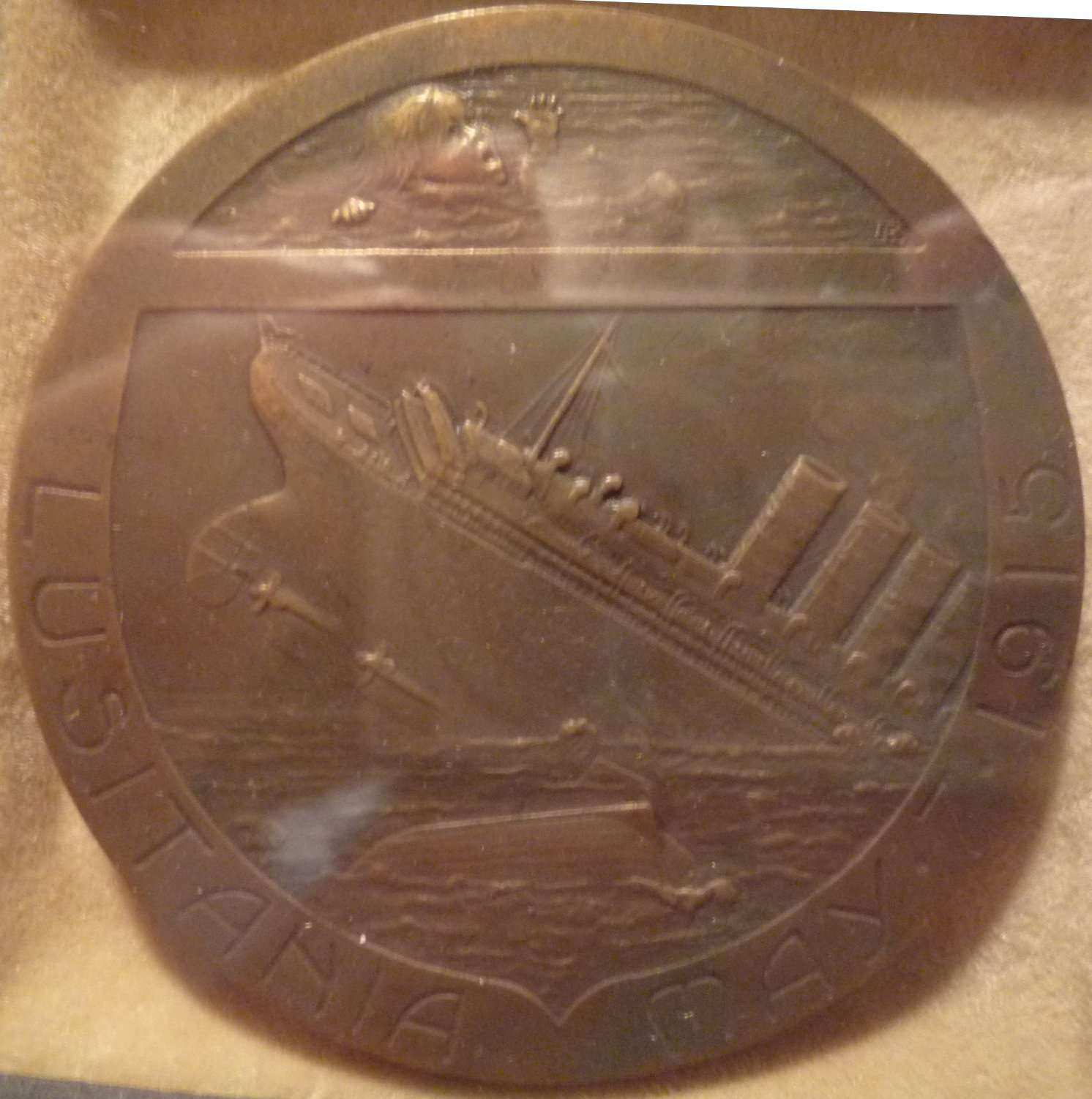
Reverse of the Baudichon medal

The Bavarian government, alarmed at the strong worldwide reaction to Goetz's work, suppressed further production of the original medal and ordered confiscation in April 1917. After the war Goetz expressed his regret that his work had been the cause of increasing anti-German feelings, but it remains a celebrated propaganda act. After the war, in around 1920, the French medallist René Baudichon created a counterblast to the Goetz medal. The Baudichon medal is in bronze, 54 millimetres (2.1 in) diameter and weighs 79.51 grams (2.805 oz). The obverse shows Liberty as depicted on the Statue of Liberty but holding a raised sword and rising from a stormy sea. Behind her the sun is breaking through clouds and six ships are steaming. Signed R Baudichon. Legend: Ultrix America Juris, 1917 U.S.A 1918 (America avenger of right). The reverse shows a view of the starboard quarter of Lusitania correctly depicted sinking bow first. In the foreground there is a capsized lifeboat. The upper field shows a child drowning, head, hands and feet above the water; RB monogram. Legend: Lusitania May 7, 1915.

== Cultural legacy ==
=== Film ===
American cartoonist Winsor McCay spent nearly two years making The Sinking of the Lusitania (1918), at the time the longest animated film, and the oldest existing animated documentary

There is no footage of the sinking.

- Animation pioneer Winsor McCay spent nearly two years animating the disaster for his film The Sinking of the Lusitania (1918). At 12 minutes, it was the longest animated film on record at the time. It was also the earliest-known dramatic animation.
- The docudrama Sinking of the Lusitania: Terror at Sea (2007) depicts the last voyage of the Lusitania and the political and military decisions that led to the sinking.
- The National Geographic documentary Dark Secrets of the Lusitania (2012) describes an expedition investigating the wreck made by Greg Bemis and a crew of divers in 2011.
- Wireless operator David McCormick took photos of the Lusitania as it sank; McCormick survived and while a lot of the film was destroyed upon impact with the water, some of the images from earlier that day survived.

=== Wreck artefacts ===
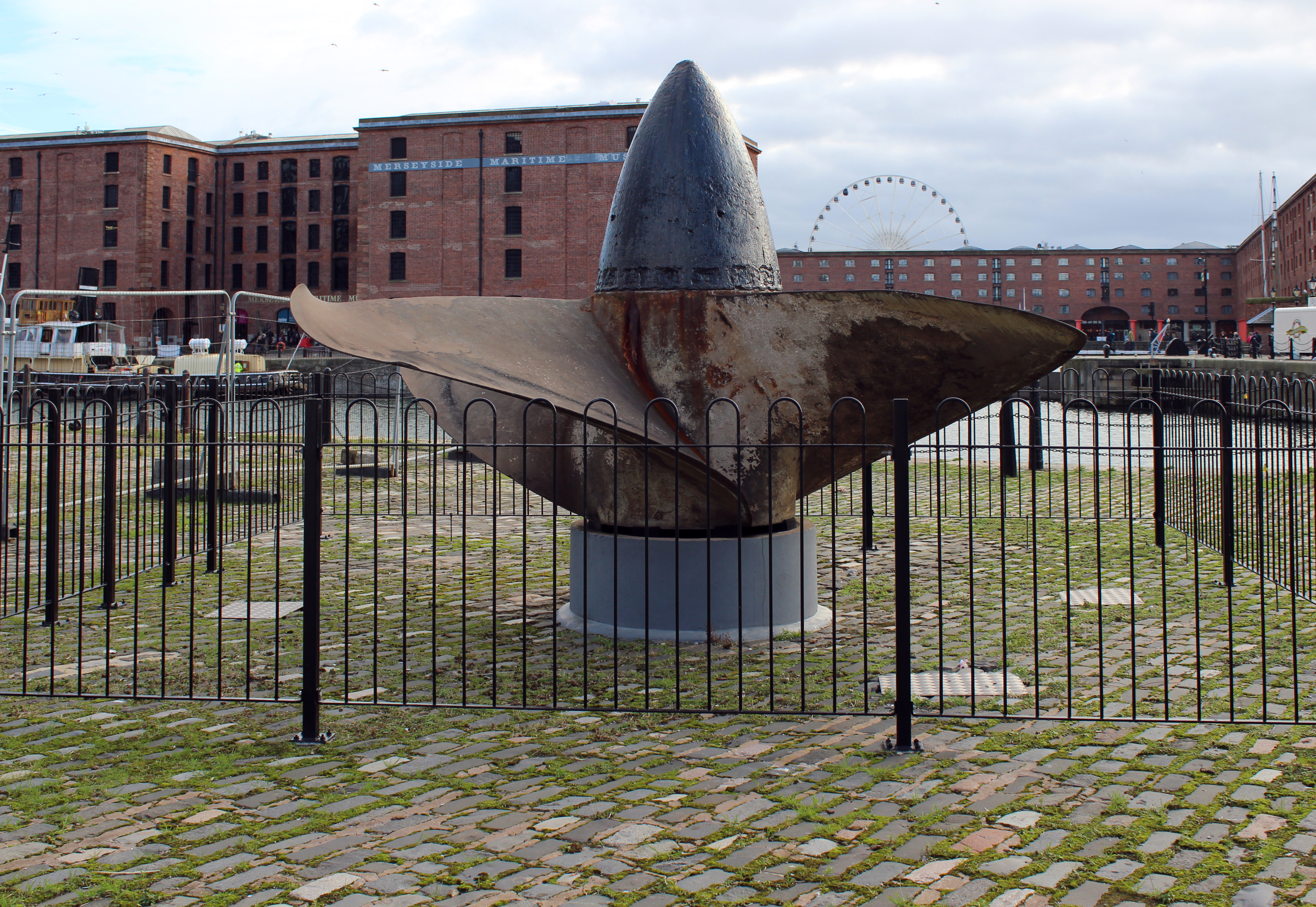
One of the three propellers from Lusitania that were salvaged from the wreck in 1982 is now on display as a memorial at Merseyside Maritime Museum in Liverpool, England.

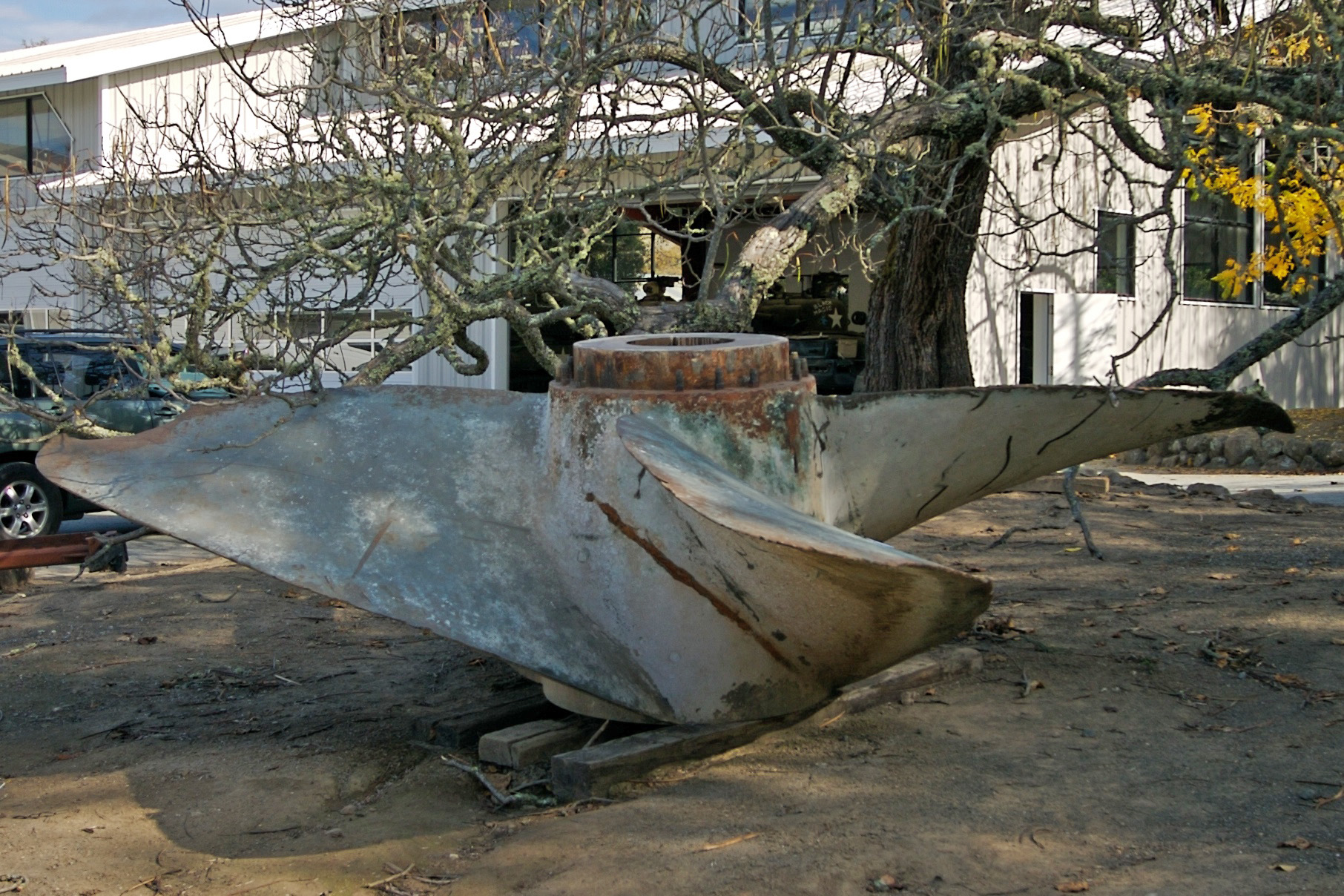
One of the three propellers from Lusitania

- The Merseyside Maritime Museum in Liverpool, which was the home port of the Cunard line, has a large exhibit about Lusitania sinking. In 1982 one of the ship's four-bladed propellers was raised from the wreck; it is now on permanent display at the Royal Albert Dock.
- A propeller from the wreck is on display at the Hilton Anatole in Dallas, Texas.
- Another salvaged propeller from the ship was melted down to create golf clubs in the 1980s.
- A lifeboat davit and some other artefacts are displayed at the Lusitania Museum & Old Head Signal Tower on Old Head of Kinsale.
- The original builder's model of Lusitania, repainted after the sinking to represent RMS Mauretania, is displayed at the Maritime Museum of the Atlantic in Halifax, Nova Scotia.

=== Literature ===
- H.P. Lovecraft's first published book was The Crime of Crimes: Lusitania 1915 (published in Wales), a poem on the sinking of the vessel.
- George Ansel Sterling Ryerson was poet George Sterling's first cousin once removed on the poet's father's side. Ryerson's wife Mary and daughter Laura were on the Lusitania when it was sunk. His daughter survived; his wife did not. Sterling wrote the sonnet "The Lusitania" to commemorate the first anniversary of the sinking. The poem was published in a magazine in 1916 and in Sterling's book The Caged Eagle and Other Poems that same year.
- The events of Agatha Christie's 1922 novel The Secret Adversary are set off by the sinking of Lusitania.
- David Butler's novel Lusitania (1982) is a fictionalised account of the sinking and events leading up to it.
- The sinking was the inspiration for Michael Morpurgo's novel Listen to the Moon (2014).
- Dead Wake: The Last Crossing of the Lusitania (2015), by Erik Larson, is a nonfiction work written in a narrative style. The book covers many facets of life during the early years of World War I, including the private affairs of President Wilson, what life was like on a German U-boat, and many vignettes of survivors and victims on board the ship. The notes and bibliography cover pages 362-418.
- A majority of Kim Izzo's Seven Days in May (2017) takes place aboard the Lusitania. The historical fiction alternates between a group of people on board, including Alfred Vanderbilt and Charles Frohman, and in a secret room in Whitehall in London, where coded messages are being intercepted.
- The Glass Ocean (2019), written by Karen White, Lauren Willig and Beatriz Williams, rotates narrators and time periods. One of the storylines takes place aboard the Lusitania. It is a fictional account from a passenger's perspective, and weaves in with storylines told in 2013.
- Fateful Decisions (2017), a historical fiction novel, by Trevor D'Silva, has the three main characters meeting on the Lusitania in the first chapter. They survive the sinking and their lives are once again intertwined when America enters World War I.
- In the Pulitzer-winning novel Angel Down (2025), written by Daniel Kraus, the main character's father dies in the sinking of the Lusitania.

=== Music ===
- The composer Frank Bridge, a pacifist horrified by the First World War, composed Lament (for Catherine, aged 9 "Lusitania" 1915), for string orchestra, to commemorate the loss of the ship. It premiered by the New Queen's Hall Orchestra, conducted by Bridge, on 15 September, at the 1915 Proms, as part of a programme of "Popular Italian music", the rest of which was conducted by Henry Wood.
- Charles Ives's Orchestral Set No. 2 ends with a movement titled, From Hanover Square North, at the End of a Tragic Day, the Voice of the People Again Arose. In the piece, Ives recalls his experience of waiting for a train in New York City as news reports of the sinking come through. The waiting crowd sing "In The Sweet By and By", picking up the tune from a barrel organ. Their voices can be heard at the start of the piece, and the hymn tune itself appears at the end.
- A popular song, "As the Lusitania Went Down" (1915) by Arthur J. Lamb and F. Henri Klickmann was published by C. K. Root & Co. of Chicago and New York. It was described by The Music Trade Review on 29 May 1915 as "One of the most interesting of the songs that have made their appearance in the commemoration of the Lusitania disaster."
- The song "When the Lusitania Went Down" (1915) by Charles McCarron and Nat Vincent was published by Leo Feist, in New York. Columbia Records issued a recording sung by baritone Herbert Stuart (otherwise known as Albert Wiederhold) and with orchestra accompaniment, as an 80 rpm disc.
- The song "Lusitania" from American black metal band Minenwerfer, on their second album Nihilistischen.
- "Lusitania" from American singer-songwriter Andrew Bird. The song features vocals by Annie Clark of St. Vincent.
- The song "Dead Wake" from post-hardcore band Thrice.
- The song "Lusitania" from post-hardcore band June of 44 from the album Tropics and Meridians.

== Controversies ==
=== Cruiser rules and Admiralty instructions ===
The "prize rules" or "cruiser rules", based in customary law and influenced by the Hague Conventions of 1899 and 1907 and the 1909 London Declaration concerning the Laws of Naval War, governed the seizure of vessels at sea during wartime. Although changes in technology such as radio and the submarine eventually made parts of them irrelevant, they were generally acknowledged at the start of the war. Merchant ships were to be warned by warships, and their passengers and crew allowed to abandon ship before they were sunk, unless the ship resisted or tried to escape, or was in a convoy protected by warships. Limited armament on a merchant ship, such as one or two guns, did not necessarily affect the ship's immunity to attack without warning, and neither did a cargo of munitions or materiel.

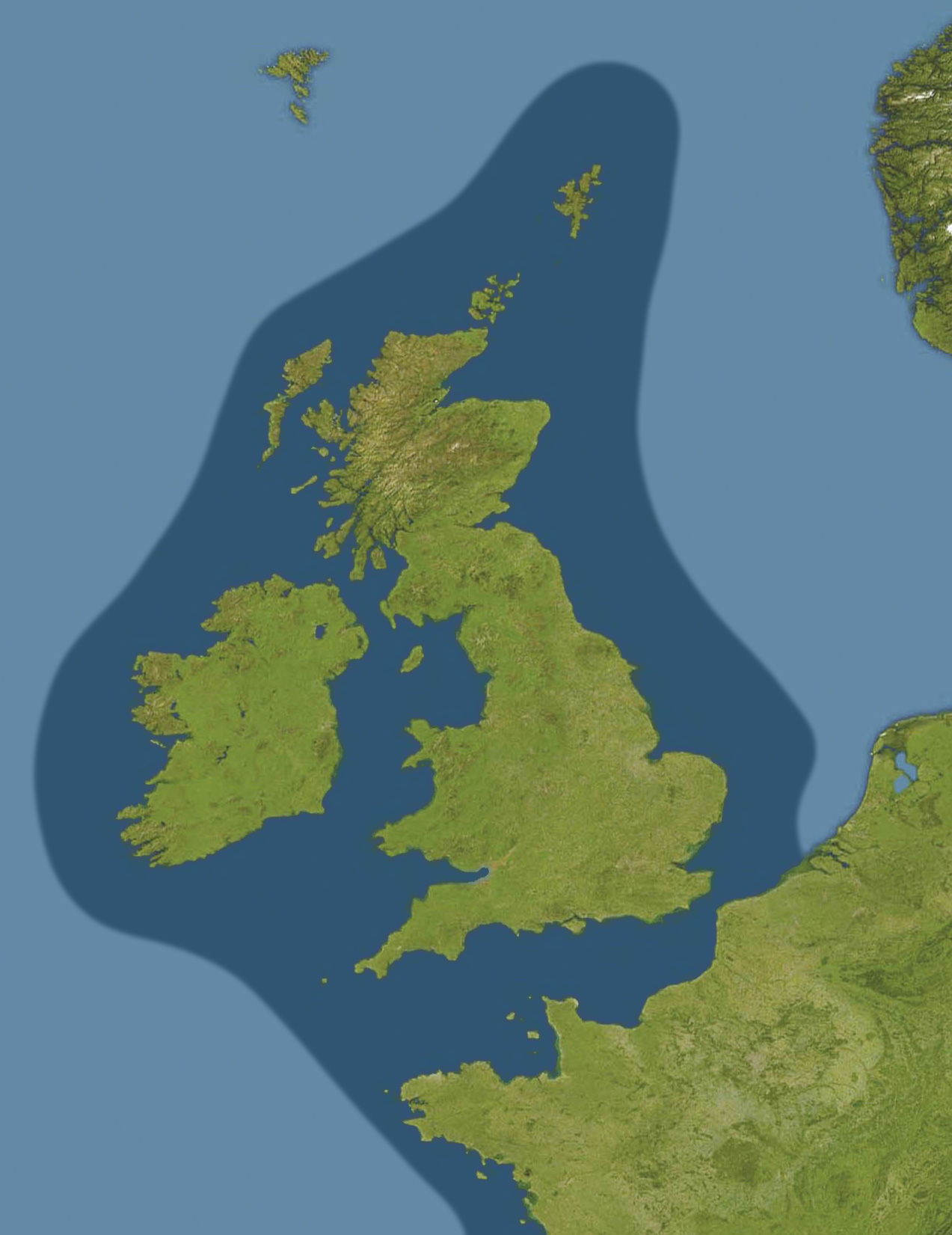
Germany's declared "war zone". From 18 February 1915, all Allied ships within would be liable to attack, possibly without warning.

Debates between the German Admiralty and the German government over unrestricted submarine warfare had been ongoing since 1914, with senior naval figures proposing that it would swiftly and easily win the war. In November 1914 the British announced that due to German placement of mines, the entire North Sea was now a "military area", and issued orders restricting the passage of neutral shipping into and through the North Sea to special channels where supervision would be possible (the other approaches having been mined). Taking advantage of this and the British Admiralty's order of 31 January 1915 that British merchant ships should fly neutral colours as a ruse de guerre, Admiral Hugo von Pohl, commander of the German High Seas Fleet and outgoing chief of the Admiralty, acted outside of the normal protocols and declared an abandonment of cruiser rules, publishing a warning in the Deutscher Reichsanzeiger (Imperial German Gazette) on 4 February 1915:

(1) The waters around Great Britain and Ireland, including the whole of the English Channel, are hereby declared to be a War Zone. From February 18 onwards every enemy merchant vessel encountered in this zone will be destroyed, nor will it always be possible to avert the danger thereby threatened to the crew and passengers. (2) Neutral vessels also will run a risk in the War Zone, because in view of the hazards of sea warfare and the British authorization of January 31 of the misuse of neutral flags, it may not always be possible to prevent attacks on enemy ships from harming neutral ships.

Despite wrangling in the German government to limit the scope of the navy's proposed strategy, privately, directives went further, with Admiral Gustav Bachmann directing submarine captains to attack passenger vessels, so as to obtain a shock effect and deter shipping.

International reaction was negative, with many considering the announcement a bluff. Most considered cruiser rules to be still valid, even beyond the end of the war. Nevertheless, in response, the British Admiralty issued orders on 10 February 1915 which directed merchant ships to escape from hostile U-boats when possible, but "if a submarine comes up suddenly close ahead of you with obvious hostile intention, steer straight for her at your utmost speed... [...] she will probably dive, in which case you will have ensured your safety..." Further instructions ten days later advised armed steamers to open fire on a submarine that is "obviously pursuing with hostile intentions", even if it had not yet fired. Private individuals offered bounties for submarines sunk. Given the vulnerability of a submarine to ramming or even small-calibre shellfire, a U-boat that surfaced and gave warning against a merchantman which had been given such instructions was putting itself in significant danger. The Germans knew of these, even though they were intended to be secret, copies having been obtained from captured ships and from wireless intercepts. Bailey and Ryan in their book The Lusitania Disaster put much emphasis on these orders, pointing out that though the directives were "definitely designed to save shipping", attempting to ram or even merely to evade could be argued to make attacking the ship legitimate. In their opinion, this, rather than the munitions, the nonexistent armament, or any other suggested reason, is the best legal justification for the Germans' actions, though Berlin never made an "emphatic" point of it.

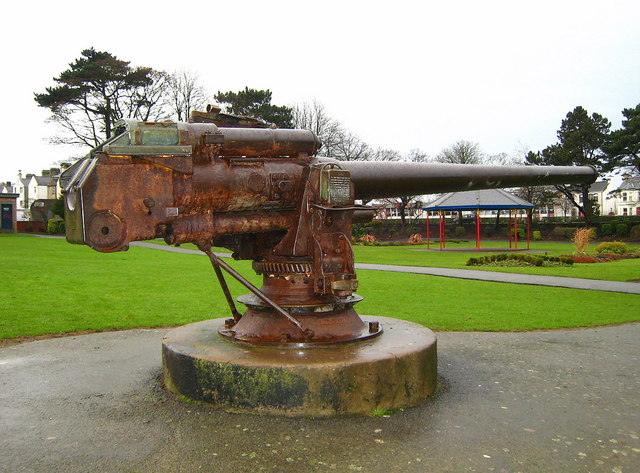
105mm deck gun taken from U-20's sister ship U-19. Usage of such guns accounted for the majority of early sinkings and were considered more acceptable legally.

German historian Gerhard Ritter states though that even by 1916, the majority of sinkings were still conducted with warning by U-boat deck guns, for they were far more effective than limited and inaccurate torpedoes. Lusitania was a much larger and faster ship, with a better chance of evading or ramming, though commercial vessels only successfully sunk a submarine through ramming once during the war (in 1918 the White Star Liner HMT Olympic, sister ship to Titanic and Britannic, rammed SM U-103 in the English Channel).

In his communications with Germany, President Wilson adhered strictly to cruiser rules, claiming that only 'actual resistance' by the ship would in his view make the attack legitimate, and that if a ship cannot be attacked safely and legally, then she should simply not be attacked. In argument with German political leaders during the Arabic crisis, Admiral Bachmann argued that they did not want Britain to adhere to the Declaration of London, as it was more important to be able to continue the submarine attacks and British actions helped justify that.

=== The second explosion ===
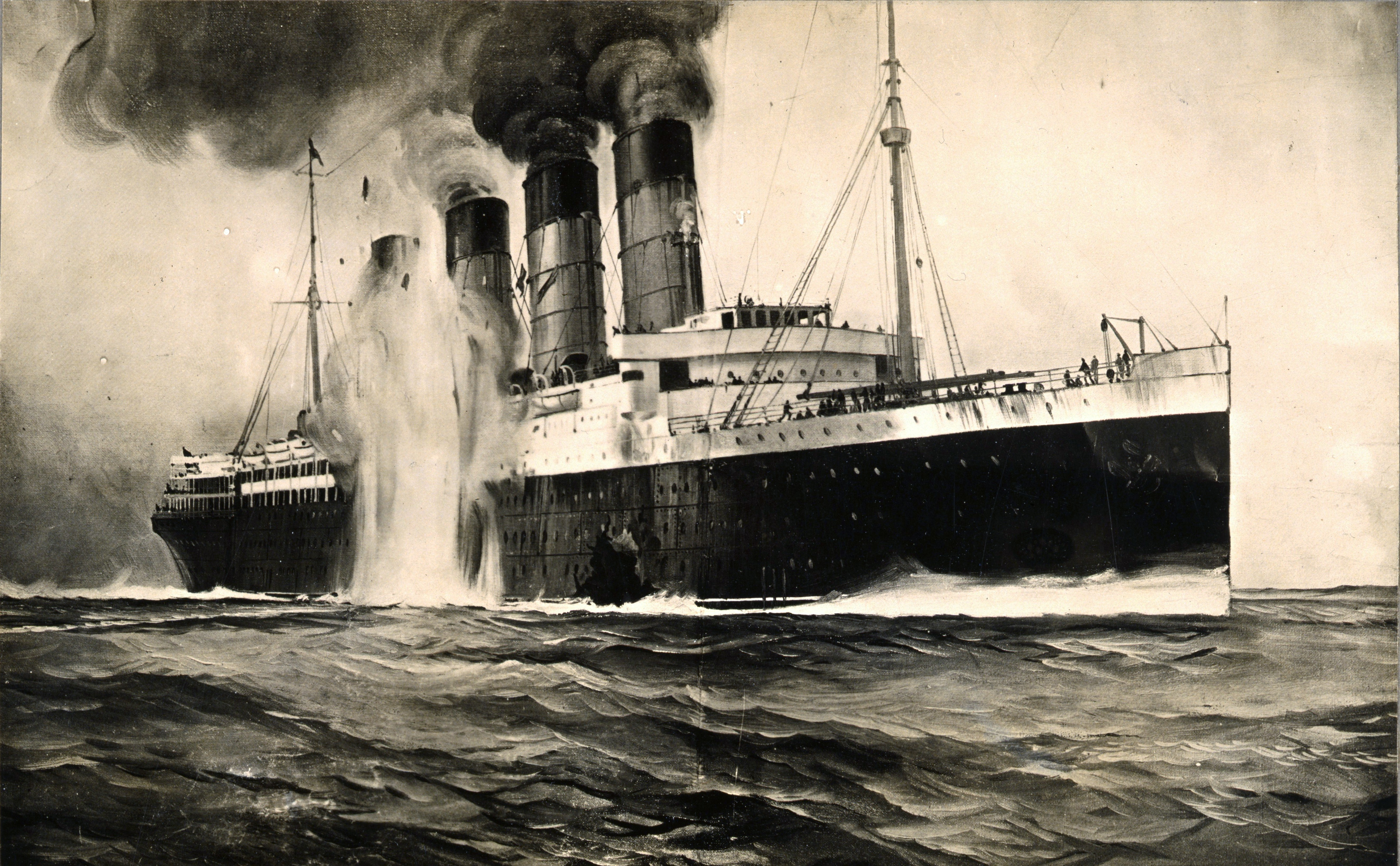
Contemporary British drawing of Lusitania being torpedoed, showing now-debunked "second torpedo"

Many survivors from Lusitania reported that a second explosion took place either immediately or a few seconds afterwards, some suggesting it felt more severe. This explosion has been used to explain the speed of Lusitania's sinking, and has been the subject of debate since the disaster, with the situation of the wreck (lying on top of the site of the torpedo hit) making obtaining definitive answers difficult. At the time, official inquiries attributed it to a second torpedo attack from the U-boat, as was recalled by multiple witnesses. However, testimony and radio communications from U-20 makes clear that only one torpedo was fired towards the Lusitania, Schwieger even commenting in his war diary that firing a second torpedo was impossible due to the crowd of frenzied passengers who dived into the ocean in panic. It is possible that a second torpedo, or even a second submarine was present and was covered up, though this is unlikely.

A debated theory assigns the blame for the second blast on Lusitania's cargo. This included tons of .303 rifle/machine-gun cartridges, shell casings and fuses, all of which were listed on the ship's two-page manifest, filed with US Customs after she departed. The small arms ammunition were known to be non-explosive in bulk, and were clearly marked as such. It was perfectly legal under American shipping regulations for the liner to carry these; experts agreed they were not to blame for the second explosion. The inquiry at the time of the sinking found that there were no other explosives on board, though there has been a long history (starting from German propagandists) of people claiming otherwise. Patrick O'Sullivan agrees that the shells were empty (to be filled with explosives on arrival) and the fuses non-explosive, using sworn testimony from the manufacturer in a later case and an analysis of the shells' listed weight. He asserts that a consignment of fine aluminium powder, possibly disturbed during the first explosion, may be responsible. In experiments though, the explosion of aluminum powder or guncotton (pyroxylene) (a suggested hidden explosive) did not appear to match the properties observed at the time. The presence of other secret explosives has never been proven. Eyewitness reports, including accounts by the U-boat captain and onlookers who saw a specific lifeboat destroyed, also tend to place the position of the initial torpedo strike far back from the cargo hold.

Side plan view of Lusitania. Locations relevant to sinking are highlighted, specifically cargo hold, bridge U-20 reported striking behind, No. 5 boat witnesses reported seeing destroyed, coal bunker, and the boiler rooms. The boiler rooms also have smaller coal bunkers running along the side of the ship.

In the 1960s, American diver John Light dived repeatedly to the site of the shipwreck in efforts to prove the existence of contraband explosives aboard Lusitania's cargo hold, which had been ignited by the torpedo. In 1993, Dr. Robert Ballard, the famous explorer who discovered Titanic and the German battleship Bismarck, conducted an in-depth exploration of the wreck of Lusitania. Ballard, believing initially that the explosion was due to contraband, tried to confirm John Light's findings of a large hole on the port side of the wreck. Instead he found no hole, and when he inspected the whole exposed area of the cargo hold he found it "clearly undamaged". He thus concluded no cargo explosion took place. During his investigation, Ballard noted a large quantity of coal on the sea bed near the wreck, and after consulting an explosives expert advanced the theory of a coal dust explosion. He believed dust in depleted coal bunkers would have been thrown into the air by the torpedo detonation; the resulting cloud would have been ignited by a spark, causing the second explosion. Critics of the theory say coal dust would have been too damp to have been stirred into the air by the torpedo impact in explosive concentrations, or that the coal bunker where the torpedo struck would have been flooded almost immediately by seawater flowing through the damaged hull plates.

In 2007, marine forensic investigators considered that an explosion in the ship's steam-generating plant could be a plausible explanation for the second explosion. Though accounts from the few survivors who managed to escape from the forward two boiler rooms reported that the ship's boilers did not explode, Leading Fireman Albert Martin later testified he thought the torpedo entered the boiler room and exploded between a group of boilers. Though this account was a physical impossibility, many others did place the torpedo strike in the general vicinity of the boiler rooms. It is also known the forward boiler room filled with steam, and steam pressure feeding the turbines dropped dramatically following the second explosion. These point toward a failure, of one sort or another, in the ship's steam-generating plant. It is possible the failure came, not directly from one of the boilers, but rather in the high-pressure steam lines to the turbines. Witnesses reported explosions many minutes after the attack from the flooded parts of the ship, which suggests at least some of the boilers did explode.

Another theory is that in fact only one explosion took place, with the "first explosion" merely the physical impact of the torpedo on the hull, though this faces the problem that torpedoes of the time were fused to explode immediately on impact. In any case, explanations like this and the steam lines theory propose that torpedo damage alone, striking near the boiler rooms, sunk Lusitania quickly without a second substantial explosion, and are strengthened by recent research that found that this blast would be enough to cause, on its own, serious off-centre flooding. The deficiencies of the ship's original watertight bulkhead design would then exacerbate the situation, as did the many portholes which had been left open for ventilation. In 1997, naval architects at JMS argued this point, noting that once the ship lost steam pressure, systems like automatic watertight doors would no longer function, allowing the ship in their simulations to sink as fast as it did without any additional damage. In 2012, explosives researchers at Lawrence Livermore Laboratory agreed, arguing that their experiments and evidence from the wreck showed that the torpedo itself caused the catastrophic sinking, with the second explosion having little impact. Historian J. Kent Layton reviewed 86 survivor accounts in 2016, and believed that these, together with the immediate 15 degree list of the ship, indicate that the torpedo struck in between boiler rooms 1 and 2. This was an especially vulnerable location, allowing immediate flooding from both boiler rooms' bunkers, and led to a secondary explosion from the boilers or steam apparatus within that likely did not cause much additional critical damage. The speed of the sinking was thus due to the poor ability of Lusitania to contain flooding.

=== British Government deliberately putting Lusitania at risk ===
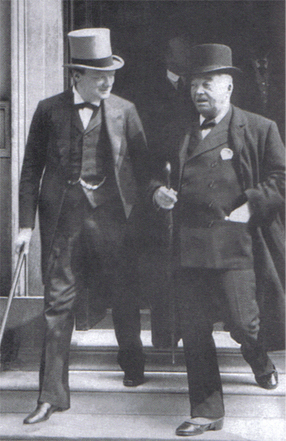
Churchill and Fisher. Churchill is commonly pointed to as the main culprit, with others in the Admiralty perhaps assisting in a cover up.

There has long been a theory, expressed by historian and former British naval intelligence officer Patrick Beesly and authors Colin Simpson and Donald E. Schmidt among others, that Lusitania was deliberately placed in danger by the British authorities, so as to entice a U-boat attack and thereby drag the US into the war on the side of Britain. Simpson and later authors point to a letter Winston Churchill wrote to Walter Runciman, the president of the Board of Trade, on 12 February shortly after the German announcement, focusing on a line where he states it's "most important to attract neutral shipping to our shores, in the hope especially of embroiling the United States with Germany."

Beesly concludes: "unless and until fresh information comes to light, I am reluctantly driven to the conclusion that there was a conspiracy deliberately to put Lusitania at risk in the hope that even an abortive attack on her would bring the United States into the war. Such a conspiracy could not have been put into effect without Winston Churchill's express permission and approval."

At the post-sinking inquiry, Captain Turner refused to answer certain questions on the grounds of war-time secrecy imperatives. The British government continues to keep secret certain documents relating to the final days of the voyage, including certain of the signals passed between the Admiralty and Lusitania. Some authors also claim that the records that are available are often missing critical pages, and assert a number of other disputed claims:

1. The British authorities were aware (thanks to the secret decryption activities of Room 40) that a German submarine was in the path of Lusitania, but decided not to divert the ship to a safer route.
2. The authorities deliberately and maliciously refused to provide a destroyer escort.
3. The ship was ordered to only run 3 of its 4 boilers (thus lowering its maximum speed) due to Cunard policy changes aimed at lowering coal costs during the war.
4. Such a big ship cannot be expected to sink quickly from a single torpedo strike.

Most historians conclude that such a conspiracy is unlikely. The flow of Room 40 intelligence to merchant shipping, even if it could have been useful, had always been hampered by the overriding goal of protecting the secrecy of the source. Nevertheless, the ship had been repeatedly warned about the general presence of submarines in the area, and informed about U-20's previous sinkings. Indeed, Turner claimed later in life that he felt overwhelmed by the number of warnings he got, imagining that there were perhaps six submarines waiting for him. Escorts were also limited in availability and Lusitania was faster and less vulnerable than those that were available. There would be very little guarantee of a successful attack even with perfect information, as the slow speed of a submerged submarine would require the ship to pass within a few hundred yards of the attacker and torpedo attacks were unreliable at this time anyway. Churchill was speaking to Runciman in the context of offering insurance to neutral merchant shipping that Germany hoped to deter from trading with Britain. His statements did not apply to a British liner – indeed, his "embroilment" was meant to create "safety" for Allied ships like Lusitania. Any secrecy could also be explained in terms of avoiding embarrassment at ineffectual and disorganised British anti-submarine warfare measures.

There was also little advantage to the US joining the war at this time, nor was American reaction certain – German submarine captains had, after all, been given deliberate orders to target passenger vessels believing this would produce a useful deterrent effect on shipping, and the anti-interventionalist Secretary of State Bryan reacted to the sinking by advising President Wilson to instead simply prohibit passenger ships from carrying ammunition. In 1923, Churchill discussed the letter, writing of his belief that offense to neutrals due to "inevitable accidents" would lead to a "sensible abatement" of pressure against the British blockade, which would appear less illegal in contrast.

In 1916, after the Germans were pressured into restricting their submarine campaign, relations between the US and Germany actually improved even as tonnage of ships sunk grew. Meanwhile, relations with the British became markedly worse, with some even suggesting that America join the war against the Allies.

=== War munitions ===
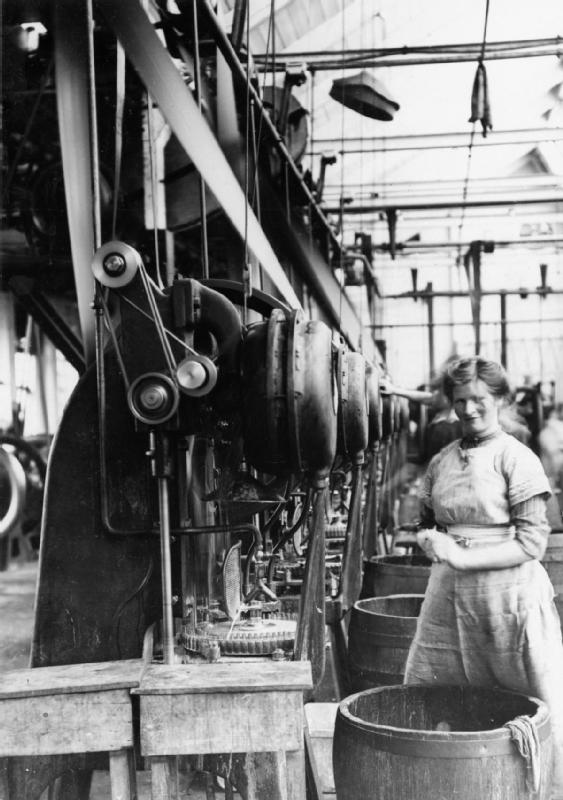
Workers producing .303 British ammunition of the type acknowledged to be on the ship. Britain domestically produced the vast majority of its WWI ammunition though imports to supplement supplies were being considered at this time.

Lusitania was officially carrying among her cargo 4,200 cases of rifle/machine-gun ammunition, 1,250 cases of empty shrapnel artillery shells, and the artillery fuzes for those shells stored separately. This came to a total of 173 tons. In September 2008, .303 cartridges were recovered from the wreck by a diver. Additional declared material could be used for military purposes. The cargo included 50 barrels and 94 cases of aluminium (making 46 tons), an unknown quantity of which was in the powdered form used to produce explosives at Woolwich Arsenal, as well as other metals, leather and rubber.

Overall, these supplies represented around a third to a half (depending on what is counted) of the declared financial value of the cargo aboard the ship, but a relatively small volume of cargo on the ship. The passenger ship was also not an efficient cargo carrier, as much smaller dedicated vessels could carry far more cargo. For example, SS Mont-Blanc, involved in the Halifax explosion, could carry almost 3,000 tons of materials despite being a tenth the size. It also may be noted that the British War Office considered the majority of US-manufactured ammunition in this period to be of poor quality and so "suitable for emergency use only", and in any case incapable of supplying consumption of over 5 million rounds per day. American ammunition contracts were cancelled in 1916.

Some authors speculate on the presence of undeclared explosive munitions. Author Steven L. Danver alleges that Lusitania was also secretly carrying a large quantity of nitrocellulose (gun cotton). Another theory suggests 90 tons of butter and lard (un-refrigerated due to a lack of space and allegedly destined to a "Royal Navy Weapons Testing Facility" in Shoeburyness) may have been something else. Additional speculation centered on a consignment of furs, sent from Dupont de Nemours, a company that also manufactured explosives, though such furs were reported to have washed ashore in Ireland. Other authors have suggested that the shells were in fact live, which would mean that around 5 tonnes of cordite was on board, a notion that contradicts the fact that the declared weight of the shells corresponds to ones empty of explosive fill. No evidence of additional secret explosives has so far been found.

Many authors have suggested some sort of cover-up from the British or American authorities regarding the presence of the munitions. Yet the presence of the materiel was well known at the time, being made public in newspapers, raised in the official British inquiry, and presented to President Wilson. When Senator Robert M. La Follette suggested in 1917 a conspiracy where Wilson was warned that the ship carried 6 million rounds of ammunition, the New York authorities responded by providing him with the correct number. It is true that due to wartime censorship, issues of war materials were not to be freely discussed in the British press, though Germany's communications with the US were printed in British newspapers. However, official denial of the presence of "munitions" or "special ammunition" at the time really related to a denial of the possibility that the ship was carrying cargo dangerous to the passengers (hence statements like "she had on board 4200 cases of cartridges [...] they certainly do not come under the classification of ammunition"), or a denial that the ship was an armed warship ("equipped with masked guns, supplied with trained gunners and special ammunition"). The position taken by the British and Americans was not that there was no war materiel, but rather that what was present aboard the ship did not remove the passengers' right to safety, which is inherently endangered when attacked the way the ship was.

Bailey and Ryan discuss this in detail, noting that it was common knowledge that "dozens of ships" left New York with similar or larger cargoes of small arms ammunition and other military supplies. Earlier that year, Turner captained another Cunard liner that transported 15 inch naval artillery, despite public protests from Germany. They conclude that sending secret, illegal explosives in a passenger ship is unlikely given the availability of other dedicated cargo ships. They and other authors also note the contradiction of some authors suggesting that the ship was carrying essential war cargo, and yet simultaneously arguing the British were conspiring to get her sunk. The presence or absence of munitions being carried by Lusitania, while raised by early German propaganda, would not have affected the Germans' intention to target her, or the arguments both in favour and against the legitimacy of her sinking. It was in fact initially concocted as a measure by German admiral von Tirpitz to "incite public opinion at home".

=== Other controversies ===
The wreck was depth-charged or attacked with Hedgehog mortars. A Dublin-based technical diver, Des Quigley, who dived on the wreck in the 1990s, reported that the wreck is "like Swiss cheese" and the seabed around her "is littered with unexploded hedgehog mines". Similar observations were made by other explorers, such as the 1993 Ballard expedition. Conspiracy theorists have suggested this was part of a plot to destroy evidence of British deception, such as the presence of undeclared explosives. Instead, historians suggest this was due to NATO anti-submarine warfare exercises in 1948, which used the wreck as a target at a time when its historical value was not considered important. Layton notes that the wreck was sold for a mere £1000, and that despite the bombardment, the state of the wreck was such that expeditions in 1993 and 2011 could verify the intact state of the cargo hold, including "neatly stacked" ammunition.

Another debated topic is the degree of blame that can be placed on Captain Turner. This was the centre of the wartime inquiries, which raised the issue of whether he had failed to follow all of Admiralty instructions. While he was exonerated at the time, some historians disagree as to whether this was appropriate. Turner was also accused of poor preparedness of the ship, including the poor quality of lifeboat drilling, and for allowing portholes to be open. While most would agree that running into the submarine was ultimately a matter of bad luck, with the more modern understanding that the ship may have sunk from torpedo damage alone, the degree to which Turner may have exacerbated the loss of life gains some significance.

It is also suggested that there may have been some cover-up on the German end. This centers around the typewritten and unsigned nature of Schwieger's logs for that day, which implies a lost version more in line with his style for other logs. One suggestion is that Schwieger's log was edited to "humanise" his account, the commander being otherwise not noted for expressing much sympathy for his victims. Preston describes a number of inconsistencies in Schwieger's account, suggesting the diary demonstrated "institutional afterthoughts", aimed to demonstrate German conscience and British incompetence. A few survivor accounts also noted that they saw the submarine surfacing as the ship was sinking, some offering the criticism that the sub did not offer aid. While this is an unrealistic demand, it has been suggested that this surfacing did genuinely happen.

== Wreck site ==
The ship's telegraph on the wreck of Lusitania

The wreck of Lusitania lies on her starboard side at an approximately 30-degree angle in 305 feet (93 metres) of sea water. She is severely collapsed onto her starboard side as a result of the force with which she slammed into the sea floor, and over decades, Lusitania has deteriorated significantly faster than Titanic because of the corrosion in the winter tides. The keel has an "unusual curvature", in a boomerang shape, which may be related to a lack of strength from the loss of her superstructure. The beam is reduced with the funnels missing, presumably due to deterioration. The bow is the most prominent portion of the wreck with the stern damaged from the removal of three of the four propellers by Oceaneering International in 1982 for display.

Some of the prominent features on Lusitania include her still-legible name, some bollards with the ropes still intact, pieces of the ruined promenade deck, some portholes, the prow and the remaining propeller. Recent expeditions to the wreck have revealed that Lusitania is in surprisingly poor condition compared to Titanic, as her hull has already started to collapse.

== See also ==
- List of ships sunk by submarines by death toll
- RMS Hesperian – British passenger liner sunk by U-20
- SS Arabic (1902) – British passenger liner sunk in 1915, sparking the Arabic crisis.
- SS Tubantia – Dutch passenger ship sunk by U-boat, the largest neutral ship sunk in the war
