= Audrey Lawson-Johnston =

British socialite; last living survivor of RMS Lusitania

The Honourable Audrey Lawson-Johnston
- Born: Audrey Warren Pearl; 5 February 1915; New York City, U.S.
- Died: 11 January 2011 (aged 95); Melchbourne, Bedfordshire, U.K.
- Known for: Last living survivor of the sinking of RMS Lusitania
- Spouse: Hugh Lawson-Johnston (m. 1946–2002)
- Children: 3

Audrey Warren Lawson-Johnston (née Pearl; 5 February 1915 – 11 January 2011) was an American-born British socialite and who was the last living survivor of the sinking of the RMS Lusitania on 7 May 1915. One of the youngest passengers aboard, Audrey's life was saved by her nursemaid, Alice Lines. Two of her sisters died in the disaster.

Later in life, Lawson-Johnston was active in charity work, including being involved in the Royal National Lifeboat Institution. She spoke of her experience of being a Lusitania survivor. At the time of her death, she was the last living survivor of the sinking.

== Early years ==
She was born in New York City on 15 February 1915, the fourth of seven children (the youngest three born after the disaster) born to Major Frederic "Frank" Warren Pearl (1869–1952) and Amy Lea (née Duncan; 1880–1964). She was only three months old when she boarded Lusitania in New York with her parents, three siblings, and two nurses – and due to her age, Pearl had no first hand recollection of the disaster. Her father had gotten a job at the American embassy in Britain and was moving his family there.

She and her brother Stuart (age 5) were saved by their British nursemaid Alice Maud Lines, then 18 years old, escaped in a lifeboat off the portside. Her parents also survived, but her sisters Amy (age 3) and Susan (age 14 months), as well as the second nursemaid, Greta, died.

Later testifying at the inquiry into the sinking, Lines stated that she "rushed for the baby and boy" and took them to the port side boat deck as quickly as possible though having a "hill to climb" to get to a lifeboat because of the list. With the help of two passengers, she managed to get into a lifeboat with some difficulty. The lifeboat was lowered easily but got away with some difficulty and was one of the few to be successfully launched.

== Later life ==
Pearl attended North Foreland Lodge in Kent before going to a finishing school in Paris. In 1928, after having seen Charles Lindbergh visit to Croydon Airport after his transatlantic flight attempt, she decided to keep a diary which she maintained for the rest of her life.

Pearl was presented in court to the King and Queen in 1933. During World War II, she served as an ambulance driver and helped the Red Cross. Like her mother, Lawson-Johnston was an active fundraiser for the Royal National Lifeboat Institution. In 2004, she gifted an D-class lifeboat, Amy Lea, to New Quay Lifeboat Station in 2004 in memory of her mother. After her death, a lifeboat of the same class, the Audrey LJ, was named in her honour. She was also active in the National Society for the Prevention of Cruelty to Children.

Reportedly, Lawson-Johnston did not much speak of the sinking but once did share her own view on the sinking: "I never blamed the sea because it wasn't the sea's fault. It was the Germans' fault and that was that." She said of her chance survival: "I was put on this earth for some reason, I was saved for some reason. I hope I'm living up to worth being saved."

== Personal life ==
Pearl married the Hon. Hugh de Beauchamp Lawson-Johnston, second son of George Lawson Johnston, 1st Baron Luke on 18 July 1946. They had three children, and lived in Melchbourne, Bedfordshire. Hugh was High Sheriff of Bedfordshire in 1961.

Lawson-Johnston remained in touch with Alice Lines (later Drury), the woman who saved her life, until Lines' death in 1997, aged 100.

She died on 11 January 2011, at age 95.

== See also ==
- Millvina Dean, last living survivor of the Titanic disaster.
- Grace Hanagan, last living survivor of the Empress of Ireland disaster
