= Millvina Dean =

British civil servant and Titanic survivor (1912–2009)

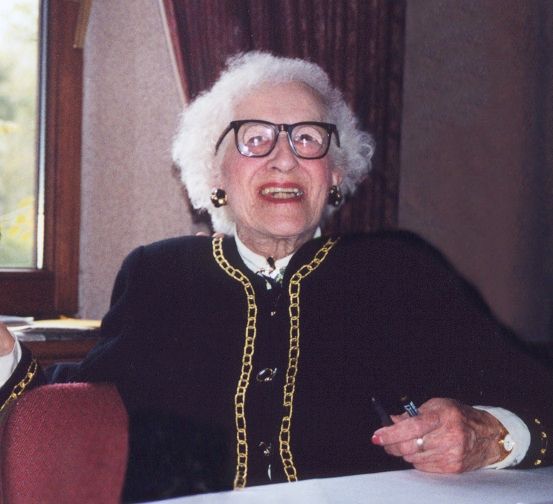
- Millvina Dean in 1999
- Born: Eliza Gladys Dean; 2 February 1912; Branscombe, Devon, England
- Died: 31 May 2009 (aged 97); Ashurst, Hampshire, England
- Occupations: Civil servant, cartographer
- Known for: Youngest passenger aboard and last remaining survivor of the RMS Titanic

Eliza Gladys Dean (2 February 1912 – 31 May 2009), known as Millvina Dean, was a British civil servant, cartographer, and the last living survivor of the sinking of the RMS Titanic on 15 April 1912 until her death in 2009. At two months old, she was also the youngest passenger aboard.

== Family ==
Dean was born at Culverwell House in Branscombe, on the south coast of Devon, England, on 2 February 1912, to Bertram Frank Dean (1886–1912) and Georgette Eva Light (1879–1975). She had an older brother, Bertram Vere Dean, born 21 May 1910. She never married and had no children. Her father died on the Titanic; her mother died on 16 September 1975, aged 96; and her brother died on 14 April 1992, aged 81, the 80th anniversary of the iceberg collision.

Millvina Dean's father, Bertram Dean, was born and grew up in Branscombe. He moved to London as an adult, where he married Millvina's mother, Ettie. The couple owned and ran a public house in London for several years.

== Aboard the Titanic ==
In 1912, the Deans decided to leave the United Kingdom and emigrate to the United States; they were planning to relocate to Wichita, Kansas, where Bertram had relatives, and he planned to become a stakeholder in a tobacconist's shop that his cousin owned. Bertram sold the pub and purchased a third class ticket for his family, costing £20 11s 6d, equivalent to £2,032.40 in 2025. Before leaving the United Kingdom, the Deans paid a visit to Branscombe to say goodbye to their family, and while there, Ettie Dean gave birth to Millvina.

The Deans were not originally supposed to be on board the Titanic, but due to a coal strike, they, along with many other passengers, were transferred onto the Titanic and boarded as third-class passengers at Southampton, England. Dean was nine weeks old when she boarded the ship. Her father felt its collision with the iceberg on the night of 14 April 1912 and, after investigating, returned to his cabin, telling his wife to dress the children and go up onto the deck. Dean, her mother, and her brother were placed in Lifeboat 10. Her father did not survive, and his body, if recovered, was never identified.

== Return to the United Kingdom ==
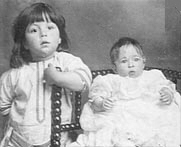
Millvina (right) and Bertram in 1912 or 1913

As was the case with many of Titanic's immigrant widows, Ettie Dean surrendered any notion of remaining in the United States once it was clear her husband had not been saved. In the 2000 PBS documentary Lost Liners, in giving her account of the disaster, Millvina described the state her mother was in during the aftermath of the disaster:

[W]e stayed in a hospital for two or three weeks for my mother to recover a little bit, and then we came back to England; because we had nothing, we had no clothes, we had no money and of course she was so broken-hearted, she just wanted to get home.

The White Star Line offered Ettie and her children passage back to England aboard RMS Adriatic. While aboard the ship, Dean attracted considerable attention. An article in the Daily Mirror dated 12 May 1912 described the ordeal:

[She] was the pet of the liner during the voyage, and so keen was the rivalry between women to nurse this lovable mite of humanity that one of the officers decreed that first and second class passengers might hold her in turn for no more than ten minutes.

Dean attended the Gregg School in Southampton. In her younger years she did not know that she had been on the Titanic, and only found out when she was eight when her mother became engaged.

Dean worked for the British government during World War II by drawing maps, and later served in the purchasing department of a Southampton engineering firm. She worked there as a secretary until her retirement in 1972.

== Later years ==
It was not until Dean was in her seventies that she became involved in Titanic-related events. Over the years, she participated in numerous conventions, exhibitions, documentaries, radio and television interviews, and personal correspondence. In September 1996, Millvina flew to New York City to attend a conference of RMS Titanic, Inc. and the Titanic International Society. One of the highlights while attending the conference, officers of both organizations hosted Millvina and her escort at the Windows on the World restaurant, located on the 107th floor of the World Trade Center's North Tower. In 1997, Dean sailed to New York, along with several members of the Titanic Historical Society, aboard the Queen Elizabeth 2 (QE2). After a few days in New York, she travelled to Kansas City, and visited the house that her uncle owned, where her family was going to settle. Several of her uncle's descendants met her for the first time. In 1998, she travelled to the United States to participate in a Titanic convention in Springfield, Massachusetts, and another in 1999 in Montreal, Quebec. She had also been scheduled to appear at a commemoration of the 94th anniversary of the sinking in 2006, but a broken hip prevented her appearance. She also appeared in the History special Titanic's Final Moments: Missing Pieces. Her brother Bertram, who had been a carpenter, also became active in Titanic-related commemorations until his death at the age of 81. Coincidentally, Bertram died on 14 April 1992, the 80th anniversary of the sinking.

Dean staunchly refused to see James Cameron's film Titanic (1997). She recalled having nightmares after seeing A Night to Remember (1958), the film based on Walter Lord's book with the same title, and did not wish to imagine her father as one of the people in the crowd of passengers stranded on the sinking liner. She declined invitations to the premieres of Titanic and Ghosts of the Abyss (2003). In December 2007, she criticised the BBC and its television programme Doctor Who for including an episode with a starship "cruise liner" called the Titanic which was similar in appearance to the historical liner. Speaking from her nursing home, she said: "The Titanic was a tragedy which tore so many families apart. I lost my father and he lies on that wreck. I think it is disrespectful to make entertainment of such a tragedy." A spokeswoman for the show said: "No offence was intended. 'Voyage of the Damned' is set on a spaceship called The Titanic and not a boat."

== Health issues ==
In April 2008, Dean had accepted an invitation to speak in Southampton at an event commemorating the 96th anniversary of the sinking, but ill health resulting from a respiratory infection forced her to cancel.

In December 2008, at age 96, Dean was forced to sell several of her family's possessions to pay for her private medical care following a broken hip. These included a letter sent to her mother from the Titanic Relief Fund, and a suitcase given to her and her mother in New York following the sinking. Their sale raised approximately £32,000. In February 2009, she announced that she would be selling several more items to pay for her increasing nursing home costs which she said exceeded £3,000 a month.

== The Millvina Fund ==
In response to the escalating cost of Dean's care, The Millvina Fund was set up in April 2009 by the Belfast, British, and International Titanic Societies with the exclusive aim of taking care of her nursing home bills. It was given a boost by the Irish author and campaigning journalist Don Mullan at the opening of his worldwide Nokia photographic exhibition, A Thousand Reasons for Living (featuring a portrait of Dean), in Dublin on 22 April 2009. Mullan introduced an additional portrait of Dean's hands, as she signed a card for a Titanic autograph collector, which he produced as a limited edition of 100 copies. He made the edition available at €500 each and then challenged the director and stars of the film Titanic (1997) – James Cameron, Leonardo DiCaprio, and Kate Winslet – singer Celine Dion, and the corporations Sony Music, 20th Century Fox, and Paramount Pictures to match him euro-for-euro to support her with her bills. DiCaprio and Winslet led the way with a joint contribution of US$20,000. Cameron and Dion donated US$10,000 each.

== Death ==
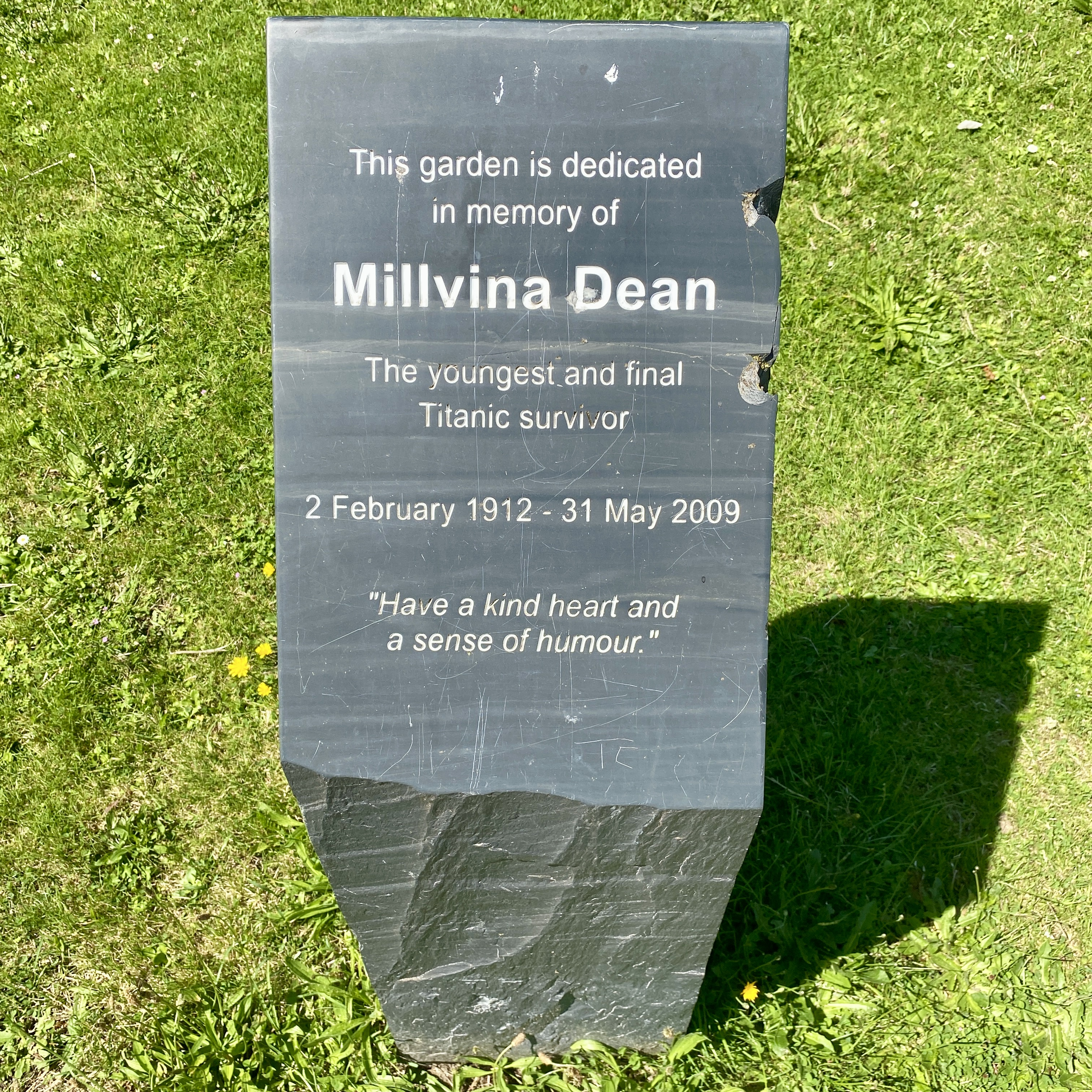
Memorial stone to Millvina Dean, Southampton

After the death of Barbara West Dainton in October 2007, Dean became the last living Titanic survivor. Dean died of pneumonia on the morning of 31 May 2009, aged 97 at a care home in Ashurst, Hampshire; her death coincided with the 98th anniversary of the Titanic's launch on 31 May 1911.

She was cremated, and on 24 October 2009, her ashes were scattered from a launch at the docks in Southampton where the Titanic set sail.

== See also ==
- Grace Hanagan, last survivor of the Empress of Ireland disaster
- Audrey Lawson-Johnston, last survivor of the Lusitania sinking
- Adella Wotherspoon, last survivor of the General Slocum disaster
