= Van Dammes =

Finnish band

Van Dammes are a Finnish four-piece garage punk band from Helsinki, originally formed in Brussels in 2013.

Their debut recording, The VD EP, garnered attention from various music blogs in 2014, and was named Record of the Week on Radio Helsinki's New Music Show. As their fast and concise style gained recognition, the second EP, Better Than Sex, gained attention from major Finnish music magazines Rumba and Soundi in 2015. The EP was recorded in the same venue where Ramones performed in the 1970s and features tributes to a Yugoslav flight attendant Vesna Vulović and Frank Tower, a man reputed to have survived the sinking of three ocean liners. Van Dammes also released a tribute song to Japanese ski jumping legend Noriaki Kasai. In 2017, with their third EP, Vild Days, Van Dammes dug deep into the oldest roots of punk.

Van Dammes have actively toured Europe, and are currently recording for German Rockstar Records.

== Discography ==
=== Extended plays ===
- The VD EP (2014)
- Better Than Sex (2015)
- Vild Days (2017)
- Risky Business (2019)
- Finally There (2021)

=== Singles ===
- Vesna (Flash in the Night) (2015)
- Thunderbirds Are Go (2016)

=== Compilations ===
- The Best of (2017)

=== Music videos ===
- Daniel (2014)
- (Let's) Go (2014)
- Olé, Olé, Olé (2014)
- Lisbon, I Promise You (2014)
- Mr Noriaki Kasai (2014)
- Vesna (Flash in the Night) (2015)
- Frank Tower (2016)
- Thunderbirds Are Go (2016)
- Punk Rock Drummer (2017)
- Every Fourth Year (2017)
- Risky Business (2019)
- Tax Free World (2020)
- Finally There (2021)
