= British Wreck Commissioner's inquiry into the sinking of RMS Lusitania =

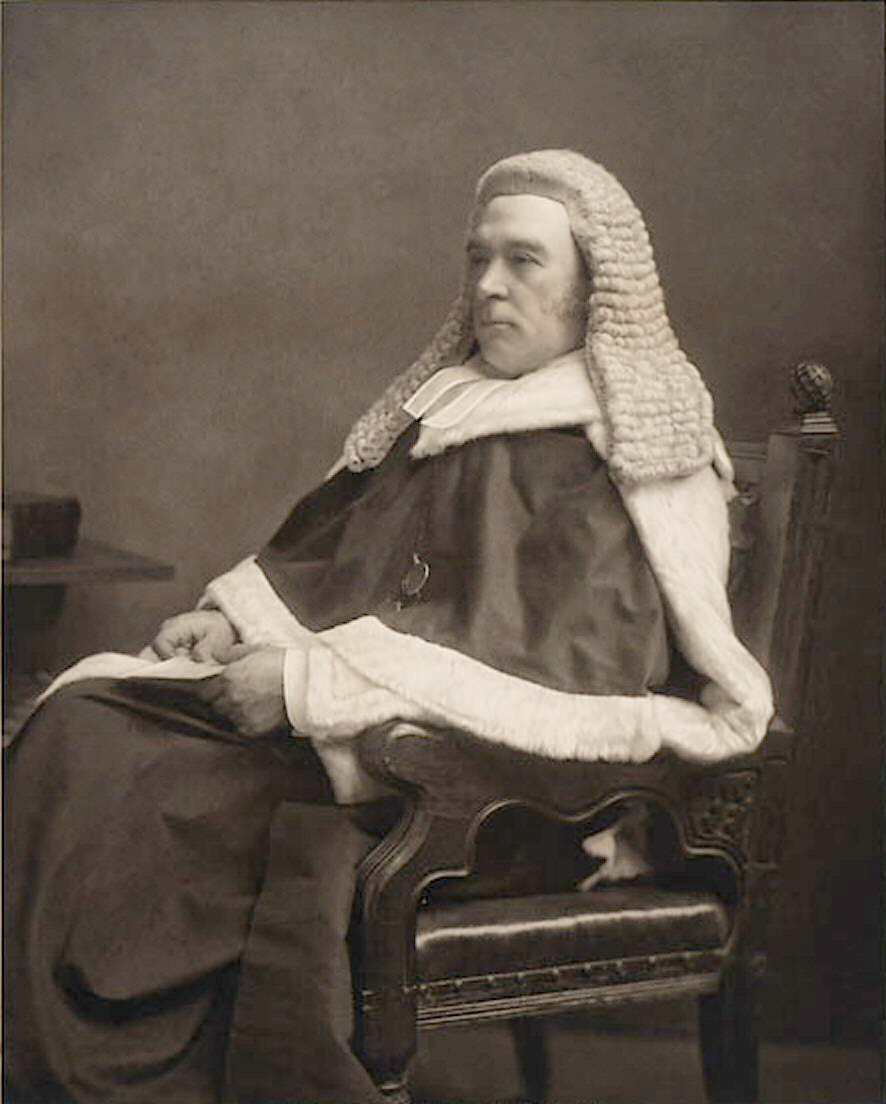
Lord Mersey, wreck commissioner presiding over the inquiry.

Following the sinking of RMS Lusitania after it was torpedoed by German submarine U-20, a formal Board of Trade investigation into the sinking was formed and presided over by Wreck Commissioner John Bigham, 1st Viscount Mersey. The hearings took place in the Westminster Central Hall from 15 to 18 June 1915 with further sessions at the Westminster Palace Hotel on 1 July and Caxton Hall on 17 July. Though he had a background in commercial law, Lord Mersey had presided over a number of high-profile maritime investigations, including those into the losses of the RMS Titanic and the RMS Empress of Ireland.

Mersey was assisted by four assessors: Admiral Sir Frederick Inglefield, Lieutenant Commander Hearn and two merchant navy captains, D. Davies and J. Spedding. The Attorney General, Sir Edward Carson, represented the Board of Trade, assisted by the Solicitor General, F. E. Smith. Butler Aspinall, who had represented the Board of Trade at the Titanic inquiry, was retained to represent Cunard. A total of 36 witnesses were called, Lord Mersey querying why more of the survivors would not be giving evidence. Most of the sessions were public but two on 15 and 18 June were held in camera when evidence regarding navigation of the ship was presented.

== Background ==
On 7 May 1915, during World War I, the RMS Lusitania was torpedoed by an Imperial German Navy U-boat U-20 about 11 nautical miles (20 kilometres; 13 miles) off the Old Head of Kinsale, Ireland (then part of the United Kingdom). The attack took place in the declared maritime war-zone around the United Kingdom, three months after unrestricted submarine warfare against the ships of the United Kingdom had been announced by Germany following the Allied powers' implementation of a naval blockade against it and the other Central Powers. There were only 763 survivors (39%) out of the 1,960 passengers, crew and stowaways aboard.

== Testimony ==
After survivors arrived in Queenstown, Ireland, statements were collected from all the crew. These were all written out for presentation to the inquiry on standard forms in identical handwriting with similar phrasing. Quartermaster Johnston later described that pressure had been placed upon him to be loyal to the company, and that it had been suggested to him it would help the case if two torpedoes had struck the ship, rather than the one which he described. Giving evidence to the tribunal he was not asked about torpedoes. Other witnesses who claimed that only one torpedo had been involved were refused permission to testify. In contrast to his statement at the inquest, Captain Turner stated that two torpedoes had struck the ship, not one. In an interview in 1933, Turner reverted to his original statement that there had been only one torpedo. Most witnesses said there had been two, but a couple said three, possibly involving a second submarine. Clement Edwards, representing the seamen's union, attempted to introduce evidence about which watertight compartments had been involved but was prevented from doing so by Lord Mersey.

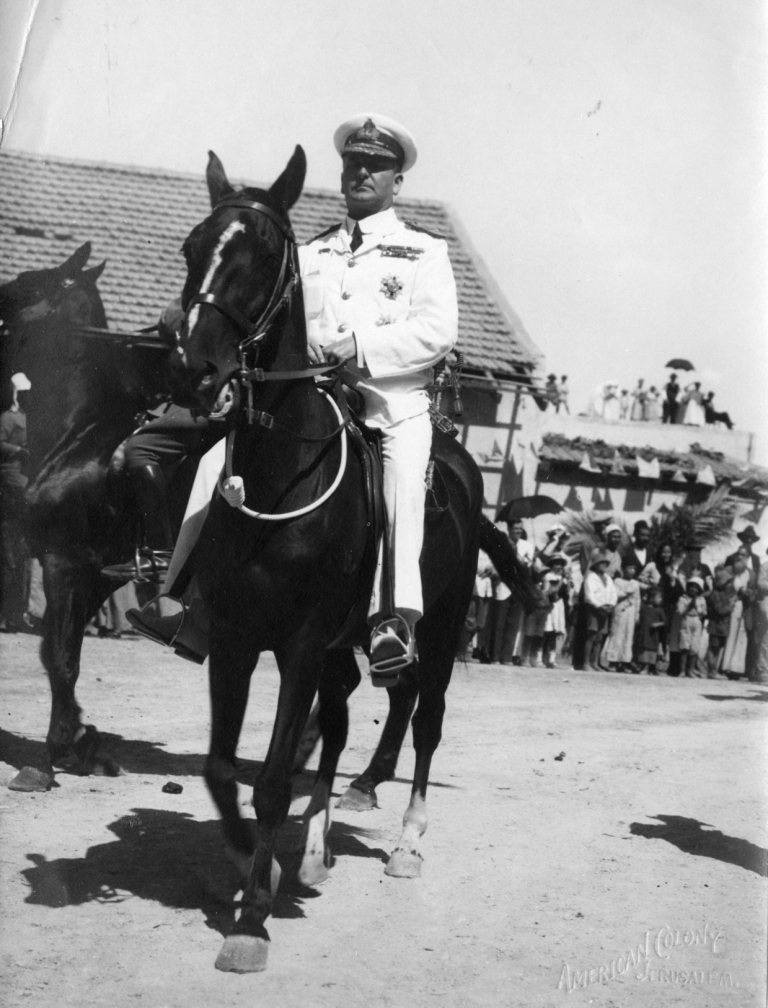
Richard Webb, director of the Trade Division at the time.

It was during the closed hearings that the Admiralty tried to lay the blame on Captain William Thomas Turner, their intended line being that Turner had been negligent. The roots of this view began in the first reports about the sinking from Vice-Admiral Coke commanding the Navy at Queenstown. He reported that "ship was especially warned that submarines were active on south coast and to keep mid-channel course avoiding headlands also position of submarine off Cape Clear at 10:00 was communicated by W/T to her". Captain Richard Webb, Director of the Trade Division, began to prepare a dossier of signals sent to Lusitania which Turner may have failed to observe. First Sea Lord Fisher noted on one document submitted by Webb for review: "As the Cunard company would not have employed an incompetent man its a certainty that Captain Turner is not a fool but a knave. I hope that Turner will be arrested immediately after the enquiry whatever the verdict". First Lord Winston Churchill noted: "I consider the Admiralty's case against Turner should be pressed by a skilful counsel and that Captain Webb should attend as a witness, if not employed as an assessor. We will pursue the captain without check". In the event, both Churchill and Fisher were replaced in their positions before the enquiry because of the failures of the Gallipoli campaign.

Part of the proceedings turned on the question of proper evasive tactics against submarines. It was put to Captain Turner that he had failed to comply with Admiralty instructions to travel at high speed, maintain a zig-zag course and keep away from shore. Lusitania had slowed to 15 knots at one point because of fog, but had otherwise maintained 18 knots passing Ireland. 18 knots was faster than all but nine other ships in the British merchant fleet could achieve and was comfortably faster than the submarine. At the time, no ship had been torpedoed travelling at more than 15 knots. Although he might have achieved 21 knots and had given orders to raise steam ready to do so, he was also under orders to time his arrival at Liverpool for high tide so that the ship would not have to wait to enter port. Thus, he chose to travel more slowly.

However, Turner could have also accomplished his desired arrival time at high speed by zig-zagging, albeit at a higher cost in fuel. Naval instructions about zig-zagging were read to the captain, who confirmed that he had received them, though later added that they did not appear to be as he recollected. This was unsurprising, since the general regulations quoted had been approved only on 25 April, after Lusitania's last arrival in New York, and started distribution on 13 May, after she sank, though Turner's response indicated that he had received some earlier specific instructions on 16 April. Turner expressed that his interpretation of the advice he did receive was to zig-zag once submarines were sighted, which would be useless in the case of a surprise submerged attack.

Although the Admiralty instructed ships to keep well offshore, it was also not clear how far this meant. The Admiralty claimed that Turner had only been 8 nautical miles (15 km) away, while his actual distance when hit was thirteen nautical miles (24 km). Both were still substantially more distant than the 2 nautical miles (3.7 km) distant course ships would have taken during peacetime, which ironically also would have caused Lusitania to miss the submarine. However, Turner had been intent on bringing the ship far closer. Turner stated that he had discussed the matter of what course the ship should take with his two most senior officers, Captain Anderson and Chief Officer Piper, neither of whom survived. The three had agreed that the Admiralty warning of "submarine activity 20 miles [37 km] south of Coningbeg" effectively overrode other Admiralty advice to keep to 'mid channel', which was where he believed the submarines to be. He had, therefore, approached the Head of Kinsale to obtain a bearing, intending to bring the ship closer to land and then take a course north of the reported submarine a mere half mile away from shore. It was while steering a straight course to obtain this bearing that the attack came.

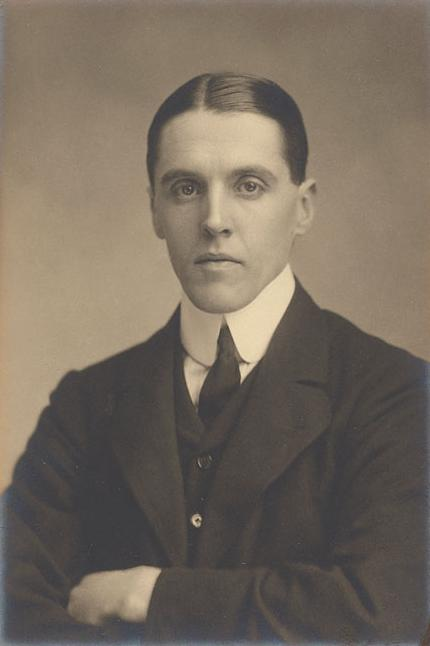
F. E. Smith, solicitor general.

At one point in the proceedings, Smith attempted to press a point he was making, by quoting from a signal sent to British ships. Lord Mersey queried which message this was, and it transpired that the message in question existed in the version of evidence given to Smith by the Board of Trade Solicitor, Sir Ellis Cunliffe, but not in versions given to others. Cunliffe explained the discrepancy by saying that different versions of the papers had been prepared for use, depending whether the enquiry had been in camera or not, but the message quoted appeared never to have existed. Lord Mersey observed that it was his job to get at the truth, and thereafter became more critical of Admiralty evidence.

An additional hearing took place on 1 July, at the insistence of Joseph Marichal, who was threatening to sue Cunard for their poor handling of the disaster. He testified that the second explosion had sounded to him like the rattling of machine gun fire and appeared to be below the second class dining room at the rear of the ship where he had been seated. Information about Marichal's background was sought out by the British government and then distorted and leaked to the press so as to discredit him. The rifle cartridges Marichal alluded to were mentioned during the case, with Lord Mersey stating that "the 5,000 cases of ammunition on board were 50 yards away from where the torpedo struck the ship, there were no other explosives on board". All had agreed they could not have caused the second explosion.

In the end, Captain Turner, the Cunard Company, and the Royal Navy were absolved of any negligence, and all blame was placed on the German government. Lord Mersey found that Turner did deviate from Admiralty instructions which may have saved the ship, but such instructions were suggestions more than orders. Thus, the captain had "exercised his judgment for the best" and that the blame for the disaster "must rest solely with those who plotted and with those who committed the crime".

== Reactions and legacy ==
According to Colin Simpson, Lord Mersey later told his children: "The Lusitania case was a damned, dirty business!" While a public report was presented to Parliament and reported on by the British press, Simpson suggests the existence of a fuller, secret report, which might exist amongst Lord Mersey's private papers after his death, but has since proved untraceable. Bailey and Ryan are of the opinion that Mersey decided to "whitewash" Turner, having indicated suspicion of mismanagement from Turner and Cunard in his questioning. Admiral Inglefield had suggested he blame Turner for disobeying Admiralty orders, but Mersey had responded that this may help strengthen Germany's case. When the verdict came, it was met with anger and surprise from Lusitania survivors.
