= Lillian Asplund =

Titanic survivor (1906–2006)

- Born: October 21, 1906; Worcester, Massachusetts, U.S.
- Died: May 6, 2006 (aged 99); Shrewsbury, Massachusetts, U.S.
- Known for: One of the last three survivors of sinking of the Titanic
- Parent(s): Carl Asplund; Selma Asplund
- Family: Filip Asplund; Clarence Asplund; Carl Asplund (her twin); Felix Asplund

Lillian Gertrud Asplund (October 21, 1906 – May 6, 2006) was an American secretarial worker who was one of the last three living survivors of the sinking of the Titanic on April 15, 1912. Asplund was the last living survivor with memories of the disaster, as well as the last surviving American that was aboard the ill-fated ship.

== Early life ==
Lillian Asplund was born on October 21, 1906, in Worcester, Massachusetts, United States, to Carl and Selma (née Johansson) Asplund, both immigrants from Sweden. Her parents had lived briefly in Missouri prior to settling in Worcester. Lillian had a twin brother, Carl, two older brothers, Filip (born 1898), Clarence (born 1902) and younger brother Felix (born 1909), who was the only other survivor besides her mother and herself.

In 1907, Lillian's family received word that Lillian's paternal grandfather had died back in Sweden. As her father was the executor of his estate, the family made arrangements to return to Sweden to settle the estate of the family farm, located near the village of Alseda in Småland. Lillian, her parents and three brothers sailed from Boston aboard the Cunard Line's Ivernia and arrived in Liverpool on July 4, from where they proceeded to Gothenburg before arriving at Alseda. The family remained at Alseda for over four years while settling matters with the farm and caring for Lillian's grandmother, during which time Selma gave birth to another son, Felix, in March 1909. Lillian's mother would have rather stayed in Sweden, but her father said the children would get a better education back in America and booked passage for his family on the new White Star Line's Titanic.

== Aboard Titanic ==
Lillian, her parents, and four brothers boarded Titanic at Southampton, England, United Kingdom, on April 10, 1912, as third-class passengers. Lillian was five years old at the time and recalled that the ship "was very big, and it had just been painted. I remember not liking the smell of fresh paint."

Selma Asplund recalled that when Titanic struck an iceberg at 11:40 pm on the night of April 14, 1912, the family got to the first class promenade window where Lillian and Felix were loaded into descending lifeboat no. 10 by their father. Despite her mother's wishes to remain with her husband, she eventually was thrown in the boat; Lillian later recalled,

"My mother said she would rather stay with him [my father] and go down with the ship. But he said the children should not be alone. She [my mother] got a seat. She had Felix on her lap, and she had me between her knees. I think she thought she could keep me a little warmer that way."

Because the boat was nearly full and there was no more room for the other boys, Carl Asplund told his wife, "Go ahead, we will get into one of the other boats." Lillian was haunted by the memory of seeing her father and brothers standing at the rail and seeing her father lead her brothers away, presumably to find another lifeboat. She later said that the ship sinking "looked like a big building going down."

Lillian's father, Carl, and her three brothers, Filip, Clarence and Carl Edgar, all died in the sinking. Lillian, her mother and brother were rescued by RMS Carpathia, which had arrived at the scene shortly after four o'clock in the morning. Lillian and her brother were loaded into burlap bags and hoisted to the ship's deck. Aboard the Carpathia, Lillian remembered:

A woman took all my clothes off me. My clothes had gotten very dirty and wet in the lifeboat. My mother was trying to find me. She was saying, 'I have a daughter!' Well, she found me. And eventually my clothes were dry, and I put them back on. They took us, the children, to the place where they take people who are sick. Well, not sick, but people who needed a little more attention. The people on the Carpathia were very good to us."

Carpathia arrived in New York City on April 18. Lillian's mother took her and her brother to Worcester shortly thereafter.

In the confusion after the disaster, a Worcester newspaper reported that both Mr. and Mrs. Asplund had been saved, along with Clarence, Lillian and Felix, and that Filip and Carl had drowned. A later report said that Mrs. Asplund and her "two babies" had been taken to a local hospital, and that Mr. Asplund and Clarence were apparently at another location. A final report confirmed that neither Lillian's father nor Clarence were among the survivors. Mr. Asplund's body was recovered by CS Mackay-Bennett. On his corpse was his watch, its hands frozen at 2:19 am, one minute before the ship went down entirely. He was later buried in All Faiths Cemetery in Worcester. As the family's savings and possessions were lost in the disaster, a fundraiser and benefit was held by the city of Worcester which brought in $2,000 (equivalent to $66,700 in 2025).

== Later life ==
Lillian's mother never recovered from the loss of her husband and three eldest sons and refused to discuss the disaster with anyone, saying that it was simply wrong to do so. Lillian agreed and, for the rest of her life, hardly ever spoke of the disaster. According to her lawyer, when asked about why she refused interviews even when offered money, Lillian stated: "Why do I want money from the Titanic? Look what I lost. A father and three brothers."

Lillian worked secretarial jobs in the Worcester area and retired early to care for her mother. Mrs. Asplund died on April 15, 1964, the 52nd anniversary of the sinking, at the age of 90. Her brother Felix, who never married and with whom Lillian lived, died of pneumonia on March 15, 1983, at the age of 73.

== Death ==
Asplund remained bedridden and reliant on a caregiver during most of the last four years of her life; she died in her home in Shrewsbury, Massachusetts, on May 6, 2006, at the age of 99. She was buried at the All Faiths Cemetery in Worcester, alongside her father, mother, and brother. Her death left Barbara West and Millvina Dean as the last two living survivors of the Titanic. However, as both women were less than a year old at the time, neither had any recollection of the sinking. With Lillian being the last survivor who remembered the disaster, first-hand accounts of the Titanic passed into history upon her death. She was also the last surviving American who travelled on the Titanic.

Asplund's death garnered media attention from all around the world. Nordgren Memorial Chapel in Worcester, where Asplund's wake and funeral services were held, received telephone calls and emails from as far away as Argentina and New Zealand. Due to the intense public attention surrounding Asplund's passing, her funeral was closed to the media.

After Asplund's death, the steamship ticket she had held for so many years was sold at auction in 2009. It was a part of documents and items that were posthumously found in a safety deposit box that were connected to the disaster, such as her father's pocket watch that stopped at 2:19 am.

Honorary titles
Preceded by Winnifred van Tongerloo	Oldest living survivor of the RMS Titanic; July 4, 2002 – May 6, 2006	Succeeded by Barbara Dainton
