= Barbara West =

RMS Titanic survivor (1911–2007)

- Born: Barbara Joyce West; 24 May 1911; Bournemouth, Hampshire, England
- Died: 16 October 2007 (aged 96); Truro, Cornwall, England
- Known for: Survivor of the Titanic sinking
- Spouses: Stanley Winder (m. 1938; died 1951) William Dainton (m. 1952; died 1990)
- Parent(s): Edwy West and Ada Worth
- Relatives: Constance and Edwyna West (sisters)

Barbara Joyce Dainton (née West, 24 May 1911 – 16 October 2007) was the penultimate remaining survivor of the sinking of the Titanic on 14 April 1912 after hitting an iceberg on its maiden voyage. She was the last living survivor who travelled second-class on the ship.

== Early life ==
Barbara Joyce West was born in Bournemouth, Hampshire (now Dorset), England, on 24 May 1911 to Edwy Arthur West and Ada Mary Worth. Ada had given birth to a daughter, Constance, in 1907, and was pregnant with a third child when she boarded the Titanic.

Edwy decided to start a new life in the fruit culture business in Gainesville, Florida, and, along with his expectant wife and two children, was emigrating there by way of the Titanic.

== Aboard Titanic ==
Barbara, her parents, and older sister, Constance, boarded the Titanic on 10 April 1912 at Southampton, England, as second-class passengers. Barbara was just ten months and eighteen days old, making her the eighth-youngest passenger on board the ship.

When the Titanic collided with an iceberg at 11:40 p.m, on 14 April 1912, Barbara was asleep in her cabin. Her mother, Ada, later recalled:

We were all asleep when the collision took place, but were only jolted in our berths-my husband and children not even being awakened, and it was only the hurrying of passengers outside the cabin that caused alarm. The steward made us all get up and dress thoroughly with plenty of warm things. Arthur placed lifebelts upon the children and then carried them to the boat deck. I followed carrying my handbag. After seeing us safely into the lifeboat, Arthur returned to the cabin for a thermos of hot milk, and, finding the lifeboat let down, he reached it by means of a rope, gave the flask to me, and, with a farewell, returned to the deck of the ship.

Barbara, her mother and sister all survived the sinking and were picked up by the rescue ship Carpathia. Her father, however, did not survive the sinking; and his body, if recovered, was never identified.

The surviving West family arrived in New York City aboard the Carpathia on 18 April. Upon their arrival, Ada booked passage for herself and her daughters aboard the White Star Line's RMS Celtic. The ship arrived at Liverpool, England, on 6 May, and Ada gave birth to a third daughter, Edwyna Joan (in honour of her father), on 14 September.

Her mother, Ada, died on 20 April 1953, aged 74, while her elder sister, Constance, died on 12 September 1963, aged 56. Barbara's sister, Edwyna, married a British diplomat and resided in England and the Bahamas.

== Schooling and career ==
As a child, Barbara attended the Worshipful Boarding School in Purley, England, and went on to attend the Truro High School all-girls school and St. Luke's College in Exeter. After college, Barbara became a governess to a Cornish family and moved with them to Spain until the outbreak of the Spanish Civil War in 1936. After returning to England, Barbara taught at a high school in Guildford.

In the 1950s, Barbara taught at a school in Truro, and she later became deputy head of physical education at Plymstock School until 1972.

== Marriages ==
In 1938, Barbara married Stanley Winder, a rugby player. The two were married for 13 years before Stanley died of a heart attack in 1951. Barbara was married to her second husband, William Ernest Barrel Dainton, from 1952 until his death in 1990. She had no children by either marriage.

== Later life ==
Throughout her life, Barbara avoided all publicity associated with the Titanic. As she aged and became one of only a handful of living survivors, more interest in Barbara's story grew, but she refused to discuss the disaster outside her family circle, often saying she wanted 'nothing to do with the Titanic people'. She did, however, communicate sparingly with the British Titanic Society, but such communication was heavily guarded.

Her later years saw her living in Truro, where she volunteered as a guide at the Truro Cathedral which contains a memorial tablet to her father.

== Death ==
Barbara died on 16 October 2007 in Truro, Cornwall, at the age of 96. Her funeral was held on 5 November at Truro Cathedral. To avoid unwanted attention and maintain privacy, Barbara insisted that her funeral take place before any public announcement of her death. With her death, 95-year-old Millvina Dean of Southampton, England, became the last living Titanic survivor; Dean died 19 months later.

Honorary titles
Preceded by Lillian Asplund	Oldest living survivor of the RMS Titanic; 6 May 2006 – 16 October 2007	Succeeded by Millvina Dean as Sole Survivor
