= Jane Quick =

British-American Titanic survivor (1878–1965)

- Born: Jane Richards; 31 August 1878; Plymouth, Devon, England
- Died: 24 February 1965 (aged 86); Grosse Pointe, Michigan, US
- Children: Winnifred Quick van Tongerloo and Phyllis Quick Murphy (daughters)

Jane Quick (née Richards, 31 August 1878 − 24 February 1965) was a British-American woman who was a survivor of the sinking of the RMS Titanic on 15 April 1912.

== Biography ==
=== Early life ===
Jane Richards was born in Plymouth, England on 31 August 1878 to Thomas and Mary Ann Richards. She had two half-sisters from her mother's first marriage, Bessie and Martha. Jane married plasterer Frederick Charles Quick in 1902, and they had two daughters, Winnifred in 1904 and Phyllis in 1909. In 1910, the Quicks emigrated to Detroit, Michigan in the US. Jane and her two daughters returned to England in 1912 to visit relatives and were ready to return in April 1912.

=== Aboard Titanic ===
Jane, eight-year-old Winnifred and two-year-old Phyllis boarded the RMS Titanic on 10 April 1912 in Southampton, England as second-class passengers. The smell of fresh paint in their cabin was so strong that Jane left the door ajar.

On the night of the collision, a steward knocked on the Quicks' cabin door and told them there was an accident but it was not serious. She took her time waking her daughters but eventually a steward came into the room and shouted, "For God's sake, get up! Don't stop to dress. Just put on your life jackets. They've hit an iceberg, and the ship is sinking!" The trio made their way up to the boat deck where Winnifred began to cry hysterically as she was under the impression that she would have to jump into the ocean. Both girls were loaded into lifeboat no. 11; Jane was initially denied entry but eventually protested her way in, as she stated she would not be separated from her children. Once the lifeboat was in the water, the oars continued to hit Jane in the back as she sat frozen near them. Her daughter Phyllis had fallen asleep, and Winnifred continued to cry following the loss of her shoes and her feet were left dangling in the freezing water. She stopped crying eventually after a prayer and fell asleep.

Upon the RMS Carpathia's arrival the next morning, Winnifred and Phyllis were pulled aboard via burlap bags while Jane was strapped to a chair and pulled aboard. Fred Quick reunited with his family when the ship docked in New York on 18 April, relieved as he believed he would never see his wife and daughters again. They spent the night at the Hebrew Sheltering and Immigrant Aid Society and later traveled by train home to Detroit where they arrived on 20 April.

=== Later life and death ===
Jane and her husband later had two more daughters, Vivian in 1916 and Virginia in 1918.

Some years after the disaster, she traveled around the US to tell her story. Jane took her daughters on the Vaudeville Theatre circuit around Michigan where they regularly shared their story of survival. After a while, the memories became too painful and she stopped.

Jane died of a coronary on 24 February 1965 at the age of 86 in Grosse Pointe, Michigan. She had outlived both her husband and her daughter Phyllis, who had committed suicide in 1954.

== Winnifred, later years ==
Winnifred occasionally granted interviews but for the most part stayed a private person. The fame intensified following the release of James Cameron's film Titanic in 1997 and a grandson ensured her privacy. She died on 4 July 2002 at the age of 98, the fourth-to-last survivor to die. Her death left Lillian Asplund as the only living survivor with memories of the sinking. Winnifred was the last survivor who did not lose any relatives in the sinking.
