= Frank Tower =

Urban legend

Frank "Lucky" (or "Lucks") Tower is the subject of an urban legend that said that he was a stoker (or fireman, in some versions) who survived the sinking of RMS Titanic, RMS Empress of Ireland, and RMS Lusitania. There is no evidence that anyone was involved in all three disasters, and there was no one with the name of Frank Tower on the crew list on any of these vessels' respective voyages; however, there was one survivor and passenger named Frank Tower from Lusitania, and a William Clark who survived both the Titanic and Empress of Ireland sinkings.

The legend claims that he was a coal stoker on Titanic, and survived after she sank on her maiden voyage on 15 April 1912. Two years later, on 28 May 1914, Frank was allegedly aboard Empress of Ireland when she collided with the Norwegian collier Storstad in the Saint Lawrence River. This disaster was considered the worst peacetime maritime disaster in Canadian history, and Tower was one of only 465 of the 1,477 aboard to survive. During World War I, Tower allegedly was serving as a crew member aboard RMS Lusitania. In the early afternoon of 7 May 1915, she was torpedoed by the German submarine U-20 and sank eighteen minutes later. (It is rumored that he shouted "Now what?!" when the torpedo struck.) Again, Tower escaped the sinking ship, and swam to a nearby lifeboat.

Ripley's Believe It or Not reported the legend as if it were verifiably true.

Clive Cussler briefly cites this legendary figure in his nonfiction book The Sea Hunters, in the chapter concerning the U-20. He relates that after the sinking of Lusitania, Tower swore that he would take up farming and never go to sea again.

== See also ==
- Violet Jessop, who survived the sinking of Titanic and HMHS Britannic, and was on board RMS Olympic when it collided with another ship
- Casimir Polemus, who, according to legend, was the sole survivor of three different shipwrecks
- Arthur Priest, survivor of four different shipwrecks: the RMS Titanic, HMS Alcantara, HMHS Britannic and the SS Donegal; also on board RMS Olympic and RMS Asturias when they collided with other ships
- Tsutomu Yamaguchi, a Japanese marine engineer who survived the bombings of Hiroshima and Nagasaki.
- Tourist guy, another urban legend about a man frequently being present in disasters.
