= Casimir Polemus =

Supposed sole survivor of three shipwrecks

Casimir Polemus is the name of a man supposedly involved in three separate shipwrecks, being the sole survivor of each.

He was born in Ploërmel, France, in the 19th century.

- He sailed with the Jeanne Catherine, which was wrecked off Brest on July 11, 1875.
- Five years later, he again sailed on the Trois Frères, which was wrecked in the Bay of Biscay on September 4, 1880.
- Two years later, he again sailed on L'Odéon, which was wrecked off Newfoundland on January 1, 1882.

Ripley's Believe It or Not reported the legend, assuming that it was true.
