= Grace Hanagan =

Canadian shipwreck survivor (1906–1995)

Grace Hanagan Martyn
- Hanagan in 1986
- Born: Edith Grace Hanagan; July 7, 1906; Oshawa, Ontario, Canada
- Died: May 15, 1995 (aged 88); St. Catharines, Ontario, Canada
- Known for: Youngest and last living survivor of Empress of Ireland disaster
- Spouse: Maurice Martyn
- Children: 1

Edith Grace Martyn (née Hanagan; July 7, 1906 – May 15, 1995) was a Canadian woman who was the youngest and last survivor of the sinking of the RMS Empress of Ireland on May 29, 1914. She was one of four children (out of the 138 children on board) who survived the sinking.

== Early life ==
She was born in Oshawa, Ontario, on July 7, 1906 and was the daughter of Edward James and Edith Emily (Collishaw) Hanagan. Later she moved with her parents to Toronto because her father was the bandmaster of the Salvation Army.

== Empress of Ireland ==
On May 28, 1914, Grace's father was taking her and her mother along with other Salvation Army members (like the Evans family, Staff Captain Meyers, Mr. and Mrs. Maidment, the Leader of the Salvation Army Commissioner David Rees and his family, and others) on the Empress of Ireland that would take them from Quebec City to Liverpool, England for the third International Congress, following which there would be a holiday for their family. Her father conducted the orchestra on the ship in the afternoon. The ship started to set sail at 4:27 in the afternoon, as the orchestra played. Once they had started, Grace and David Rees’ son Harold went on a tour of the ship. To her, it was beautiful, like a lovely hotel, and she was quite thrilled with it. After that, she and her parents went to dinner in the ship's second class dining room at 7:00, and then they prepared to turn in for the night. Grace refused to sleep in a berth that was next to a porthole as she believed this would be "where the water will come in", the memory of the sinking of the RMS Titanic, that had sunk two years earlier, still fresh in everyone’s mind.

That night the family was awakened by a noise, which her father suggested to be the mail pickup, before they were told the ship was sinking. The family ran out as they were, and on the deck, they ran into Ensign Ernest Pugmire. Edward asked for Pugmire's overcoat so he could wrap it around Grace, which Pugmire provided. The ship listed so far on its side that the family couldn't use lifeboats, and went to the high part of the railing and sat with the Evans family until the ship sank. Before the three of them were thrown into the water Grace's parents told her to not be afraid. She went under the water twice until she held onto a piece of wreckage. She lost sight of her parents in the panicking crowd in the water. A few minutes later, Grace saw a couple of lifeboats and called for help. One crowded boat with only two ladies in it while the rest were men, responded and she was pulled aboard, where she lost consciousness, and woke up in a bed on the Storstad, the ship that had collided with the Empress, asking for her mother.

Grace was then taken to a hospital in Rimouski, and the next day the hospital arranged for a train to take her and some other survivors back to Toronto, with Mrs. Atwell (another survivor) watching over her. Before going to the hospital, she had been promised by an officer that he would find her mother, and Grace clung to that promise even after seeing her father's dead body in the Toronto Mortuary, only letting go of the notion a year later.

== Later life ==
Following the death of her parents, Grace lived with her grandparents, uncle, and aunt; her uncle, John William Hanagan became her legal guardian. She eventually went on to live in Niagara Falls, Ontario, working for the Salvation Army. Every year on the anniversary of the sinking she went to Toronto to place a wreath at a cemetery monument honoring the Empress victims. She had a photo of her taken in 1934 with nine other Salvation Army members who survived the sinking: Thomas and Margaret Greenaway, David MacAmmond, Ernest Green, Rufus Spooner, Alfred Keith, Mary Atwell, and Frank and Henrietta Brooks. When she grew older she married Maurice Martyn, with whom she had one son, Gordon, who became a doctor, and settled in St. Catharines. In 1992, she was reported to be in the Toronto area, and attending Highland Road Baptist Church. Years later she still had nightmares over the tragedy, and claimed that the sound of water running in the bathtub would cause terrible shivers and bring back the panic of going down in the water. She did not talk about the disaster unless somebody brought up the subject.

At the age of 78, Martyn reached out to other survivors from the sinking, including Ronald Ferguson, the chief wireless operator of the Empress of Ireland. She got in touch with him on Christmas in 1985 when he was living in or near Chelmsford, England, at 91 years old. Martyn also kept contact with other survivors and Salvation Army members. She remained connected to the Empress of Ireland throughout her life, but was not portrayed as a celebrity, "Nor would I want to be," she said.

== Death ==
Grace Hanagan Martyn died in St. Catharines, Ontario, two weeks before the 1995 memorial service. She was the last living survivor of the disaster, living just short of 81 years after the tragedy.

== Notes ==
- Gives the name of her son, that she lived in Niagara Falls, and that she worked for the Salvation Army. https://www.niagarathisweek.com/news-story/6694295-remembering-the-empress-of-ireland/ (Remembering the Empress of Ireland)
- Two movies where Grace had some interviews of her experience on the Empress of Ireland. http://fashionation.tv/the-last-voyage-of-the-empress/ (The Last Voyage of the Empress - Part 1 of 5 on Vimeo) and, http://www.cbc.ca/archives/categories/economy-business/transport/empress-of-ireland-sinks-in-the-st-lawrence.html (1914: Empress of Ireland sinks in the St. Lawrence - CBC)
- Where Grace tells her story on the Empress of Ireland http://www.empress2014.ca/seclangen/prttprsnlt.html (Commemoration Empress of Ireland 2014), http://titanicfan1000.deviantart.com/art/The-Empress-of-Ireland-243325629 (The Empress of Ireland by ~Titanicfan1000 on deviantART), and https://books.google.com/books?id=moAQgQWX5-4C&dq=grace+hanagan&pg=PA28 (Losing the Empress: A Personal Journey) It also shows a picture of her and 9 other survivors on page 214.))
- Show that Grace did married and had a son, https://web.archive.org/web/20120306002004/http://www.sacollectables.com/empress.html (Salvation Army Collectables - The Empress Of Ireland)
- Guestbook archives:
  - https://web.archive.org/web/20120302055245/http://www.sea-viewdiving.com/shipwreck_info/empress_home/guestbookarchive.htm (Empress of Ireland - Guest Book Archive - Sea-View Diving)
  - http://www.scubaboard.com/forums/archive/index.php/t-170389.html (Empress of Ireland survivor [Archive] - ScubaBoard)
  - https://web.archive.org/web/20120218130135/http://www.sea-viewdiving.com/shipwreck_info/empress_home/empbook/empressguests.htm (Empress of Ireland - Guestbook - Sea-View Diving) it tells that the Evans family was with Grace and her parents when the ship was ready to plunge.
- Encyclopedia Titanica http://www.encyclopedia-titanica.org/discus/messages/33551/124965.html?1212009517 (Child Survivors - Encyclopedia Titanica) and http://www.encyclopedia-titanica.org/discus/messages/33551/66437.html?1056018674 (Empress Passengers & a list - Encyclopedia Titanica)
- Google News https://news.google.com/newspapers?id=7HZkAAAAIBAJ&sjid=_X4NAAAAIBAJ&pg=2299,2882308&dq=empress+of+ireland+grace+hanagan&hl=en (Empress of Ireland sinking living history for woman) tells who raised Grace after losing her parents in the sinking, tells where she was born, and having connection with other Empress survivors.
- Internet Archives https://archive.org/stream/war-cry-1914_06_13M/1914_06_13M#page/n3/mode/1up tells that Ernest Pugmire gave his overcoat to Grace.
- Chronicling America https://chroniclingamerica.loc.gov/lccn/sn87055779/1914-06-01/ed-1/seq-1/#date1=1914&index=7&rows=20&words=Empress+Ireland&searchType=basic&sequence=0&state=Indiana&date2=1914&proxtext=Empress+of+Ireland&y=0&x=0&dateFilterType=yearRange&page=1 tells that Grace's parents told her to not be afraid while the Empress of Ireland was sinking and that the lifeboat that saved her only had two ladies in.
