= Colin Simpson (English journalist) =

Colin Malcolm Macrae Simpson (14 July 1931 – 31 October 2017) was a war correspondent and investigative journalist for The Sunday Times. He also wrote a number of non-fiction books. After an accident, he became a keen gardener and started the business Simpson's Seeds.

Simpson's 1972 book on the sinking of the RMS Lusitania popularised the conspiracy theory that Winston Churchill was responsible for the sinking of the ship. It has been strongly criticised by historians for factual errors and outright fabrications, with some claiming it should not be described as nonfiction.

In particular, Keith Allen noted that Simpson referred to Lieutenant Commander Joseph Kenworthy as a British naval intelligence officer providing a key eyewitness account of alleged Admiralty conferences on the ocean liner prior to her sinking. However, page references to publications by Kenworthy were found to discuss unrelated topics, and though in later life Kenworthy did support the Lusitania conspiracy theory, according to his own autobiography and additional documentary evidence, he had never worked for naval intelligence and was at sea at the time in command of HMS Bullfinch. With these and other "distortions", and because Simpson did not respond when alerted of alleged fabrications, Allen concluded Simpson's work to be "inexpressibly dishonest".

== Selected publications ==
- Sir Francis Chichester: Voyage of the Century. Sphere, London, 1967. (With Christopher Angeloglou)
- The Secret Lives of Lawrence of Arabia. Nelson, London, 1969. (With Phillip Knightley)
- The Ship That Hunted Itself. Weidenfeld and Nicolson, London, 1971.
- Lusitania. Little, Brown and Company, 1972. ISBN 9780140068030
- The Cleveland Street Affair. Little Brown, 1976. (With Lewis Chester & David Leitch)
- Mugabe: A Biography. Sphere, London, 1981. (With David Smith) ISBN 978-0722178683
- Emma: The Life of Lady Hamilton. Bodley Head, London, 1983. ISBN 0370309847
- The Partnership: The Secret Association of Bernard Berenson and Joseph Duveen. Bodley Head, London, 1987. ISBN 037030585X
