= Sinking of RMS Empress of Ireland =

1914 maritime disaster

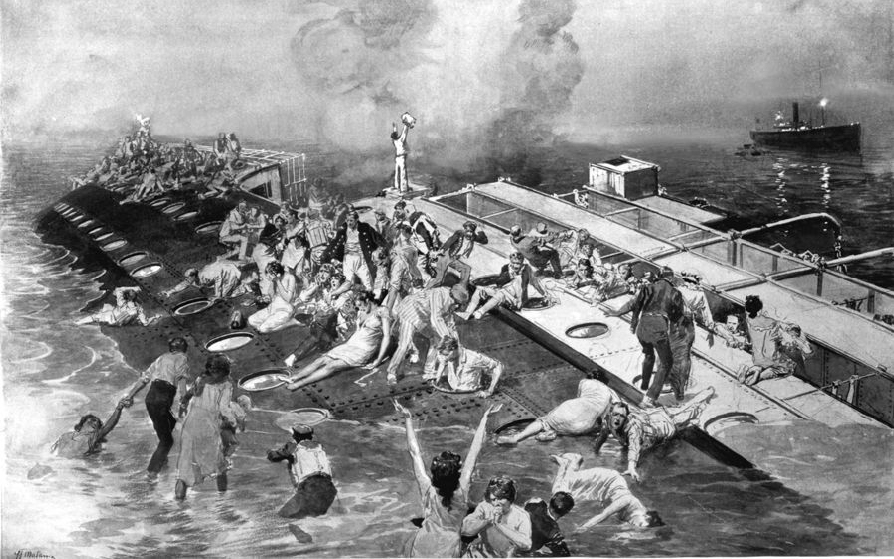
- Contemporary illustration of the Empress of Ireland disaster
- Date: 29 May 1914; 112 years ago
- Time: 01:56–02:10 EST (06:56–07:10 GMT)
- Duration: 14 minutes
- Location: St. Lawrence River near Rimouski, Quebec, Canada; 48°37.5′N 68°24.5′W
- Type: Maritime disaster
- Cause: Collision with the SS Storstad
- Participants: Empress of Ireland crew and passengers
- Deaths: 1,000–1,100

RMS Empress of Ireland sank near the mouth of the St. Lawrence River in Canada following a collision in thick fog with the Norwegian collier Storstad in the early hours of 29 May 1914. She had just begun her 96th voyage, departing Quebec City and heading to Liverpool.

Although the ship was equipped with watertight compartments and, in the aftermath of the sinking of the RMS Titanic two years earlier, carried more than enough lifeboats for all aboard, she foundered only 14 minutes after the collision. Of the 1,477 people on board, 1,012 died, making it the worst peacetime maritime disaster in Canadian history and one of the worst of the 20th century.

Despite being one of the worst disasters of its time, the sinking of the Empress of Ireland was ultimately overshadowed by the prior sinking of the RMS Titanic and the later sinking of the RMS Lusitania as well as the events leading to and the outbreak of World War I a few weeks after the tragedy occurred. In the 21st century, however, commemorations have been held and memorials have been erected in Canada to mark the tragic sinking and the wreck of the Empress was declared a National Historic Site of Canada in 2009.

== Sinking ==
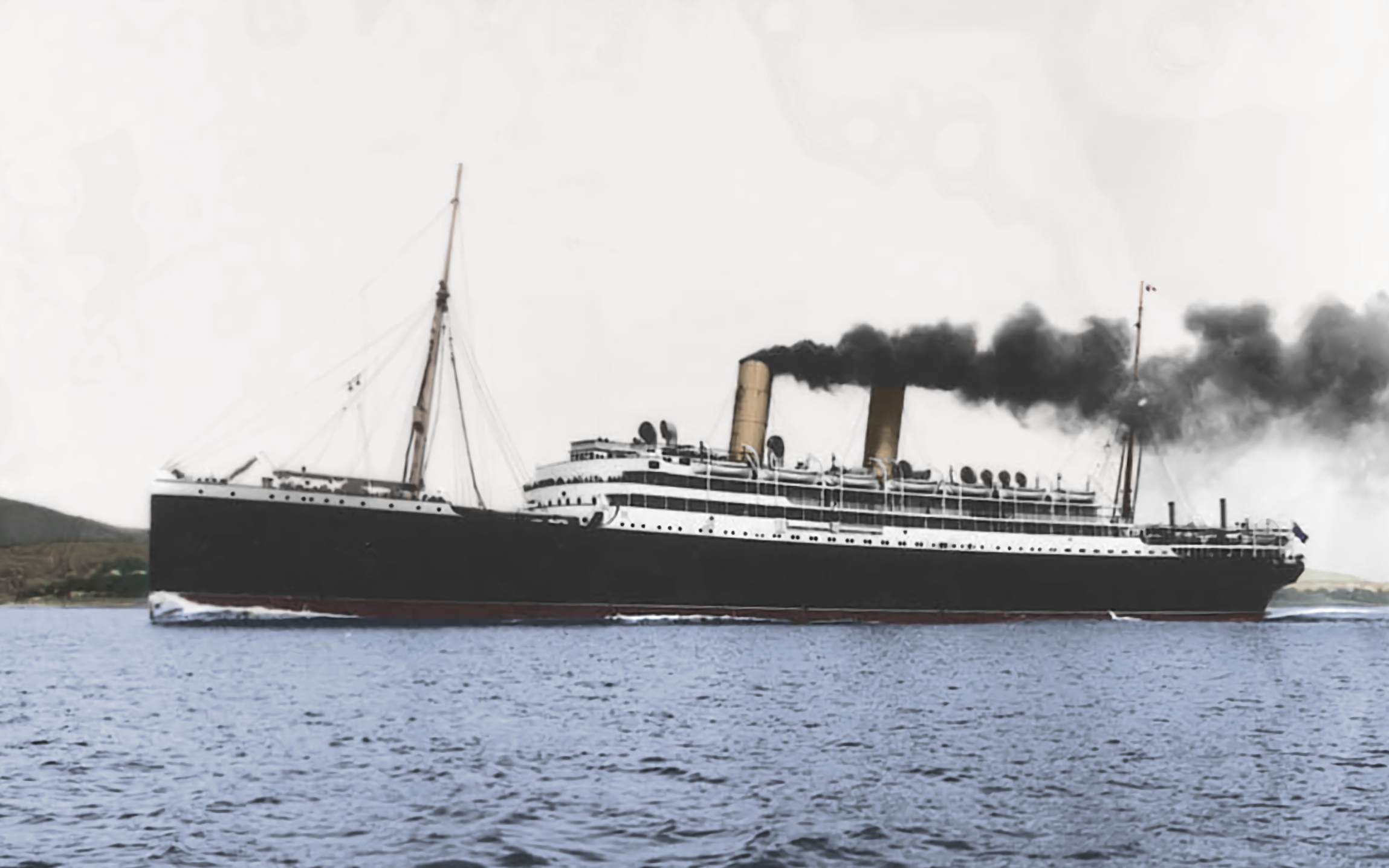
Colourised photo of the Empress of Ireland

On 28 May 1914, Empress of Ireland departed Quebec City for Liverpool at 16:30 local time (EST). It was manned by a crew of 420 and carrying 1,057 passengers, roughly two thirds of her total capacity. Henry George Kendall had been promoted to captain of Empress of Ireland earlier that month, and it was his first trip down the St. Lawrence River in command of her.

The ship reached Pointe-au-Père in the early hours of 29 May 1914, where the pilot disembarked. She resumed a normal outward bound course of about N76E (076 degrees) and soon sighted the masthead lights of SS Storstad, a Norwegian collier, on her starboard bow at a distance of several miles. Likewise, Storstad, which was abreast of Métis Point and on a virtually reciprocal course of W. by S. (259 degrees), sighted Empress of Ireland's masthead lights. These first sightings were made in clear weather conditions, but fog soon enveloped the ships. The ships resorted to repeated use of their fog whistles. At 01:56 local time Storstad crashed into Empress of Ireland's starboard side at around midships. Storstad remained afloat, but Empress of Ireland was severely damaged. A gaping hole in her side caused the lower decks to flood at a rate alarming to the crew. Captain Kendall shouted to the crew of Storstad with a megaphone to keep her engines at full power and plug the hole, but Empress of Ireland continued her forward motion, and the current of the St. Lawrence shoved Storstad away after about five seconds, allowing 60,000 imperial gallons (270,000 litres) of water per second to begin pouring into Empress of Ireland.

In the ship's wireless room, Marconi operators Edward Bamford, who was on watch at the time, and Ronald Ferguson, the chief operator who had just turned in, were put on alert by the collision. Receiving permission from the Chief officer to send a distress call, they did so immediately and contacted the Pointe-au-Père Marconi station: "May have struck ship... listing terribly." They notified rescuers on shore of their position twenty miles from Rimouski.

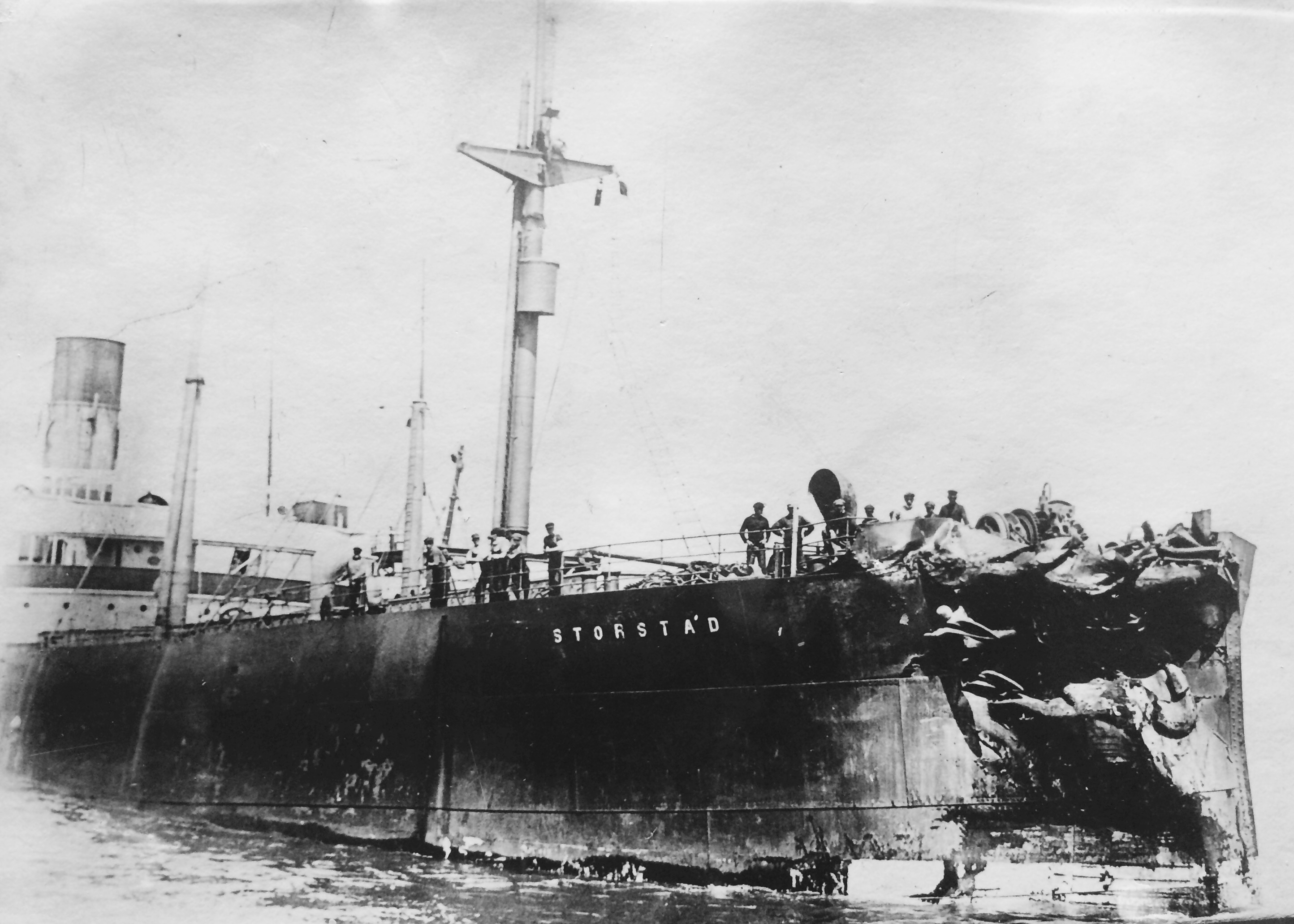
Damage sustained by Storstad after its collision with Empress of Ireland.

Empress of Ireland lurched heavily to starboard and began settling by the stern. There was no time to shut the watertight doors. Water entered through open portholes, some only a few feet above the water line, and inundated passageways and cabins. Most of the passengers and crew located in the lower decks drowned quickly. Those berthed in the upper decks were awakened by the collision and immediately boarded lifeboats on the boat deck. Within a few minutes, the ship's list was so severe that the port lifeboats could not be launched. Some passengers attempted to do so but the lifeboats just crashed into the side of the ship, spilling their occupants into the frigid water. Five starboard lifeboats were launched successfully, while a sixth and seventh capsized during lowering.

The lights and power on Empress of Ireland eventually failed five or six minutes after the collision, plunging the ship into darkness. Ten minutes after the collision, the ship rolled violently over her starboard side, allowing as many as 700 passengers and crew to crawl out of the portholes and decks onto her port side. The ship lay upon her side for a minute or two, having seemingly run aground. Shortly afterwards at 02:10, about 14 minutes after the collision, the bow rose briefly out of the water and the ship finally sank. Hundreds of people were thrown into the near-freezing water. The disaster resulted in the deaths of 1,012 people.

== Passengers and crew ==
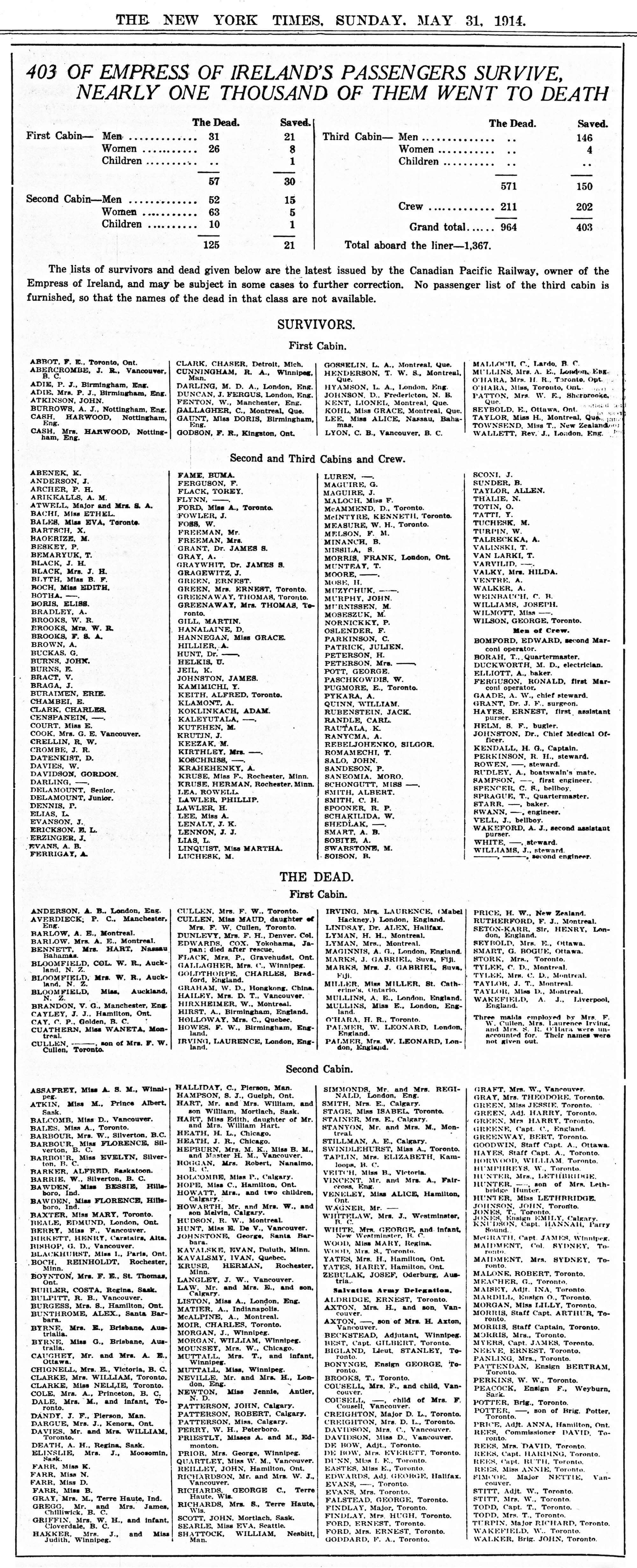
The New York Times published this list of survivors and casualties two days after the disaster.

There were only 465 survivors: 4 children (of 138), 41 women (of 310), 172 men (of 609), and 248 crew (of 420). The fact that most passengers were asleep at the time of the sinking (most not even awakened by the collision) also contributed to the loss of life when they were drowned in their cabins, most of them from the starboard side where the collision happened.

In first class, the list of passengers was relatively small, with only 87 booked passages. Second class saw a considerably larger booking at just over half capacity with 253 passengers, owed greatly to a large party of Salvation Army members and their families, numbering 170 in all, who were travelling to attend the 3rd International Salvation Army Congress in London.

Third class saw the largest booking, which with 717 passengers was nearly filled to capacity. This complement reflected greatly the typical mix of steerage travellers seen on eastbound crossings aboard Empress of Ireland and her running mates on the North Atlantic which paralleled that seen on westbound crossings from Liverpool. While on westbound crossings third class passengers were predominantly diverse mixes of immigrants, eastbound crossings saw equally diverse blends of former immigrants from both Canada and the United States returning to their native countries in Europe. Many were returning to visit relatives, while others were in the process of re-emigrating and resettling.

=== Total numbers saved and lost ===
The exact numbers of passengers and crew of the sunken ship who either died or were saved was not established until the inquiry. This was because of discrepancies in the names of the passengers shown on the manifest (particularly in regard to the continentals) and the names given by the survivors. As a consequence, initial reports in the newspapers were incomplete.

Number of people on board and death toll
| Persons on board | Numbers on board | Percentage by total onboard | Numbers lost | Percentage lost by total onboard | Numbers saved | Percentage saved by total onboard | Percentage survival rate per group |
| Crew | 420 | 28.4% | 172 | 11.6% | 248 | 16.8% | 59.0% |
| Passengers | 1,057 | 71.6% | 840 | 56.9% | 217 | 14.7% | 20.5% |
| Total | 1,477 | 100% | 1,012 | 68.5% | 465 | 31.5% | – |
Passengers by class
| 1st Class | 87 | 5.9% | 51 | 3.4% | 36 | 2.4% | 41.4% |
| 2nd Class | 253 | 17.1% | 205 | 13.9% | 48 | 3.2% | 19.0% |
| 3rd Class | 717 | 48.5% | 584 | 39.5% | 133 | 9.0% | 18.5% |
Passengers by age and sex
| Girls | 73 | 4.9% | 70 | 4.7% | 3 | 0.2% | 4.1% |
| Boys | 65 | 4.4% | 64 | 4.3% | 1 | 0.1% | 1.5% |
| Women | 310 | 21.0% | 269 | 18.2% | 41 | 2.8% | 13.2% |
| Men | 609 | 41.2% | 437 | 29.6% | 172 | 11.6% | 28.2% |

=== Rescue operations and survivors ===
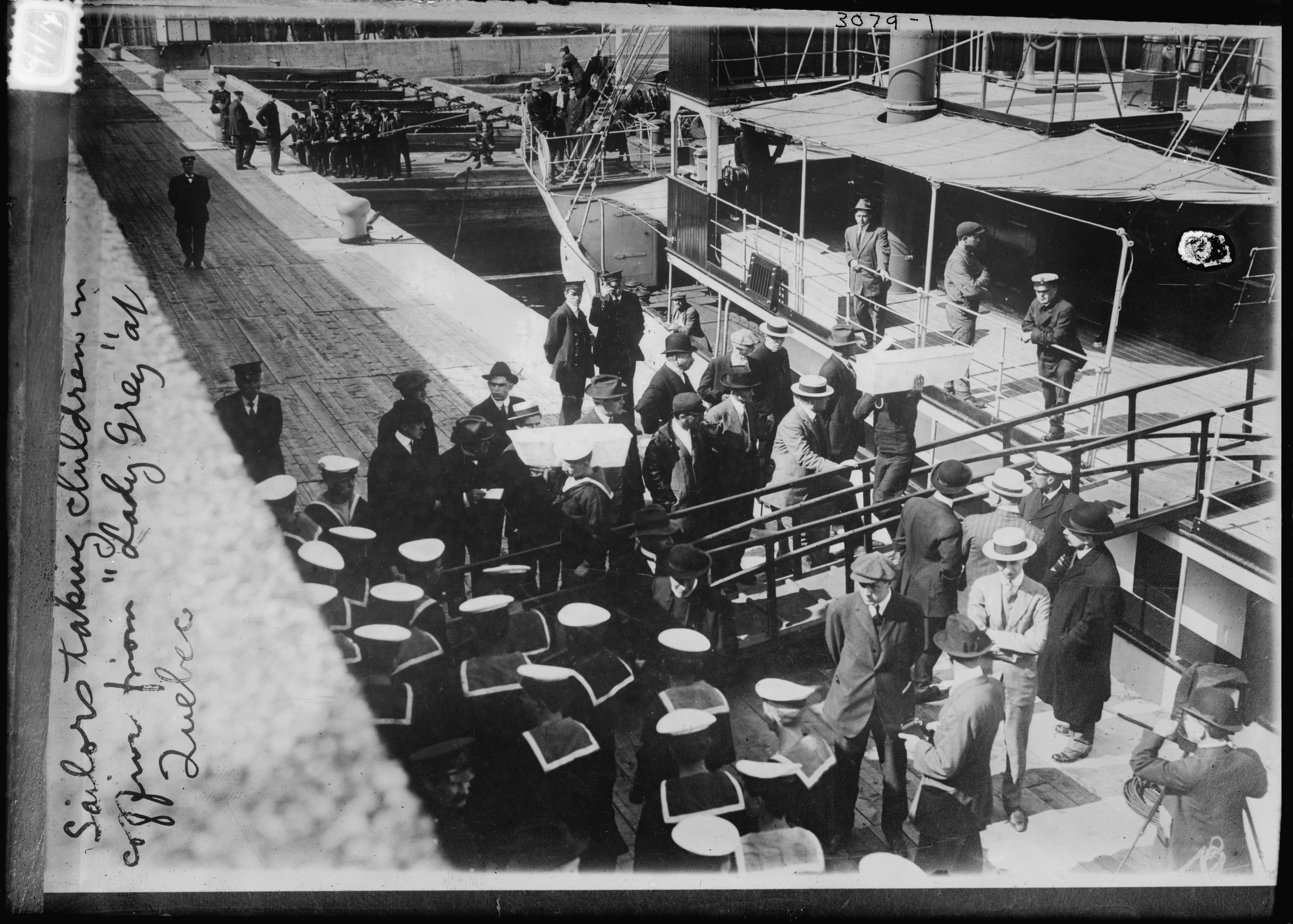
Unloading the coffins of the children from Lady Grey

Storstad, which remained afloat, lowered her own lifeboats and began to rescue the survivors in the water. The radio operator at Pointe-au-Père who picked up the emergency signal from Empress of Ireland notified two Canadian government steamers: the pilot boat Eureka at Pointe-au-Père Wharf, which left the wharf at full steam at 02:30; followed by the mail ship Lady Evelyn at Rimouski Wharf which left at 02:45. Eureka was first on the scene at 03:10 and rescued about 150 survivors from the water. She brought the survivors first to Pointe-au-Père, but was redirected to Rimouski Wharf where doctors and relief supplies were waiting. Lady Evelyn arrived at the site of sinking at 03:45. No survivors were left in the water but Lady Evelyn collected the 200 survivors rescued by Storstad, as well as 133 bodies, and arrived to join Eureka at the Rimouski Wharf about 05:15. Storstad was damaged but not severely, so her captain continued on to Quebec.

One of the survivors was Captain Kendall, who was on the bridge at the time of the collision and quickly ordered the lifeboats to be launched. When Empress of Ireland lurched onto her side, he was thrown from the bridge into the water, and was taken down with her as she began to go under. Swimming to the surface, he clung to a wooden grate long enough for crew members aboard a nearby lifeboat to row over and pull him in. Immediately, Kendall took command of the small boat and began rescue operations. The lifeboat's crew successfully pulled in many people from the water, and when the boat was full, Kendall ordered the crew to row to the lights of Storstad so that the survivors could be dropped off. He and the crew made a few more trips between Storstad and the wreck site to search for more survivors. After an hour or two, Kendall gave up, since any survivors who were still in the water would have either succumbed to hypothermia or drowned by then. Upon first boarding Storstad, Kendall stormed to the bridge, and levied an accusation at Captain Thomas Andersen: "You have sunk my ship!"

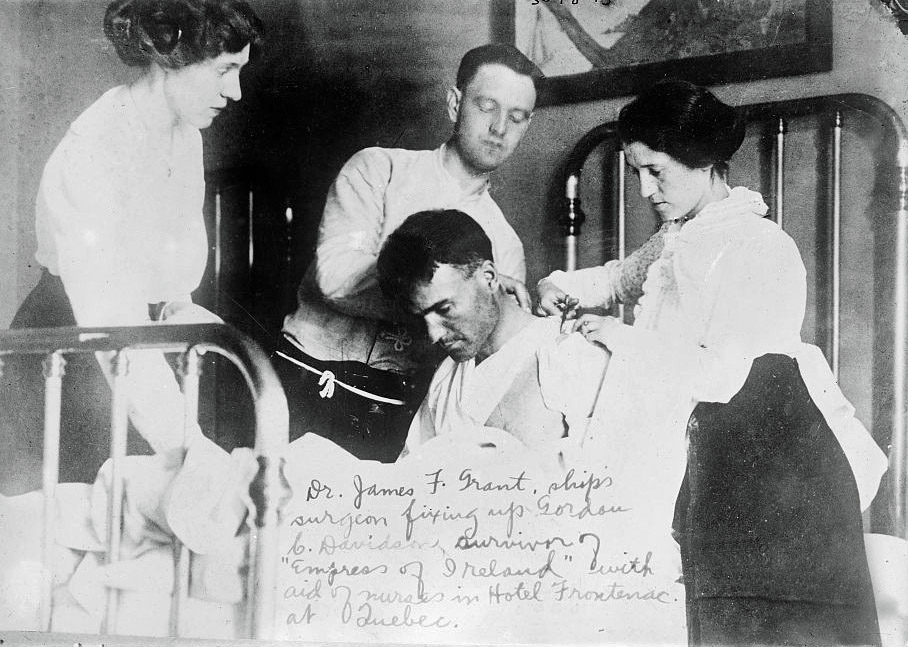
Dr. James Grant treated fellow survivor Gordon G. Davidson in Quebec.

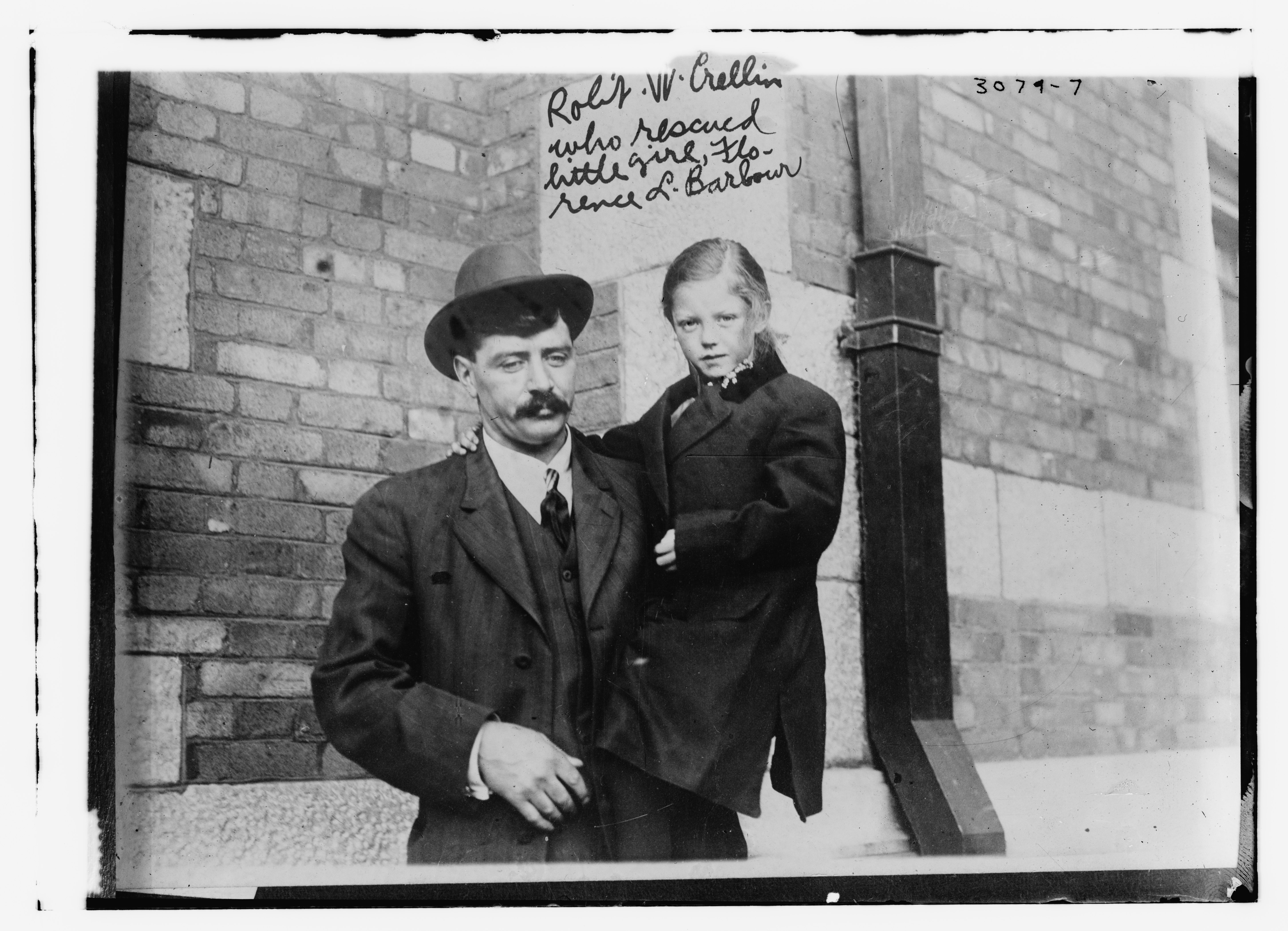
Robert W. Crellin, Silverstone, B.C., rescued young Florence L. Barbour.

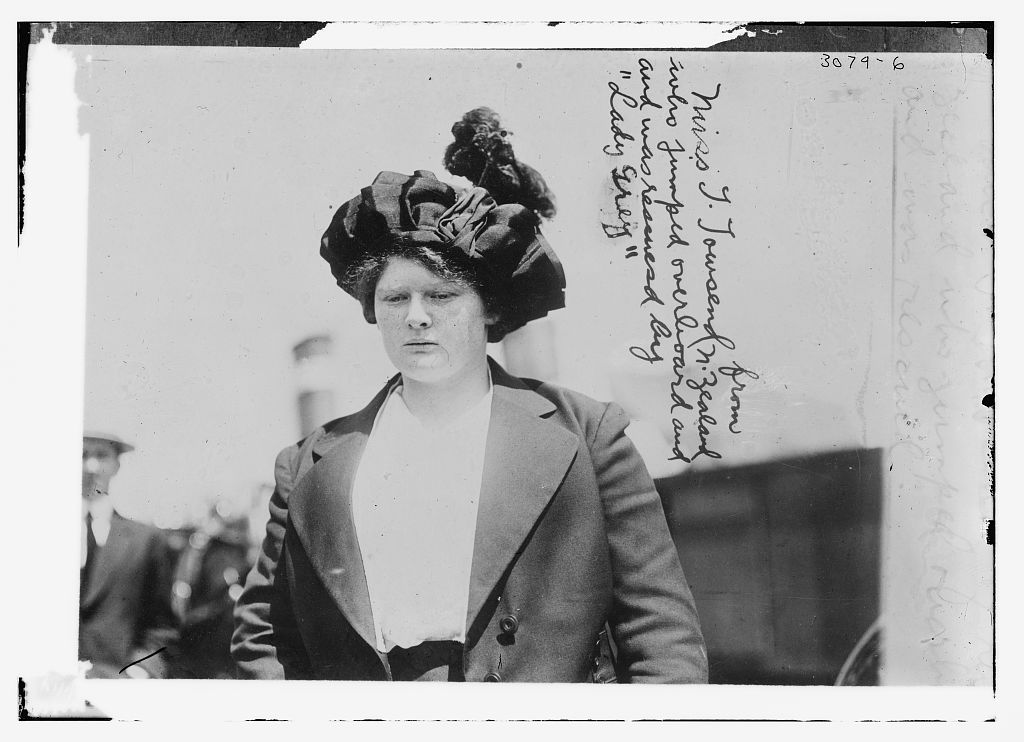
New Zealander Tiria Towsend jumped overboard and was rescued by the Lady Grey.

Amongst the dead were the English dramatist and novelist Laurence Irving and his wife Mabel Hackney; the explorer Henry Seton-Karr; Ella Hart-Bennett, the wife of British government official William Hart-Bennett; and Gabriel J. Marks, the first mayor of Suva, Fiji, along with his wife Marion. Lieutenant Charles Lindsay Claude Bowes-Lyon, a first cousin of the future Queen Elizabeth The Queen Mother survived the disaster, but died in combat only five months later on the Western Front near Ypres.

The passengers included 167 members of the Salvation Army. These travellers, all but eight of whom died, were members of the Canadian Staff Band who were travelling to London for an international conference. One of the four children who survived was 7-year-old Grace Hanagan, who was born in Oshawa, Ontario, on 16 May 1907, and was travelling with her parents, who were among the Salvation Army members who did not survive. Grace was also the last survivor of the sinking and died in St. Catharines, Ontario, on 15 May 1995 at the age of 87.

"I was travelling second-class with three others in my cabin. I was sure something was wrong when the blow occurred. When I heard the vessel’s siren blowing I jumped up in my bunk, took a lifebelt from the rack over me, and threw the others to the girls. They did not want them at first. I was serious and made them put them on, and as a result they are saved.

"How I got into the water I do not know. I was getting away from the swarm of people who were around the ship when a big man, wounded in the head, approached and clung to me. I was trying to shake him off, for he was pulling me down, when I saw his head fall forward. I knew he was dead. He drifted away and disappeared. I do not know who it was; it was horrible. I was drifting away myself. When the boat sank the suction took me down. I involuntarily began to paddle with my feet and came to the surface. Then I saw a man swimming. It was then quite light. I watched him, and though I cannot swim a stroke I imitated his arm motions and found I got along a little. I was picked up.

"When I got to the wharf I found I was the first woman landed. Some one gave me a blanket, and I sat with that on me for about an hour until he came up" – and she indicated Mr. Johnson, who was sitting beside her."

—Testimonial from Passenger Alice Bales, 21 years old.

As for Storstad's Chief Officer Alfred Toftenes, little is known of what became of him except that he died in New York City a few years later, in 1918. He is buried in Green-Wood Cemetery in Brooklyn. (Note: Alfred C. Toftenas (sic) buried 22 April 1918, Green-Wood Cemetery, Lot 34969, Section 131.)

Robert Crellin saved over twenty people and became famous for his heroics during the disaster.

William Clark was a passenger who survived both the sinkings of the Titanic and the Empress of Ireland.

Frank Tower is an urban legend that claims to be a fireman aboard the Titanic, Empress of Ireland, and the RMS Lusitania. There is no concrete proof to support this claim that he was on all three ships.

== Aftermath ==
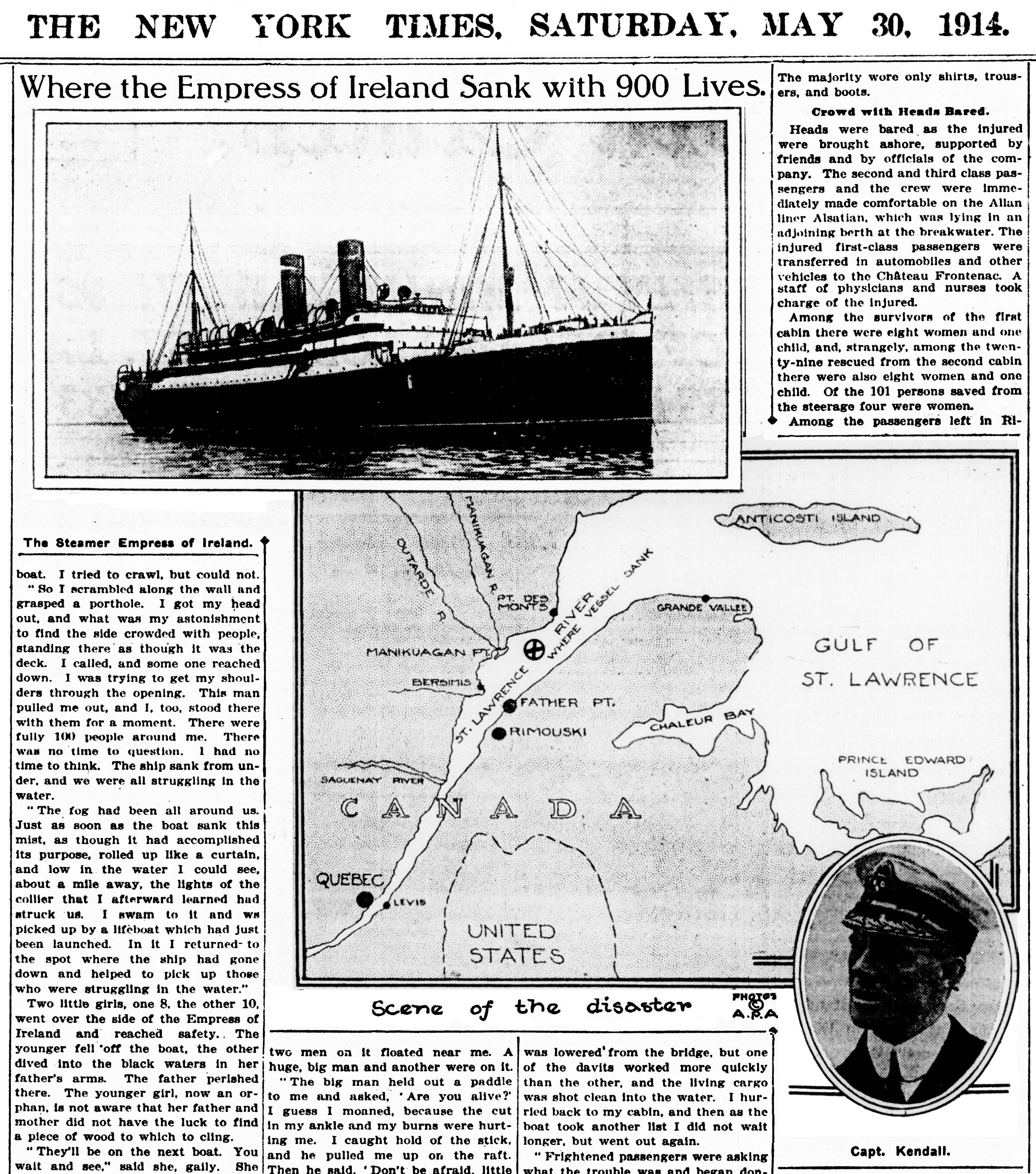
The New York Times reporting the sinking of the RMS Empress of Ireland on May 30, 1914

As reported in the newspapers at the time, there was much confusion as to the cause of the collision with both parties claiming the other was at fault. As was noted at the subsequent inquiry, "If the testimony of both captains were to be believed, the collision happened as both vessels were stationary with their engines stopped". The witnesses from Storstad said they were approaching so as to pass red to red (port to port) while those from Empress of Ireland said they were approaching so as to pass green to green (starboard to starboard), but "the stories are irreconcilable".

Ultimately, the swift sinking and immense loss of life can be attributed to three factors: the location in which Storstad made contact, failure to close Empress of Ireland's watertight doors, and longitudinal bulkheads that exacerbated the list by inhibiting cross flooding. A contributing factor was open portholes. Surviving passengers and crew testified that some upper portholes were left open for ventilation. The International Convention for the Safety of Life at Sea (SOLAS) requires that any openable portholes be closed and locked before leaving port, but portholes were often left open in sheltered waters like the St. Lawrence River where heavy seas were not expected. When Empress of Ireland began to list to starboard, water poured through the open portholes further increasing flooding.

On 5 June 1914, Canadian Pacific Steamships (CPR), who had commissioned the Empress of Ireland, announced it had chartered the Allan Line's RMS Virginian to fill in the void in service in its fleet left by the loss of Empress of Ireland, joining Empress of Britain and other previously acquired Canadian Pacific ships on the St. Lawrence run. Virginian embarked from her first voyage from Liverpool under Canadian Pacific service on 12 June, which was to have been the next departure date from Liverpool of Empress of Ireland.

=== Litigation ===
The CPR won a court case against A. F. Klaveness & Co, the owners of Storstad, for C$2 million, which is the valuation of silver bullion stored aboard Empress of Ireland when she sank. The owners of Storstad entered an unsuccessful counterclaim against the CPR for $50,000 damages, contending that Empress of Ireland was at fault and alleging negligent navigation on her part. Storstad was seized at the request of the CPR and sold for $175,000 to Prudential Trust, an insurance company acting on behalf of AF Klaveness & Co.

== Inquiry ==
=== Commissioners ===
The Commission of Inquiry, held in Quebec, commenced on 16 June 1914 and lasted for eleven days. Presiding over the contentious proceedings was Lord Mersey, who had previously presided over the SOLAS summit the year before, and had headed the official inquiries into a number of significant steamship tragedies, including that of Titanic. The following year, he would lead the inquiry into the sinking of Lusitania. Assisting Lord Mersey were two other commissioners: Sir Adolphe-Basile Routhier of Quebec, and Chief Justice Ezekiel McLeod of New Brunswick. All three commissioners were officially appointed by John Douglas Hazen, the Minister of Marine and Fisheries of Canada, under Part X of the Canada Shipping Act.

=== Twenty questions ===
At the beginning of the Inquiry twenty questions were formulated by the Canadian government. For example, was Empress of Ireland sufficiently and efficiently officered and manned? (Q.4); after the vessels had sighted each other's lights did the atmosphere between them become foggy or misty, so that lights could no longer be seen? If so, did both vessels comply with SOLAS Articles 15 and 16, and did they respectively indicate on their steam whistles or sirens, the course or courses they were taking by the signals set out? (Q.11); was a good and proper lookout kept on board of both vessels? (Q.19); and, was the loss of Empress of Ireland or the loss of life, caused by the wrongful act or default of the Master and First Officer of that vessel, and the Master, First, Second and Third Officers of Storstad, or any of them? (Q.20). All of these questions were addressed by the inquiry and answered in full in its report.

=== Witnesses ===
The inquiry heard testimony from a total of sixty-one witnesses: twenty-four crew and officers of Empress of Ireland (including Captain Kendall); twelve crew and officers of Storstad (including Captain Andersen); five passengers of Empress of Ireland; and twenty other people including two divers, two Marconi wireless operators at Pointe-au-Père, two naval architects, the harbour master at Quebec, and crew and officers of several other ships whose involvement either directly or indirectly was deemed pertinent.

=== Two accounts ===
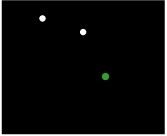
Illustrative navigation lights of Storstad as were claimed to have been seen from Empress of Ireland.

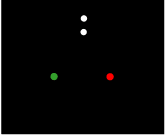
Illustrative navigation lights of Empress of Ireland as were claimed to have been seen from Storstad.

Two very different accounts of the collision were given at the inquiry. Empress of Ireland's crew reported that after the pilot had been dropped at Pointe-au-Père, the ship proceeded to sea at full speed in order to obtain an offing from the shore. After a short time the masthead lights of a steamer, which subsequently proved to be Storstad, were sighted on the starboard bow, approximately six nautical miles (eleven kilometres) away, the weather at that time being fine and clear. After continuing for some time, Empress of Ireland altered her course with the object of proceeding down the river. When making this change, the masthead lights of Storstad were still visible, about 4 1/2 nautical miles (8 kilometres) away, and according to Captain Kendall it was intended to pass Storstad starboard to starboard at no risk of collision. The green light of Storstad was then sighted, but a little later a fog bank was seen coming off the land that dimmed Storstad's lights. The engines of Empress of Ireland were then stopped (and put full speed astern) and her whistle blown three short blasts signifying that this had been done. About a minute later the fog shut out the lights of Storstad completely. After exchanging further whistle blasts with Storstad, her masthead and side lights were seen by Captain Kendall about 100 feet away almost at right angles to Empress of Ireland and approaching at high speed. In the hope of possibly avoiding or minimizing the effect of a collision, the engines of Empress of Ireland were ordered full speed ahead, but it was too late and Storstad struck Empress of Ireland amidships. Kendall placed the blame firmly on Storstad for the collision. Famously, the first words he said to Captain Andersen of Storstad after the sinking were, "You have sunk my ship!". He maintained for the rest of his life that it was not his fault the collision occurred.

Storstad's crew reported that the masthead lights of Empress of Ireland were first seen on the port bow about 6 or seven nautical miles (thirteen kilometres) away; the lights were at that time open to starboard. A few minutes later, the green side light of Empress of Ireland was seen apparently from three to five nautical miles (six to nine kilometres) away. The green light remained for an interval, and then Empress of Ireland was seen to make a change in her course. Her masthead lights came into a (vertical) line, and she showed both the green and the red side lights. She then continued to swing to starboard, shutting out the green and showing only the red light. This light was observed for a few minutes before being obscured by the fog. At this moment, Empress of Ireland was about two miles away and Storstad's Chief Officer, Mr. Toftenes, assumed that it was Empress of Ireland's intention to pass him port to port (red to red), which the ships would do with ample room if their relative positions were maintained. After an exchange of whistle blasts with Empress of Ireland, Storstad was slowed and Captain Andersen (who was asleep in his cabin at the time) was called to the bridge. When he arrived, Andersen saw a masthead light moving quickly across Storstad's course from port to starboard whereupon he ordered the engines full speed astern. Immediately after Andersen saw the masthead light, he saw the green light, and a few moments later saw Empress of Ireland and the ships then collided.

=== Report ===
After all the evidence that had been heard, the Commissioners stated that the question as to who was to blame resolved itself into a simple issue, namely which of the two ships changed her course during the fog. They could come to "no other conclusion" than that it was Storstad that ported her helm and changed her course to starboard, and so brought about the collision. Chief Officer Toftenes of Storstad was specifically blamed for wrongly and negligently altering his course in the fog and, in addition, failing to call the captain when he saw the fog coming on.

After the official inquiry was completed, Captain Andersen was quoted as saying that Lord Mersey was a "fool" for holding him responsible for the collision. He also announced that he intended to file a lawsuit against the CPR.
