= SS Storstad =

Steam cargo ship

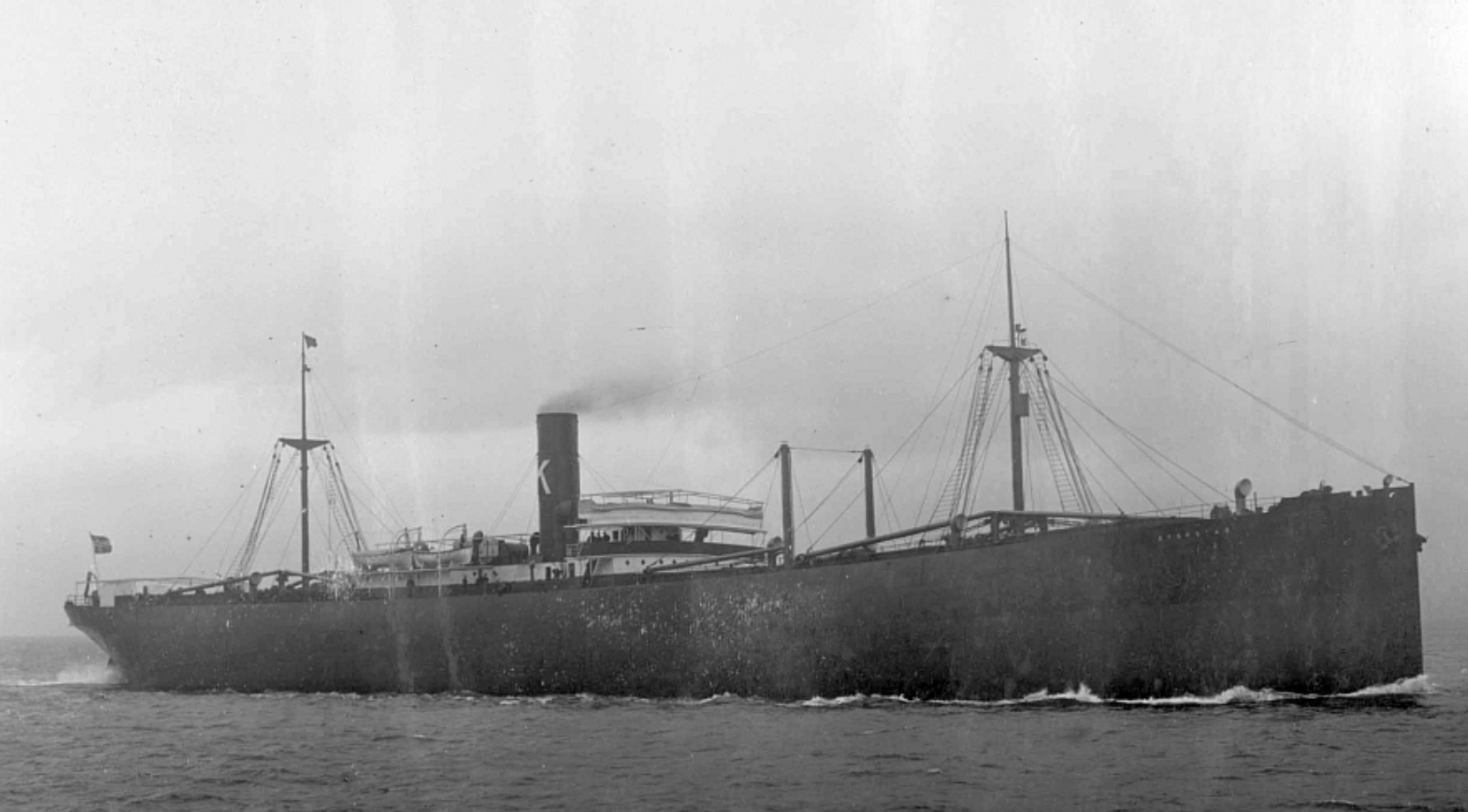
- Storstad leaving port in 1912

History

Norway
- Name: Storstad
- Owner: A. F. Klaveness; Canadian Pacific Railway (1914)
- Operator: A/S "Maritim" (1911-1914)
- Port of registry: Kristiania (Oslo), Norway
- Builder: Armstrong, Whitworth & Co, Newcastle
- Yard number: 824
- Launched: 4 October 1910
- Commissioned: January 1911
- Out of service: 8 March 1917
- Home port: Kristiania
- Identification: Code letters MGJD
- Fate: Torpedoed and sunk, 8 March 1917

General characteristics
- Type: Cargo Ship
- Tonnage: 6,028 GRT; 3,561 NRT; 10,650 DWT
- Length: 440.0 ft (134.1 m)
- Beam: 58.1 ft (17.7 m)
- Depth: 24.6 ft (7.5 m)
- Installed power: 447 nhp
- Propulsion: North Eastern Marine Engineering Co. 3-cylinder triple expansion
- Speed: 13 knots (24 km/h; 15 mph)

Storstad was a steam cargo ship built in 1910 by Armstrong, Whitworth & Co Ltd of Newcastle for A. F. Klaveness & Co of Sandefjord, Norway. The ship was primarily employed as an ore and coal carrier doing tramp trade during her career. In May 1914 she accidentally rammed and sank the ocean liner RMS Empress of Ireland, killing over 1,000 people. During the First World War, Storstad was torpedoed and sunk by the German submarine U-62.

== Design and construction ==
Storstad was laid down at Armstrong, Whitworth & Co Low Walker shipyard in Newcastle and launched on 4 October 1910 (yard number 824). As the ship was being launched, she struck a nearby steamship SS Dardania from Trieste, and her stern was damaged. After successful completion of sea trials, during which the vessel was able to reach speed of 13.0 knots (15.0 mph; 24.1 km/h), Storstad was handed over to her owners and fully commissioned in January 1911. To operate the vessel, she was transferred to a separate company, Aktieselskabet "Maritim", owned by A. F. Klaveness.

The ship was built on the Isherwood longitudinal framing principle, and at the time of her launch was the largest vessel to be constructed in this manner. The ship was specifically designed for coal and iron ore carriage, and had very large hatches built, with ten powerful winches installed for quick cargo discharge. As built, the ship was 440.0 feet (134.1 m) long (between perpendiculars) and 58.1 feet (17.7 m) abeam, a mean draft of 24 feet 6 inches (7.47 m). Storstad was assessed at 6,028 gross register tons (GRT), 3,561 net register tons (NRT) and had deadweight tonnage of approximately 10,650. The vessel had a steel hull, and a single 447 nominal horsepower triple-expansion steam engine, with cylinders of 28 1/2-inch (72 cm), 47-inch (120 cm), and 78-inch (200 cm) diameter with a 54-inch (140 cm) stroke, that drove a single screw propeller, and moved the ship at up to 13 knots (24 km/h; 15 mph).

== Operational history ==
Upon delivery, Storstad departed on 31 January 1911 for her maiden voyage from Newcastle for Narvik and arrived there on 4 February. The vessel loaded 9,609 tons of iron ore and sailed for Philadelphia on 11 February reaching it on 7 March. At the time, this was the largest cargo of iron ore unloaded at Philadelphia from a single ship. Storstad then proceeded to Jacksonville where she took on 6,500 tons of phosphate rock on 17 March, then continued on to Savannah and loaded 8,071 bales of cotton and departed for Hamburg on 28 March. Upon return from Europe on 20 May 1911 the ship was chartered to transport iron ore and coal from Wabana and North Sydney to Montreal and other ports along St. Lawrence River through the end of navigational season in late November.

In November 1911 the vessel was chartered for one trip to South America by the Barber Line. Storstad left New York on 3 December 1911 and arrived in Buenos Aires on 30 December, after a call at Montevideo. She then continued on to Rosario and from there sailed back to New York. Upon arrival, the vessel was chartered by the Lamport & Holt Line for one trip to Manchester. Storstad loaded general cargo, including 1,900 bales of cotton and some food supplies, including cottonseed oil, lard and bacon, and left New York on 21 April 1912. The ship arrived in Liverpool on 4 May and upon discharging her cargo, sailed back to North America to resume her iron ore and coal trade in Canada.

After the end of navigational season in December 1912, Storstad was chartered by Gans Steamship Line and sailed to Tampa Bay, loaded 3,213 tons of phosphate pebble and then sailed to Port Eads, arriving there on 20 December. The ship took on more cargo and then sailed for Antwerp arriving there on 22 January 1913. During her journey Storstad encountered some rough weather, and arrived in port with damage to her decks, including a portion of the deckload that had been washed overboard, as well as some deck equipment and covers. Her No. 5 hold was also full of water. The ship arrived in Philadelphia on 28 February with iron ore from Narvik and after unloading continued to Florida. Storstad loaded 5,600 tons of phosphate pebble on 19 March at Boca Grande, then continued to Galveston where she took on 13,097 bales of cotton and departed for Bremen on 22 March. After finishing her European charter, the ship returned to her usual Canadian trade in May 1913.

Upon fulfillment of her summer obligations, Storstad arrived at Norfolk on 20 December 1913 to load a cargo of grain bound for Italy. The vessel left on 26 December for Genoa, which she reached on 16 January 1914. On her return journey, the ship sailed via Roses and Lisbon and arrived at Philadelphia on 5 March with a cargo of cork.

Upon unloading, Storstad sailed for Norfolk where she loaded 9,700 tons of coal plus 1,100 tons in her bunkers and departed for Venice on 20 March. The vessel arrived in Italy on 10 April, and upon discharging her cargo departed for North Sydney arriving there on 12 May 1914. The vessel was chartered by the Dominion Coal Company to transport coal between North Sydney and Montreal for the duration of summer navigational season.

=== Collision with RMS Empress of Ireland ===
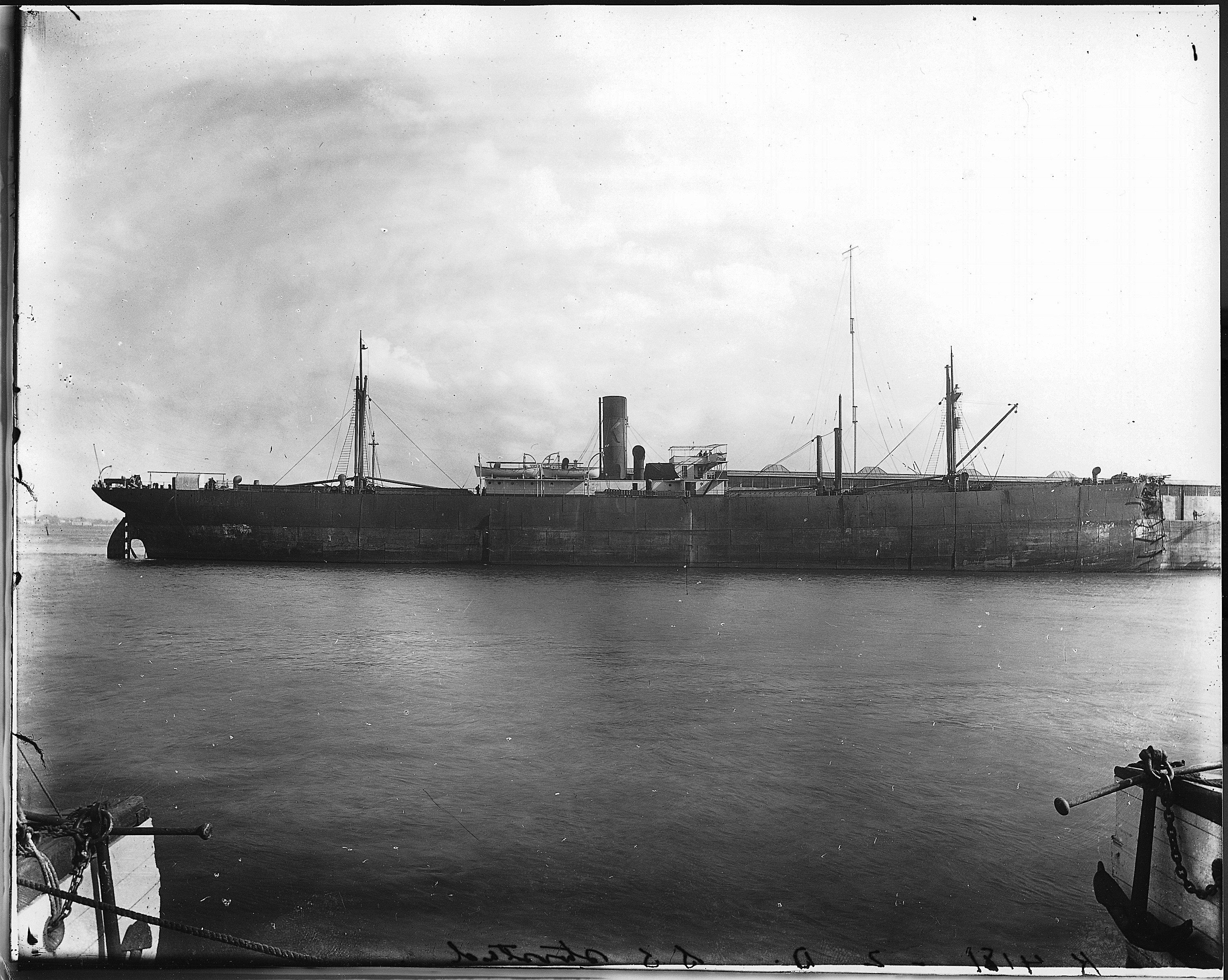
Storstad docked at Montreal after colliding with Empress of Ireland.

At 16:27 ET (21:27 UTC) on 28 May 1914, Empress of Ireland, commanded by Captain Henry Kendall, departed from Quebec City with 1,057 passengers and 420 crew members on board, bound for Liverpool. At around 01:30 (06:30 UTC) on 29 May, the liner, being just downstream of Rimouski came close to the shore to drop off her pilot near Father Point, and continued down the Saint Lawrence River. At the same time, Storstad, which had sailed from North Sydney to Quebec loaded with about 10,400 tons of coal on 26 May, was a short distance away down the river on her way to pick up the pilot. At around 01:38 a lookout on Empress of Ireland observed a ship off the starboard side about six miles east. Captain Kendall ordered to alter the course slightly in order to pass the oncoming ship starboard to starboard. As the course was changed, a thick fog bank rolled in and the liner was ordered Full Astern and three short blasts were given indicating she was reversing. Storstad, with First Officer Alfred Toftenes on duty, replied with one long whistle which appeared to be coming from the starboard side.

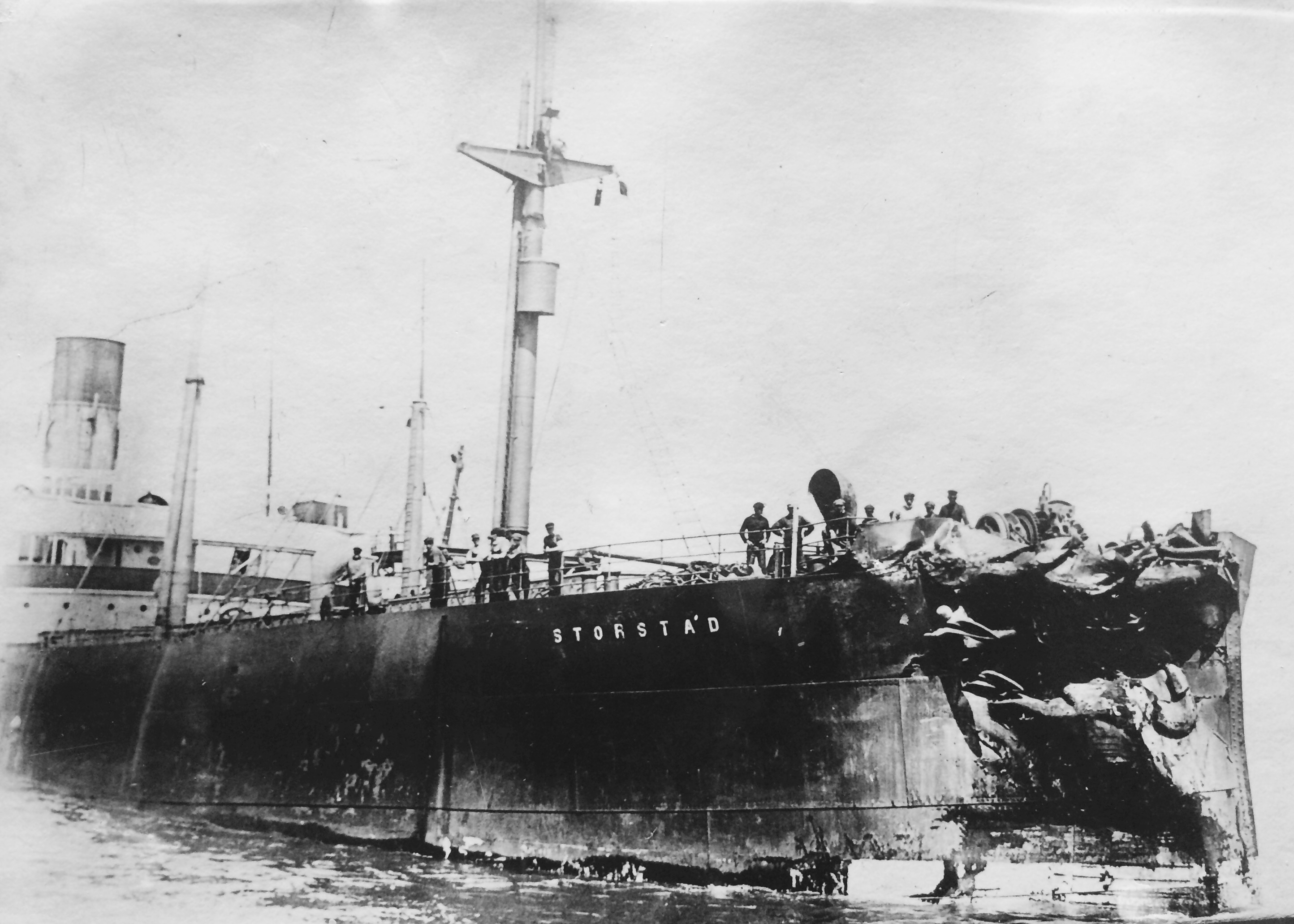
Damage sustained by Storstad in the collision.

Kendall ordered the liner's engines set to Full Stop and gave two more blasts, informing the oncoming vessel that Empress of Ireland was dead in the water; Storstad, again responded with one long blast. The watch crew on Storstad initially observed the liner's green light on their port side and assumed she would continue to hold her course and pass green-to-green. However, as the liner approached, the freighter's crew sighted the lights moving as if the oncoming ship was making a maneuver changing her course. Toftenes assumed the oncoming ship was trying to pass them red-to-red instead, and ordered a slight change of course to port and stopped the engines. Fearing the current would carry his ship into the liner's path he soon ordered the engines to be restarted. It was, however, too late, and around 01:55, Empress of Ireland's crew suddenly saw Storstad appear out of the fog, heading directly for them.

At 01:56 (06:56 UTC), the ships collided at an approximately 40° angle, with the much sturdier Storstad tearing a roughly 4.9-metre (16 ft) gash in Empress of Ireland's starboard side between her funnels. Captain Kendall, hoping to use Storstad as a plug, directed the freighter by megaphone to keep going Full Ahead, but due to her onward momentum and the strong current, Empress of Ireland kept slowly moving forward while Storstad drifted sideways and backwards, forcing the ships apart and allowing water to flood the liner at a rate of 60,000 imperial gallons (270,000 L; 72,000 US gal) per second. With no time to close the watertight doors and many of her portholes left open, Empress of Ireland capsized and sank to the riverbed in fourteen minutes, taking 1,012 people down with her.

Due to the rapidity of the sinking, only seven lifeboats were lowered from the liner. Storstad stood by and assisted the survivors, lowering her own lifeboats and pulling 485 people from the ice cold waters of the river. Twenty of them later died from hypothermia on board the freighter. Another steamship, Lady Evelyn, came by later to help with the rescue and took the survivors to Rimouski. Storstad had her bow smashed in and twisted, but managed to limp into the port of Montreal where she was detained.

The Canadian Pacific Railway (CPR), which owned Empress of Ireland, filed a $2,000,000 lawsuit for damages against A. F. Klaveness & Co, the owners of Storstad. A. F. Klaveness & Co. could not pay the $2,000,000, resulting in the Storstad herself being awarded to the CPR as recompense. The CPR sold Storstad to Prudential Trust, an insurance company acting on behalf of A. F. Klaveness & Co., for $175,000.

== Loss ==
On 8 March 1917 during World War I, Storstad was sunk in the Atlantic Ocean 45 nautical miles (83 km; 52 mi) southwest of the Fastnet Rock (51°20′N 11°50′W) by the German submarine U-62. Three crew members of Storstad were lost.
