= Musicians of the Titanic =

Musicians lost in the Titanic sinking

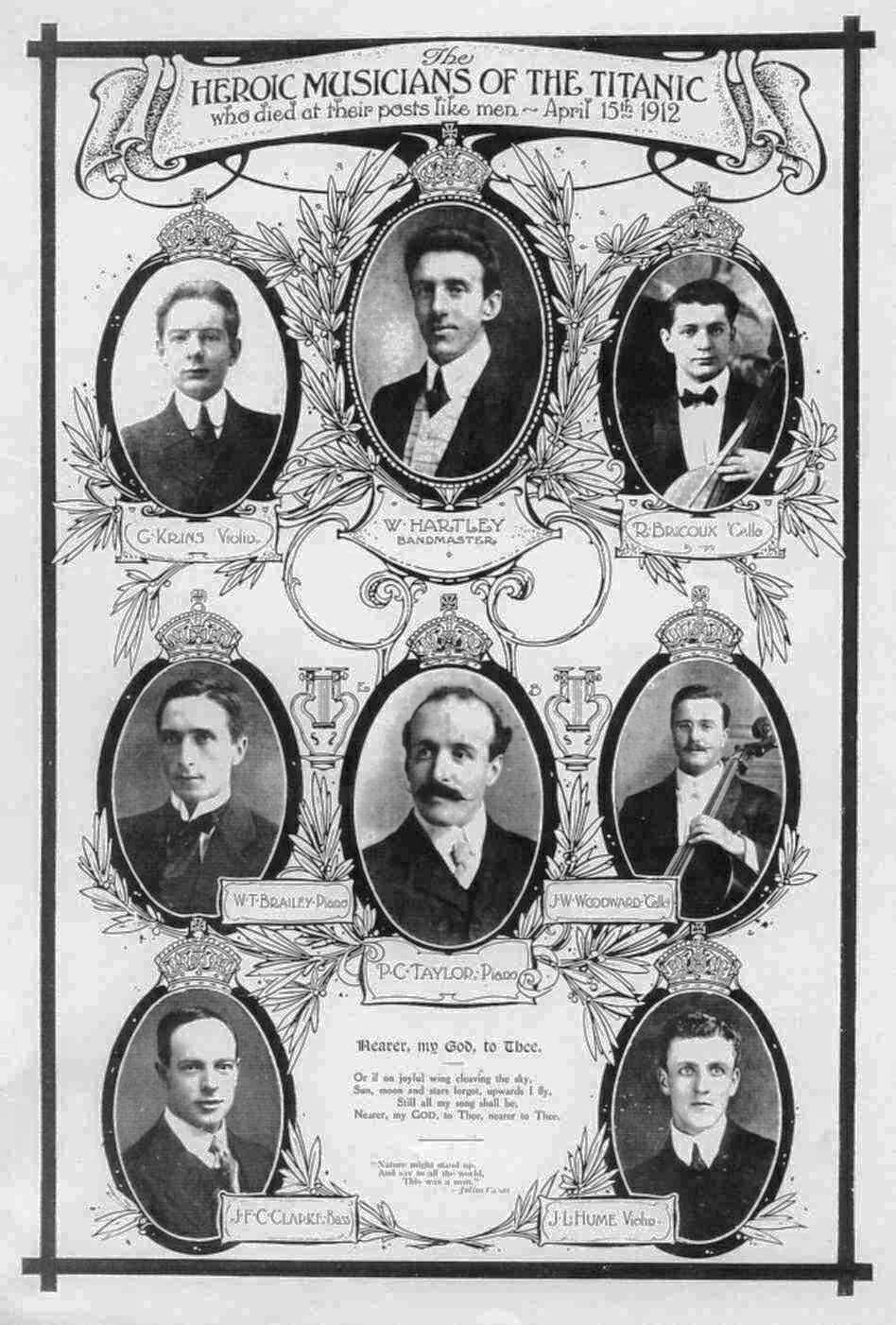
Commemorative feature about the Titanic orchestra. From left to right, top to bottom: Krins, Hartley, Bricoux, Brailey, Taylor, Woodward, Clarke, and Hume.

The musicians of the Titanic were an octet orchestra who performed chamber music in the first class section aboard the ship.

The group is notable for playing music, intending to calm the passengers for as long as they possibly could, during the ship's sinking in the early hours of 15 April 1912 in which all of the members perished.

== Overview ==
Eight musicians – members of a three-piece ensemble and a five-piece ensemble – were booked through C. W. & F. N. Black, in Liverpool. They boarded at Southampton and traveled in second-class. They were not on the White Star Line's payroll but were contracted to White Star by the Liverpool firm of C. W. & F. N. Black, which placed musicians on almost all British liners. Until the night of the sinking, the players performed as two separate groups: a quintet led by violinist and official bandleader Wallace Hartley, that played at teatime, after-dinner concerts, and Sunday services, among other occasions; and the violin, cello, and piano trio of Georges Krins, Roger Bricoux, and William Brailey, that played at the À La Carte Restaurant and the Café Parisien.

After the Titanic hit an iceberg and began to sink, Hartley and his fellow band members started playing music to help keep the passengers calm as the crew loaded the lifeboats. Many of the survivors said that Hartley and the band continued to play until the very end. Reportedly, their final tune was the hymn "Nearer, My God, to Thee", although other sources suggest it was "Songe d'Automne" (also known simply as "Autumn"). One second-class passenger said:

Many brave things were done that night, but none were more brave than those done by men playing minute after minute as the ship settled quietly lower and lower in the sea. The music they played served alike as their own immortal requiem and their right to be recalled on the scrolls of undying fame.

All eight musicians died in the sinking.

== Musicians ==
Name	Age	Hometown	Position	Body	Ref.
William Brailey	24	London, England	Pianist	–	
Roger Bricoux	20	Cosne-sur-Loire, Nièvre, France	Cellist	–	
John Clarke	28	Liverpool, Lancashire, England	Bassist	202^{MB}	
Wallace Hartley	33	Colne, Lancashire, England	Bandmaster, violinist	224^{MB}	
Jock Hume	21	Dumfries, Dumfriesshire, Scotland	Violinist	193^{MB}	
Georges Krins	23	London, England	Violinist	–	
Percy Taylor	40	London, England	Cellist	–	
John Woodward	32	Oxford, Oxfordshire, England	Cellist	–	

=== William Brailey ===
William Brailey
- Born: 25 October 1887; Walthamstow, Essex, England
- Died: 15 April 1912 (aged 24); North Atlantic Ocean
- Occupation: Pianist
- Military career
- Allegiance: United Kingdom
- Branch: British Army
- Service years: 1902–1907
- Unit: Lancashire Fusiliers

William Theodore Brailey (25 October 1887 – 15 April 1912) was an English pianist. Born on 25 October 1887 in Walthamstow in Greater London (then part of Essex), he was the son of William Richard "Ronald" Brailey, a well-known figure of Spiritualism. Brailey studied piano at school, and one of his first jobs was performing in a local hotel.

In 1902, he joined the Royal Lancashire Fusiliers regiment signing for 12 years service as a musician. He was stationed in Barbados but left the army prematurely in 1907. He returned to England and lived at 71 Lancaster Road, Ladbroke Grove, London. In 1911, he enlisted aboard ship, playing first on the Saxonia, prior to joining the Cunard steamer RMS Carpathia in 1912, where he met the French cellist Roger Bricoux. Both men then joined the White Star Line and were recruited by Liverpool music agency C. W. & F. N. Black to serve on the Titanic. Brailey boarded the Titanic on Wednesday 10 April 1912 in Southampton. His ticket number was 250654, the ticket for all the members of Hartley's orchestra. His cabin was in the second class quarters.

Brailey was 24 years old when he died; his body was never recovered.

=== Roger Bricoux ===
Roger Bricoux
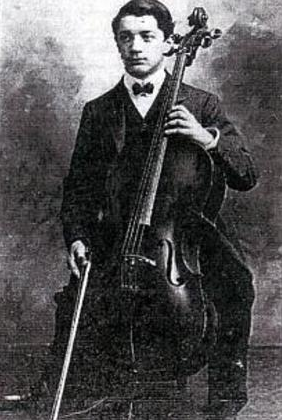
- Born: 1 June 1891; Cosne-sur-Loire, France
- Died: 15 April 1912 (aged 20); North Atlantic Ocean
- Occupation: Cellist

Roger Marie Leon Joseph Bricoux (1 June 1891 – 15 April 1912) was a French cellist. Born on 1 June 1891 in Rue de Donzy, Cosne-Cours-sur-Loire, France, Bricoux was the son of a musician.

The family moved to Monaco when he was a young boy, and he was educated in various Catholic institutions in Italy. It was during his studies that he joined his first orchestra and won first prize at the Conservatory of Bologna for musical ability. After studying at the Paris Conservatory, he moved to England in 1910 to join the orchestra in the Grand Central Hotel in Leeds. At the end of 1911, he moved to Lille, France, lived at 5 Place du Lion d'Or, and played in various locations throughout the city.

Before joining the Titanic, Bricoux had served with Brailey on the Cunard steamer Carpathia before joining the White Star Line. He boarded the Titanic on Wednesday 10 April 1912 in Southampton. His ticket number was 250654, the ticket for all the members of Hartley's orchestra. His cabin was second class, and he was the only French musician aboard the Titanic.

Bricoux was 20 years old when he died; his body was never recovered.

In 1913, after his apparent disappearance, he was declared a deserter by the French army. It was not until 2000 that he was eventually officially registered as dead in France, mainly due to the efforts of the Association Française du Titanic. On 2 November 2000, the same association unveiled a memorial plaque to Bricoux in Cosne-Cours-sur-Loire.

=== John Clarke ===
John Clarke
- Born: 28 July 1883; Manchester, Lancashire, England
- Died: 15 April 1912 (aged 28); North Atlantic Ocean
- Burial place: Mount Olivet Cemetery, Halifax, Nova Scotia
- Occupation: Bassist

John Frederick Preston Clarke (28 July 1883 – 15 April 1912) was an English bass violinist, born in Chorlton, Manchester, Lancashire. He was the son of John Robert Clarke, a law clerk from Croydon, Surrey, and Ellen Preston, a dressmaker from Yorkshire. He seemed to have come from a musical family; his aunt Mary was listed as a musician in the 1891 census.

According to the 1901 census, Clarke was living in Liverpool and listed as being an insurance clerk. By 1911, he was listed as a musician, still unmarried and living with his mother and sisters in Liverpool. By then, he was a member of the orchestra of the Argyle Theatre in Birkenhead, and had also played with the Royal Liverpool Philharmonic.

Clarke joined the Titanic as a bass violinist, travelling Second Class with the rest of the musicians. He died in the disaster. His body was recovered by the Mackay-Bennett and buried at Mount Olivet Cemetery, Halifax, on 8 May 1912.

=== Jock Hume ===
Jock Hume
- Born: 9 August 1890; Dumfries, Dumfrisshire, Scotland
- Died: 15 April 1912 (aged 21); North Atlantic Ocean
- Burial place: Fairview Lawn Cemetery, Halifax, Nova Scotia
- Occupation: Violinist
- Partner(s): Ethel McDonald (1910–1911); Mary Costin (fiancée; 1911–1912)
- Children: 2

John Law "Jock" Hume (9 August 1890 – 15 April 1912) was a Scottish violinist. Hume was born on 9 August 1890 in Dumfries, Scotland, and lived with his parents at 42 George Street, Dumfries. He had already played on at least five ships before the Titanic, and was recruited to play on its maiden voyage due to his good reputation as a musician.

Hume spent the winter of 1910/1911 in Kingston, Jamaica, where he performed in the Orchestra for the Constant Spring Hotel, a grand resort of the time. Future Titanic cellist John Woodward was also a member of the Constant Spring Orchestra. During his four months in Jamaica, Hume entered a relationship with barmaid Ethel McDonald. Hume left Jamaica in April 1911, and Ethel gave birth to their child, Keith Neville McDonald Hume, in November 1911.

He boarded the Titanic on Wednesday, 10 April 1912, in Southampton. His ticket number was 250654, the ticket for all the members of Hartley's orchestra. His cabin was in the second class quarters.

Hume was 21 years old when he died and his fiancée, Mary Costin, was pregnant with his child, a daughter named Johnann Hume Costin. His body was recovered by the CS Mackay-Bennett, and was passed into the care of John Henry Barnstead who arranged for his burial in grave 193 of the designated Titanic plot at Fairview Lawn Cemetery, Halifax, Nova Scotia, Canada, on 8 May 1912. A memorial was erected for Hume and Thomas Mullin (third class steward) in Dock Park, Dumfries.

Hume and the other members of Hartley's orchestra all belonged to the Amalgamated British Musicians Union and were employed by a Liverpool music agency, C. W. & F. N. Black, which supplied musicians for Cunard and the White Star Line. On 30 April 1912, Hume's father, Andrew, received the following note from the agency:

Dear Sir:

We shall be obliged if you will remit us the sum of 5s. 4d. [five shillings and sixpence], which is owing to us as per enclosed statement.

We shall also be obliged if you will settle the enclosed uniform account.

Yours faithfully,

C. W. & F. N. Black

The letter caused controversy at the time when it was reprinted in the Amalgamated Musicians Union's monthly newsletter. Andrew Law Hume decided not to settle the bill.

In April 1914, John W. Furness, the violinist of the Canadian liner RMS Empress of Ireland, made a pilgrimage with Anglican Church officials to visit the grave of John Law Hume at the Fairview Lawn Cemetery and pay his respects. Furness himself died few weeks later when Empress of Ireland sank on 29 May 1914.

=== Georges Krins ===
Georges Krins
- Born: 18 March 1889; Paris, France
- Died: 15 April 1912 (aged 23); North Atlantic Ocean
- Occupation: Violinist

Georges Alexandre Krins (18 March 1889 – 15 April 1912) was a Belgian violinist. Born on 18 March 1889 in Paris, France, his family was from Belgium, and soon after his birth they moved back there to the town of Spa. He first studied at Academie de Musique de Spa. He then moved to the Conservatoire Royal de Musique in Liège, Belgium, where he studied from 30 October 1902 until 1908, when he won first prize for violin, with the highest distinction.

As a young man he wanted to join the army; however, his parents persuaded him otherwise. He worked in his father's shop and played in La Grande Symphonie, Spa, and in 1910 he moved to Paris to be first violin at Le Trianon Lyrique. He subsequently moved to London and played for two years at the Ritz Hotel until March 1912. He lived at 10 Villa Road, Brixton, London, and became bandmaster of the Trio String Orchestra, which played near the Café Français. This led to his being recruited by CW & FN Black, Liverpool to play on the Titanic.

He boarded the Titanic on Wednesday 10 April 1912 in Southampton. His ticket number was 250654, the ticket for all the members of Hartley's orchestra. His cabin was second class, and he was the only Belgian musician aboard the Titanic. After the Titanic began to sink, Krins and his fellow band members assembled in the first class lounge and started playing music to help keep the passengers calm. They later moved to the forward half of the boat deck, where they continued to play as the crew loaded the lifeboats. Krins was 23 years old when he died. His body was never recovered.

=== Percy Taylor ===
Percy Taylor
- Born: 20 March 1872; Hackney, London, England
- Died: 15 April 1912 (aged 40); North Atlantic Ocean
- Occupation: Pianist
- Spouse: Clara Alice Talbot (m. 1906)

Percy Cornelius Taylor (20 March 1872 – 15 April 1912) was an English pianist, born in Hackney, London, though he spent most of his life living south of the River Thames, in Peckham. He was the son of Martin Taylor and Emily Wheeler. His father was a printer and compositor who came from Yorkshire while his mother was born in London.

Taylor married Clara Alice Davis (née Talbot), a music hall artist under the name Clarissa Talbot, on 20 May 1906 in Christ Church, Lambeth. He gave his occupation at the time as an accountant. This was her second marriage, her first husband having died two years after they married. It is likely the couple became estranged by 1911 as she was back living with her parents while his whereabouts were not known.

It is unclear when Taylor began his career as a musician but there are records of a pianist named "Percy C. Taylor" as early as 1894. Titanic was likely his first ship that he ever performed on. In the early stages of the sinking, there is some evidence which suggests that the band played near the top of the forward grand staircase were there was a piano, before moving outside; even in this scenario, only one pianist would have been needed. It is likely that Taylor and the other pianist, Brailey, participated on other instruments.

Taylor died in the sinking. His body, if recovered at all, was never identified.

=== John Woodward ===
John Woodward
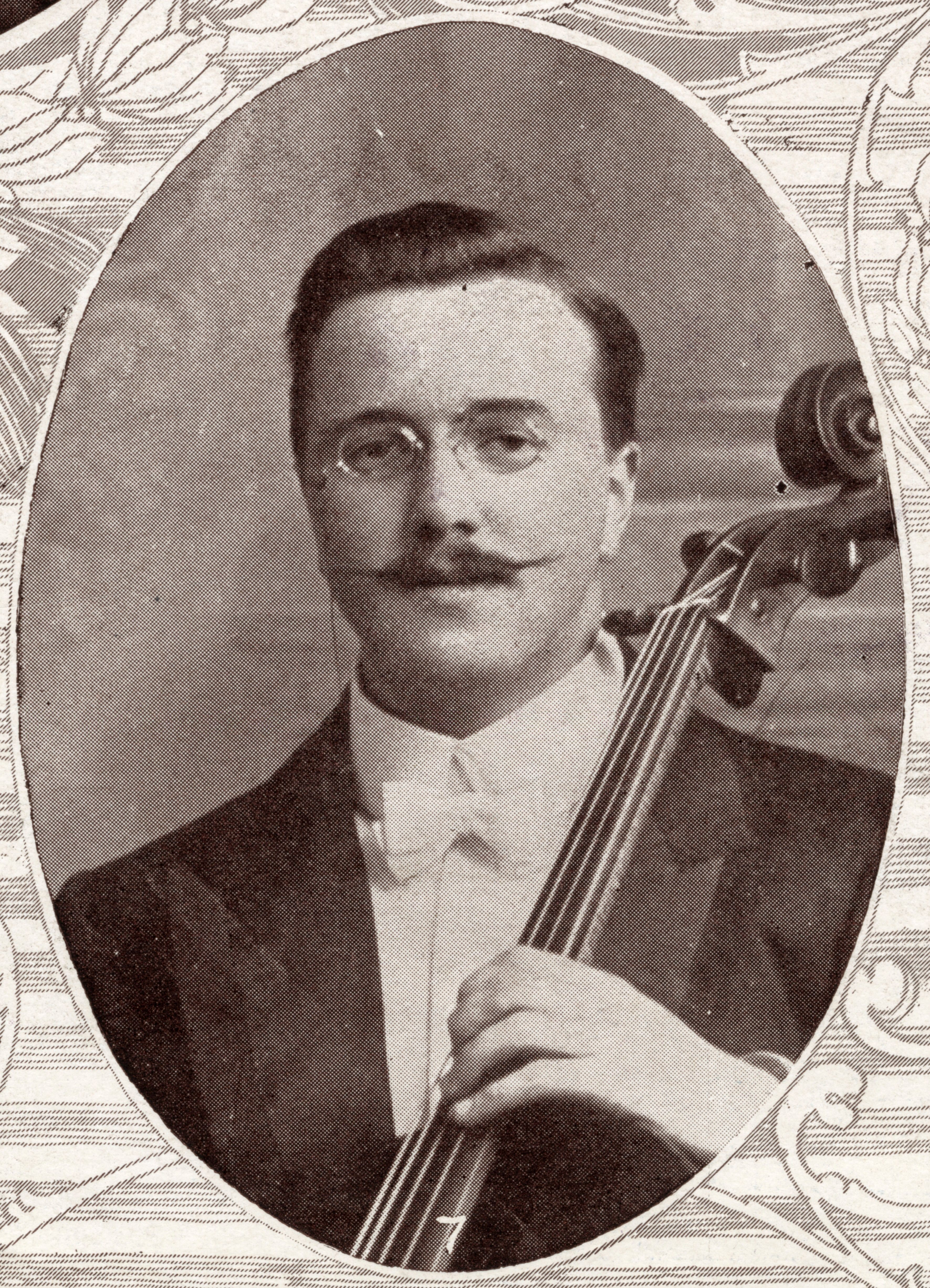
- Born: 11 September 1879; West Bromwich, Staffordshire, England
- Died: 15 April 1912 (aged 32); North Atlantic Ocean
- Occupation: Cellist

John Wesley Woodward (11 September 1879 – 15 April 1912) was an English cellist. Born in West Bromwich on 11 September 1879, he was the youngest of ten children born to Joseph and Martha Woodward.

He became a professional musician, playing in Oxford, and Eastbourne. In Eastbourne, he played the cello both at the Grand Hotel and in the local orchestra. While in Eastbourne he joined the White Star Line musicians, playing on transatlantic ships.

On 10 April 1912, he boarded the Titanic at Southampton for her maiden Transatlantic voyage. Five days later, on 15 April 1912, the ship hit an iceberg and he and the other musicians famously continued to play as the Titanic sank. Woodward died in the sinking and his body likely was never recovered.

A memorial plaque was erected to Woodward on the promenade in Eastbourne depicting the Titanic as it sank. He is also commemorated on his family gravestone at Heath Lane Cemetery, in West Bromwich.

== Memorial concert ==
A memorial concert for the Bandsmen of the Titanic was held at the Royal Albert Hall on 24 May 1912, a month after the sinking, to raise funds to support the families of the musicians lost at sea. Musicians from the London Philharmonic Orchestra, the Queen's Hall Orchestra, the London Symphony Orchestra, the New Symphony Orchestra, the Beecham Symphony Orchestra, the Royal Opera Orchestra, and the London Opera House Orchestra made up an orchestra of around 500 players. Ada Crossley opened the concert with Felix Mendelssohn's Oh Rest in the Lord from Elijah, with the rest of the programme consisting of solemn orchestral items including works by Elgar, Tchaikovsky and Wagner, with Chopin's Funeral March and Arthur Sullivan's "In Memoriam". Seven conductors led the orchestra, Sir Edward Elgar, Sir Henry Wood, Landon Ronald, Percy Pitt, Thomas Beecham, Fritz Ernaldy and Willem Mengelberg. The audience joined in singing "Nearer, My God, to Thee" as orchestrated by Sir Henry Wood to close the concert. A photograph of the event hangs in the Royal Albert Hall outside the loggia boxes.

== Memorials ==
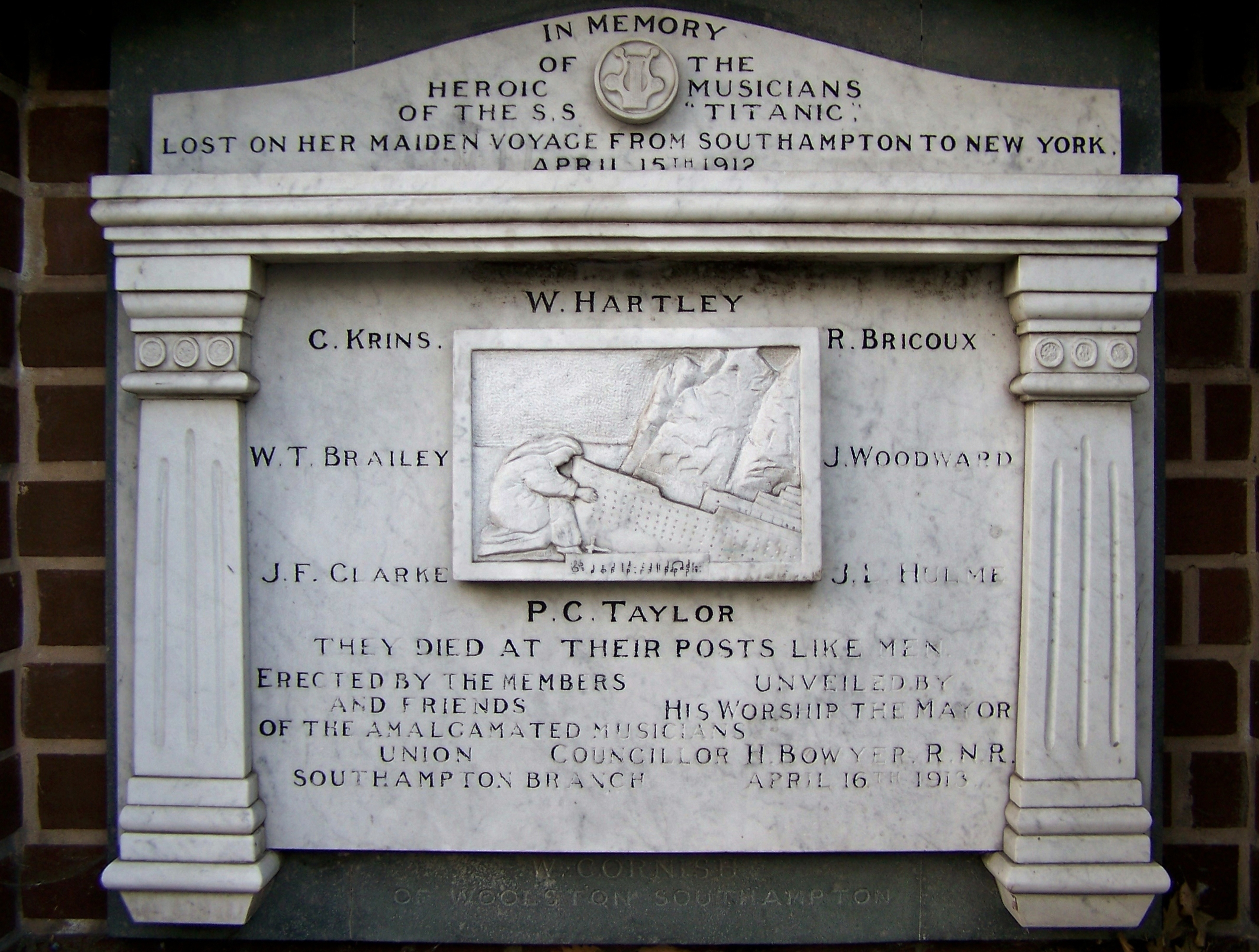
RMS Titanic Musician's Memorial, Southampton

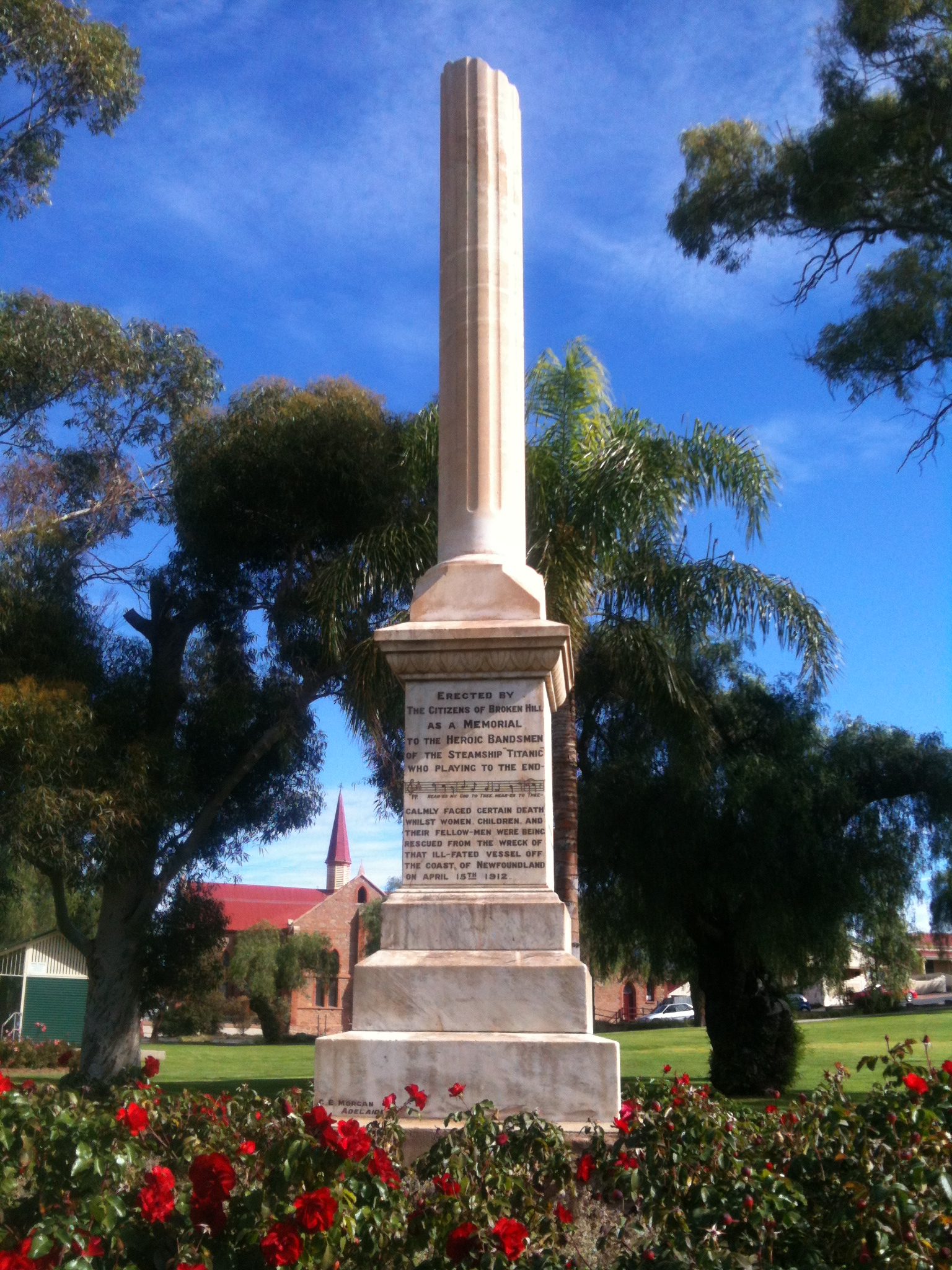
Titanic Bandsmen Memorial monument in Broken Hill, Australia (1913)

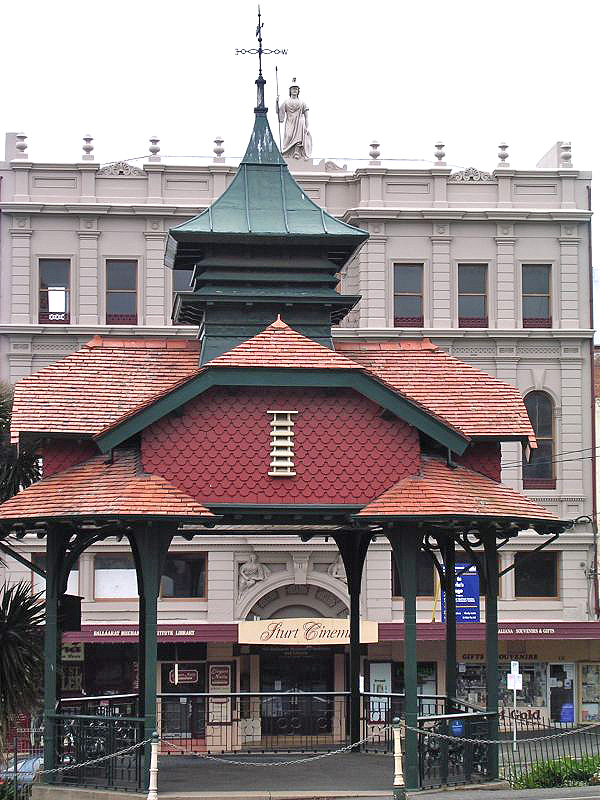
SS Titanic Memorial Bandstand in Ballarat, Australia (1915)

== In media ==
=== Film ===
Two documentary films have been made about the Titanic's band.

- The British film, Titanic: The Band Played On (completed in 2012), was shown on Yesterday television.
- The American Film, Titanic–Band of Courage (2014), was shown on Public Broadcasting System stations.

=== Literature ===
Books written specifically about the Titanic's musicians include:

- Steve Turner's nonfiction book, The Band that Played On: The Extraordinary Story of the 8 Musicians Who Went Down with the Titanic (2011)
- Christopher Ward's non-fiction book, And the Band Played On: The Titanic Violinist and the Glovemaker: A True Story of Love, Loss and Betrayal (2011), which became a Sunday Times bestseller and was made into a documentary for the Discovery Channel titled, Titanic: The Aftermath (2012). The book details the story of Ward's grandfather, Jock Hume.

=== Music ===
- Chamber music ensemble I Salonisti performs Titanic repertoire on the album And the Band Played On (Music Played on the Titanic) (1997), including the Intermezzo from Cavalleria rusticana. The White Star orchestra played this famous piece from Mascagni's opera after dinner in Titanic's lounge on 10 April 1912, according to passenger Father Browne.
- Minimalist work The Sinking of the Titanic (1969–1972) by composer Gavin Bryars is meant to recreate how the music performed by the band would reverberate through the water some time after they ceased performing.
- Harry Chapin's album Dance Band on the Titanic (1977) is dedicated to the Titanic's ensembles and contains a song titled "Dance Band on the Titanic"
- The album Titanic: Music As Heard on the Fateful Voyage (1997), by Ian Whitcomb and the White Star Orchestra, recreates songs played aboard the Titanic the night the ship foundered, and includes detailed liner notes about the music and excursion.

=== Theatre ===
- The 1997 musical Titanic, with music and lyrics by Maury Yeston and a book by Peter Stone that opened on Broadway, is set on the ocean liner. It swept the 1997 musical Tony Awards winning all five it was nominated for including the award for Best Musical and Best Score (Yeston's second for both). It ran for 804 performances at the Lunt-Fontanne Theatre. Hartley is the only named character in the musical, while the rest of the band itself only makes an appearance in one music number.

== See also ==
- Crew of the Titanic
- Four Chaplains – American military chaplains lost on the SS Dorchester during World War II

Sources

- Turner, Steve (22 March 2011). The Band that Played On: The Extraordinary Story of the 8 Musicians Who Went Down with the Titanic. Thomas Nelson Inc. ISBN 9781595552198 – via Internet Archive.
