= Barnstead =

Barnstead may refer to:

- Barnstead, New Hampshire, an American town
- William A. Barnstead (1919–2009), an American businessman and politician
- John Henry Barnstead, coroner after the sinking of the Titanic

== See also ==
- Banstead
