= Patrick Coleman =

Patrick Coleman may refer to:

- Les Coleman (politician) (Patrick Leslie Coleman, 1895–1974), Australian politician
- Vince Coleman (train dispatcher) (Patrick Vincent Coleman, 1872–1917), Canadian train dispatcher
