= Richard Donat =

Canadian actor (1941–2026)

- Born: June 1, 1941; Kentville, Nova Scotia, Canada
- Died: March 28, 2026 (aged 84); Bridgewater, Nova Scotia, Canada
- Family: Peter Donat (brother)

Richard Francois Donat (June 1, 1941 – March 28, 2026) was a Canadian actor, known for his work in Canadian and American television. He is well known for playing the character Vince Teagues in the Canadian–American television series, Haven. Donat was the younger brother of Peter Donat and the nephew of British actor Robert Donat.

== Life and career ==
Donat had a long career playing character roles mainly on television, though he had roles in films such as Tomorrow Never Comes (1978), City on Fire (1979), Gas (1981), Draw! (1984), My American Cousin (1985), Samuel Lount (1985), American Boyfriends (1989), The Weight of Water (2000), The Event (2003) and Amelia (2009). He also narrated several documentaries, including a number of Nova episodes.

Among his television appearances, Donat was Doctor Burnley in the Canadian series Emily of New Moon from 1998 to 2000. He played Colonel Boyle, the fort commander in the Canadian comedy series Blackfly for its two seasons, 2001–2002. Between 2010 and 2015 he played Vince Teagues, one of the editors of the local newspaper in the town of Haven from the TV series of the same name. Although Haven is supposed to be in Maine, the series is filmed in Nova Scotia where Donat hails from.

In 1984, Donat won a Dora Mavor Moore Award for "Outstanding Performance by a Male in a Leading Role" for his work in Brecht's In the Jungle of Cities. In 2007, he won a Merritt Award for "Outstanding Performance – Supporting Actor" for his role in Sam Shepard's Fool For Love.

He was also a director and won the Mecca Award in 2004 for his direction of The Drawer Boy.

Donat died on March 28, 2026, at the age of 84.

== Filmography ==
=== Film ===
Year	Title	Role	Notes
1976	Death Weekend	Policeman	
1978	Tomorrow Never Comes	Ray	
1979	City on Fire	Captain Harrison Risley	
1981	Gas	Fred	
1985	Martin's Day	Senior Policeman	
1985	My American Cousin	Major Wilcox	
1985	Samuel Lount	Sheriff Jarvis	
1987	Deep Sea Conspiracy	Micradyne man	
1989	American Boyfriends	Major Wilcox	
2000	The Weight of Water	Mr. Plaisted	
2002	Phase IV	Karl Dean	
2002	Dragonwheel	Reverend Matherson	
2003	The Event	Undertaker	
2006	The Conclave	Cardinal Pietro Barbo	
2009	Amelia	Gallagher	
2014	Lure	Marshall Spencer	
2016	The Healer	Larry	

=== Television ===
Year	Title	Role	Notes
1971	Dr. Simon Locke	Lamont	Episode: "The Importer"
1977	For the Record	Dan	Episode: "Hank"
1979	The Newcomers	—N/a	Episode: "1911"
1979	Little House on the Prairie	Joe Dortmunder	Episode: "The Angry Heart"
1979, 1983	The Littlest Hobo	Charlie / Mac Devlin	3 episodes
1980	The Great Detective	Isaac Treadwell	Episode: "The Eye of Clarkie Blackburn"
1982	Nurse	Stan Geddis	Episode: "Euthanasia"
1984	ABC Weekend Special	Reuben Bright	Episode: "Cougar!"
1984	Draw!	Sheriff Harmon	Television film
1985	Ewoks	Deej	13 episodes
1985	The Suicide Murders	Vern Harrington	Television film
1985, 1987	Seeing Things	Barry Cade / Luke	2 episodes
1986	The Edison Twins	Dr. Betterman	Episode: "Heavy Sweat"
1986	Philip Marlowe, Private Eye	Waxnose	Episode: "Trouble Is My Business"
1986	Adderly	—N/a	Episode: "Capture the Flag"
1987	Wiseguy	Sheriff	Episode: "No One Gets Out of Here Alive"
1988	T. and T.	Benny	Episode: "Sophie a La Modem"
1988, 1990	Danger Bay	Hunter / Hugh Carver	2 episodes
1989	The Campbells	Jack Spragget	Episode: "Something's Rotten"
1990	The Little Kidnappers	Hans Hooft	Television film
1991	Deadly Betrayal: The Bruce Curtis Story	Jim Curtis	Television film
1992	The Secret	Shane	Television film
1993	Life with Billy	Constable Snow	Television film
1994	Mary Silliman's War	Selleck Silliman	Television film
1995	Side Effects	Dr. Duchene	Episode: "Snap, Crackle, Pop!"
1995	Net Worth	Jimmy Norris	Television film
1996	Dangerous Offender: The Marlene Moore Story	Robert Harris	Television film
1996	Calm at Sunset	Gil	Television film
1996–1997	Lexx	Megashadow Admiral	4 episodes
1997	Psi Factor	Cole Conacher	Episode: "The Greenhouse Effect/The Buzz"
1997	Pit Pony: A Diamond in The Rough	Rory MacLean	Television film
1997	Major Crime	Sgt. Hulce	Television film
1997	Promise the Moon	Wilbur Bennett	Television film
1997–2000	Wind at My Back	Eugene MacFarlane	3 episodes
1998	Oceans of Mystery	Narrator	Episode: "Slaver, Warrior or Privateer?"
1998–2000	Emily of New Moon	Dr. Burnley	28 episodes
1999	Blue Moon	Justice of the Peace	Television film
1999	Made in Canada	—N/a	Episode: "The Christmas Show"
2000	Our Daily Bread	Father McGregor	Television film
2001	Passion and Prejudice	Dist. Atty. Bridges	Television film
2001	Sunk on Christmas Eve	Narrator	Television film
2001–2002	Blackfly	Col. Boyle / Earl of Pickersaill	26 episodes
2002	Trudeau	MacDonald	Television film
2002	The Pilot's Wife	Father Paul	Television film
2002	Heart of a Stranger	Phillip	Television film
2003	Martha, Inc.: The Story of Martha Stewart	Kmart Exec	Television film
2003	Shattered City: The Halifax Explosion	Patrick Collins	2 episodes
2004	Sleep Murder	Judge Walter	Television film
2004–2009	Nova	Narrator / Dr. Robert Darwin	5 episodes
2005	Suzanne's Diary for Nicholas	Earl	Television film
2005	Trudeau II: Maverick in the Making	Monseigneur Desranleau	Television film
2006	Candles on Bay Street	Walter	Television film
2007, 2018	Trailer Park Boys	Big Hawk / Judge	3 episodes
2009	Sea Wolf	Clerk #1	2 episodes
2010–2015	Haven	Vince Teagues	61 episodes
2011	Moby Dick	Inn Landlord	Television film
2012	Titanic: The Aftermath	John Henry Barnstead	Television film
2013	Republic of Doyle	James Bennett	2 episodes
2013	Rookie Blue	Graham Ward	Episode: "For Better, for Worse"
2015	Hemlock Grove	McDougal	2 episodes
2016	Mr. D	Narrator	Episode: "Gerry Goes to Prison"
2020	Trailer Park Boys: The Animated Series	Big Hawk / Clown	2 episodes
2023	Sullivan's Crossing	Roy	6 episodes
