= Fairview Lawn Cemetery =

Cemetery in Halifax, Nova Scotia, Canada

Fairview Cemetery
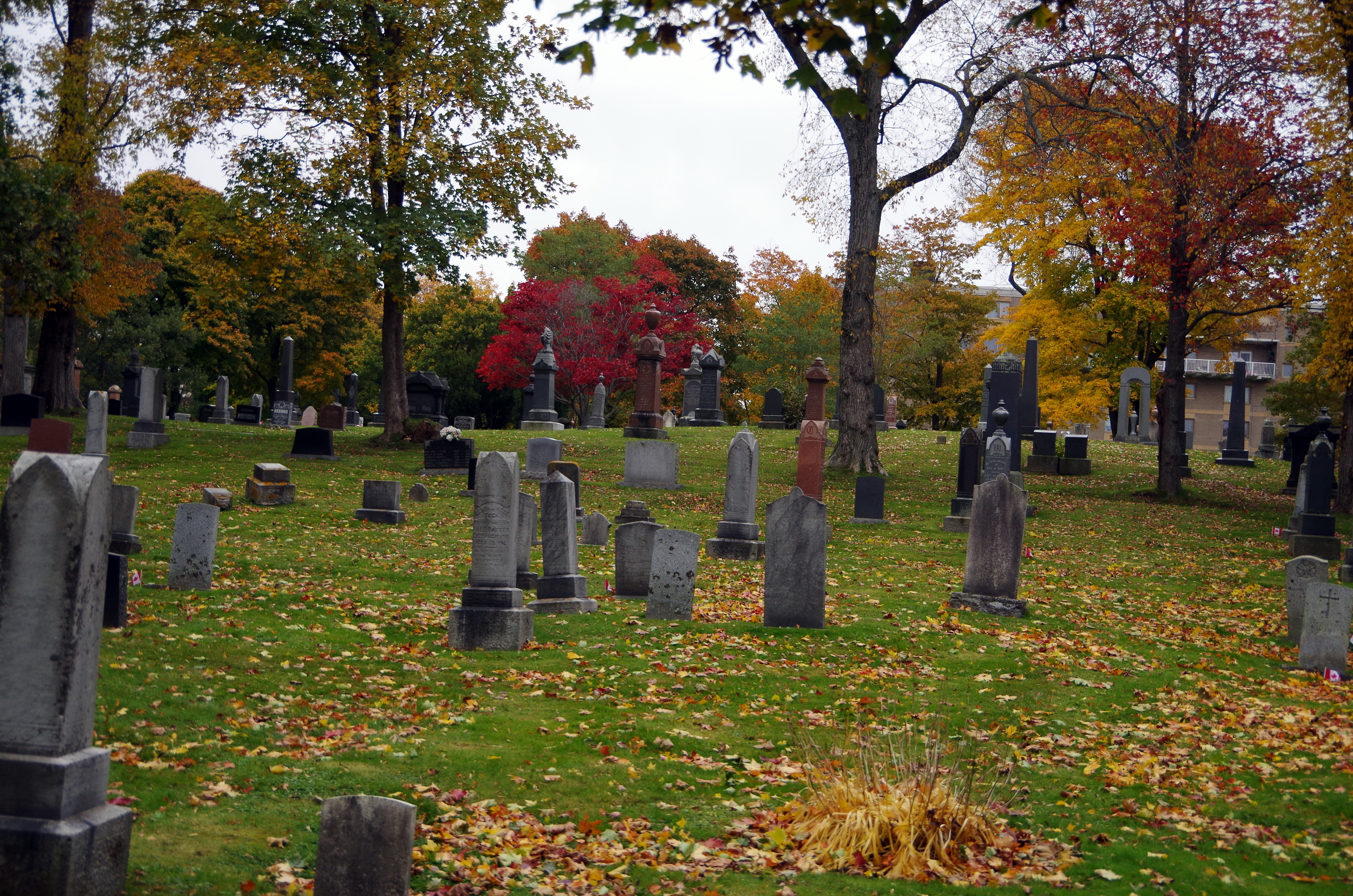
- The cemetery in November 2015
- Interactive map of Fairview Cemetery

Details
- Established: 1893
- Location: North End, Halifax
- Country: Canada
- Coordinates: 44.661°N 63.622°W
- Type: Public
- Size: ?
- No. of graves: ?

Fairview Cemetery is a cemetery in Halifax, Nova Scotia, Canada. It is perhaps best known as the final resting place for over 121 victims of the sinking of the Titanic. Officially known as Fairview Lawn Cemetery, the non-denominational cemetery is run by the Parks Department of the Halifax Regional Municipality.

== Location ==
Fairview Lawn Cemetery is located in the North End of Halifax at the Northern End of Windsor Street. It is bordered by the Saint John Anglican cemetery on one side and the Baron de Hirsch Cemetery on another.

== History ==
A blockhouse was built at the site in the 1750s to protect Halifax from attacks by the Mi'kmaq people. The land was subsequently developed as small farms. In 1893, the land was acquired by a private company, the Fairview Lawn Cemetery Limited, for a non-denominational cemetery because the Camp Hill Cemetery in the centre of the city was running out of room. The city of Halifax took over the cemetery in 1944. Fairview contains a cross section of Halifax's 20th century residents including a Greek section and a Chinese section as well as a mass grave of victims from the Halifax Explosion and many other graves.

== Titanic victims ==
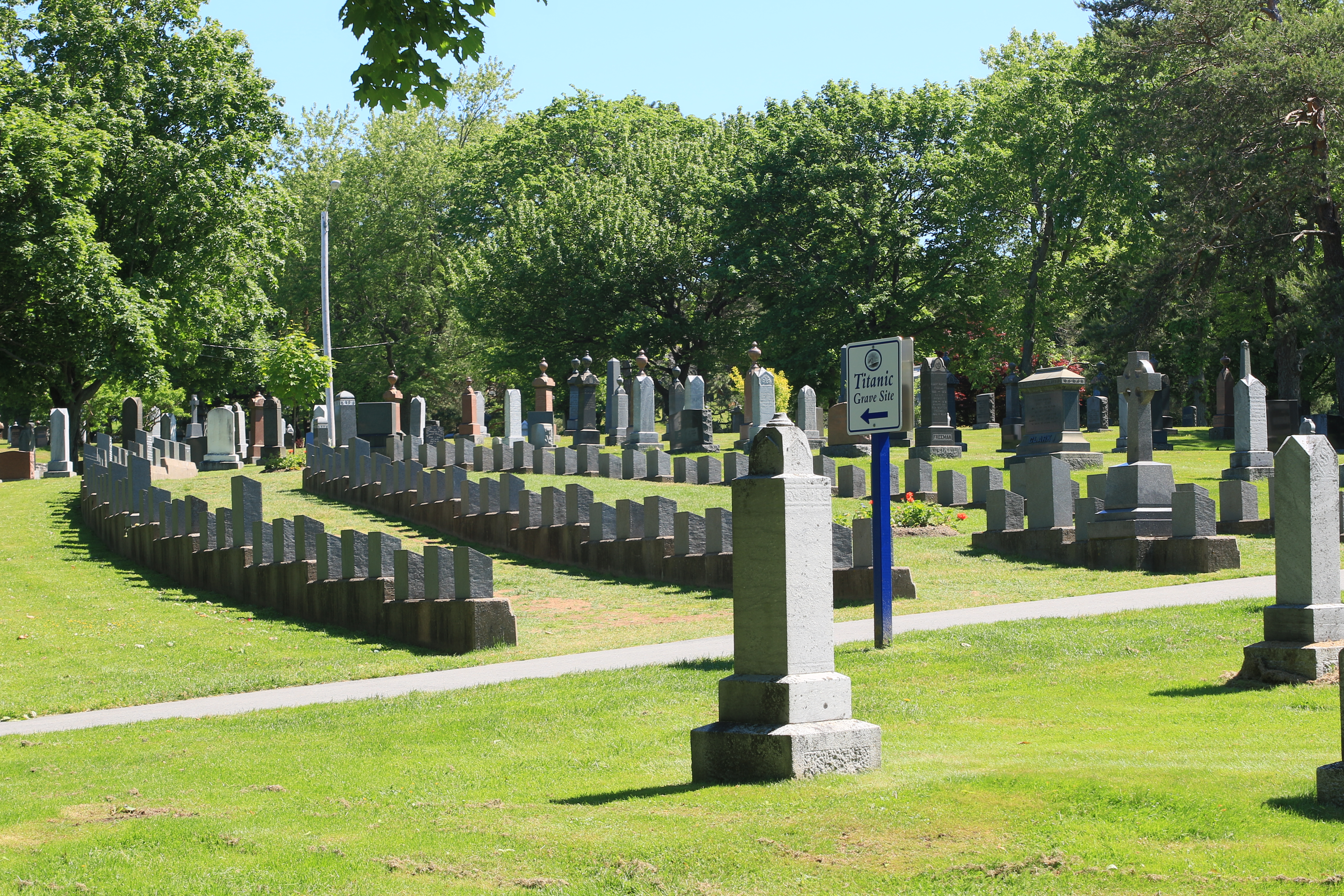
Titanic victims section

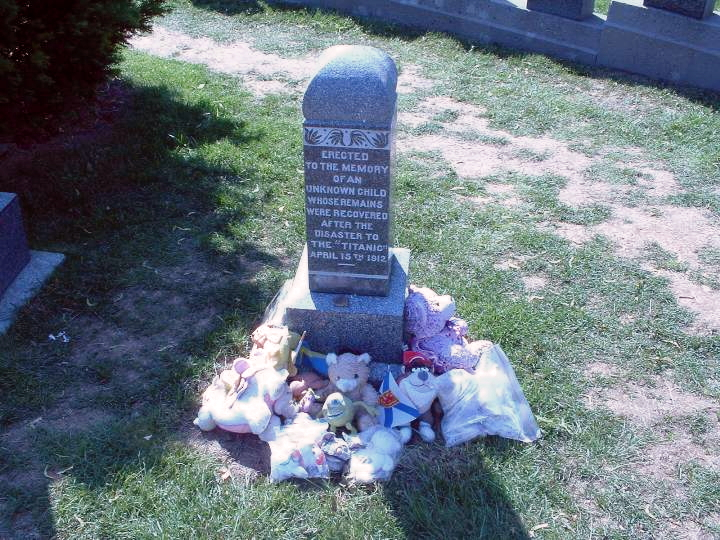
Marker of Unknown Child; positively identified as Sidney Goodwin

Fairview was selected by city coroner/registrar John Henry Barnstead as the site where the Titanic victims should be buried.

121 victims of the RMS Titanic sinking are interred at Fairview, more than any other cemetery in the world. Most of them are memorialized with small gray granite markers with the name and date of death. Some families paid for larger markers with more inscriptions. The occupants of a third of the graves, however, have never been identified and their markers contain just the date of death and marker number. Surveyor E. W. Christie laid out three long lines of graves in gentle curves following the contours of the sloping site. By co-incidence, the curved shape suggests the outline of the bow of a ship. A complete listing of those victims buried in Fairview can be found here.

One of the better-known Titanic markers is for an unidentified child victim, known for decades as The Unknown Child. No one claimed the body, so he was buried with funds provided by sailors of CS Mackay-Bennett, the cable ship that recovered his body. The marker bears the inscription 'Erected to the memory of an unknown child whose remains were recovered after the disaster of the "Titanic" April 15, 1912'. In November 2002, the child was initially identified as 13-month-old Eino Viljami Panula of Finland. Eino, his mother, and four brothers all died in the Titanic disaster. After additional forensic testing, the unknown child was re-identified as 19-month-old Sidney Leslie Goodwin, an English child who perished with his entire family.

A grave marked "J. Dawson" gained fame following the release of the 1997 film Titanic, since the name of Leonardo DiCaprio's character in the film is Jack Dawson. Many filmgoers, moved by the story, left flowers and ticket stubs at Dawson's grave when the film was first released, and flowers continue to be left today. Film director James Cameron has said the character's name was not in fact inspired by the grave. More recent research has revealed that the grave actually belongs to Joseph Dawson, an Irishman who worked in Titanic's boiler room as a coal trimmer.

Six of the previously unknown Titanic victims were identified in 1991 with the help of the Titanic International Society. Newly inscribed headstones bearing their names were unveiled on September 23, 1991, at ceremonies attended by then-Halifax Mayor Ronald Wallace, Titanic survivor Louise Pope, and more than 50 members of the Society.

29 other Titanic victims are buried elsewhere in Halifax: 19 in the Roman Catholic Mount Olivet Cemetery and 10 in the Jewish Baron de Hirsch Cemetery.

== War Graves ==
The cemetery also contains 29 war graves of Commonwealth service personnel, 20 from World War I and 9 from World War II.
