= John Henry Barnstead =

Canadian tanner and barrister

John Henry Barnstead (June 12, 1845 – June 13, 1939) was a Canadian tanner, barrister and the Registrar of Vital Statistics in Halifax, Nova Scotia, Canada. In 1912, at age 67, Barnstead coordinated the retrieval, cataloguing, and burial of RMS Titanic victims, devising a system of cataloguing mass disaster remains that is still in use.

== Life and family ==
A lifelong resident of Halifax, Nova Scotia, John Henry Barnstead was born on June 12, 1845. The son of prominent Halifax merchant Charles G. Barnstead and Agnes Meek, he was married to Harriet Tupper Creelman (1847–1941) in 1872.

Two of Barnstead's children, Dalhousie University graduates Arthur Stanley Barnstead (1873–1967) and Winifred Glen Barnstead (1884–1974) were also notable. Arthur was Deputy Provincial Secretary and Clerk of the Executive Council of Nova Scotia, and used his father's method in the aftermath of the Halifax Explosion. While Barnstead's daughter Winifred graduated from Princeton University, and was a tenured professor and the founding director of the University of Toronto Library School.

== Career ==
Despite popular culture references after his death, there is little evidence that Barnstead obtained an advanced degree, particularly none in medicine, or ever had the title coroner. He was not a doctor. He was, instead, a tanner – accustomed to death from an early age – turned barrister in his middle age, advertised as a Justice of the Peace, and over time became appointed as the province's registrar of vital statistics – the position which provided his notability.

=== Tanner ===
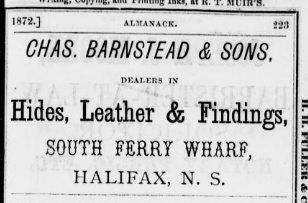
An ad for Charles Barnstead and Sons, Dealers of Hides, Leather & Findings, South Ferry Wharf, Halifax, Nova Scotia, 1872

Working with leather was the Barnstead family's trade. John Henry's grandfather, George Barnstead, was a cordwainer (shoemaker) and Vice President of the Nova Scotia Cordwainers Benevolent Society. Barnstead's namesake, his great grandfather John Henry, was also a shoemaker.

Barnstead's father Charles was a successful leather merchant, whose holdings included a tannery. The tannery occupied much of what is now bordered by Spring Garden Road, Cathedral Lane, and College Street in Halifax. Additionally, Charles Barnstead operated a leather goods store at the South Ferry Wharf.

John Henry Barnstead first appears in Halifax City Directories in 1866, at age 19, listed as a "bookkeeper" at his father's address on Spring Garden Road. He remains listed as a bookkeeper until 1870, when he appears along with his brother and father listed as "Barnstead & Sons, leather manufacturers" at Steamboat Wharf. The "s" in sons did not last, and in McAlpine's Halifax City Directory, 1874, Barnstead was listed separately from his father and older brother Charles. They were noted as "Charles Barnstead and Son, Tanners", while Barnstead was listed as "Barnstead, John H, leather, &c" Despite this, Barnstead remained in the leather business, noted as "tanners & curriers", and also as a "leather dealer" until at least 1884,

By 1889, the Barnstead tannery operations were gone from Spring Garden Road, although parcels were still in the family's possession.

=== Justice of the Peace ===
At what point Barnstead entered his career as barrister or registrar is unclear, but his retirement party in 1932 indicates it was in 1890, at age 45.

=== Halifax Fire, 1912 ===
On January 12, 1912 at 12:45am, a catastrophic fire destroyed 12 buildings along Barrington, George, and Granville Streets, including Barnstead's marriage license office at 98 Granville Street, and his brother William Lithgrow Barnstead's retail store, "Barnstead's & Sutherland's" dry goods on Barrington Street.

=== RMS Titanic ===
In April 1912, Halifax was the closest city to the sinking of the Titanic. As registrar, Barnstead was charged with documenting remains. Working with the White Star Line and rescue vessels, CS Mackay-Bennett, CS Minia, CGS Montmagny, and SS Algerine, Barnstead coordinated body identification operations, including local burial for 121 at Fairview Lawn Cemetery, 19 at Mount Olivet Cemetery and 10 at Baron de Hirsch Cemetery. The large number of bodies would normally require a mass grave, but Fairview Lawn's size allowed for burial in one zone, with one plot per body. An additional 119 bodies were documented but buried at sea. 59 bodies were shipped to their relatives.

As bodies arrived in Halifax, they were transported to the Mayflower Curling Club.

As registrar, Barnstead wrote the death certificate for each victim. Despite his noted meticulousness, he wrote "accidental drowning, RMS Titanic" on all certificates, although many deaths were as a result of exposure on the open ocean. When a body was unable to be immediately identified though personal effects, Barnstead arranged photos showing their face to aid future identification.

=== The Halifax Explosion ===
On December 7, 1917, in the aftermath of the Halifax Explosion the day before, Barnstead's son, Arthur, was appointed Chief Mortuary Officer by Deputy Mayor Henry Stubbs Colwell and District 2 Alderman Robert B. Colwell. in the aftermath of the Halifax Explosion where he organized application of his father's system.

Barnstead retired from office on January 30, 1932, at age 87, celebrating 42 years as registrar during an event held by the Minister of Health. Barnstead died the day after his 94th birthday, on June 13, 1939, and was buried in Camp Hill Cemetery, Halifax, on June 16, 1939.

== Barnstead's method ==
Each body is placed in a sealed bag stenciled with a unique number. The body is stripped. Clothes and shoes are destroyed to avoid souvenir hunters. Personal belongings are catalogued and placed in a sealed bag with the same number. Hopefully the personal effects include some ID, but with or without ID the body is referred to by its unique number. A catalogue of all is made including a description of the body: height, weight, rough age and appearance. At least two people must be present to deter theft. If a body has no belongings then a shoe may be kept to help identification. If a body lacks any ID a photograph is also taken.

On the CS Mackay-Bennett a log book was created using one page per body: the next body found taking the next sequential number.

=== Continuing use ===
In 1992 and 2001 Barnstead's meticulous records, combined with modern DNA methods, allowed identification of several further Titanic victims.

== Popular culture ==
Barnstead is a central figure in the documentary/docu-drama TV film, Titanic: The Aftermath (2012) in which he is portrayed by then-71 year old, Richard Donat.
