= Phase IV (2001 film) =

2001 Canadian film

- Film Poster
- Directed by: Bryan Goeres
- Written by: Zani Leo (Story); Jeff Hare and Bryan Goeres (Screenplay)
- Produced by: George Shamieh; Carlo Liconti
- Starring: Dean Cain; Brian Bosworth; Mimi Kuzyk; Heather Mathieson; Richard Donat
- Cinematography: John Holosko
- Edited by: Andy Horvitch
- Music by: Sean Murray
- Production companies: American Cinema Independent; Equinox Entertainment
- Distributed by: 20th Century Fox Home Entertainment; FWP Productions; Free Dolphin International; M.I.B.
- Release date: July 16, 2001
- Running time: 103 minutes
- Countries: Canada; United States
- Language: English

Phase IV is a 2001 Canadian-American direct-to-video action-thriller film starring Dean Cain and Brian Bosworth. It was directed by Bryan Goeres.

== Plot ==
Journalist Simon Tate is investigating the apparently "unrelated" accidental deaths of several students at a local university. When his friend, Dr. Benjamin Roanic, becomes a prime suspect and is then subsequently murdered, Simon sets out to prove Roanic's innocence and establish a link between the deaths and an AIDS-related drug test program.

== Cast ==
- Dean Cain as Simon Tate
- Stephen Coats as Benjamin Roanic
- Brian Bosworth as Detective Steven Birnam
- Mimi Kuzyk as Diana Holt
- Heather Mathieson as Carla Tate
- Richard Donat as Karl Dean

== Reception ==
Robert Pardi from TV Guide gave the film two out of five stars, stating: "This anti-establishment action flick is an unsatisfying mix of cautionary sci-fi tale and Hitchcockian thriller." Glenn Erickson writing for the website DVD Talk gave the film two and a half out of five stars and said: "Most of the acting is reasonable. Bosworth's role is dull but Dean Cain is likeable in a numbskull kind of way engineered to be acceptable in as many foreign markets as possible."
