= Unknown Child (Titanic victim) =

RMS Titanic victim identified in 2007

Sidney Leslie Goodwin
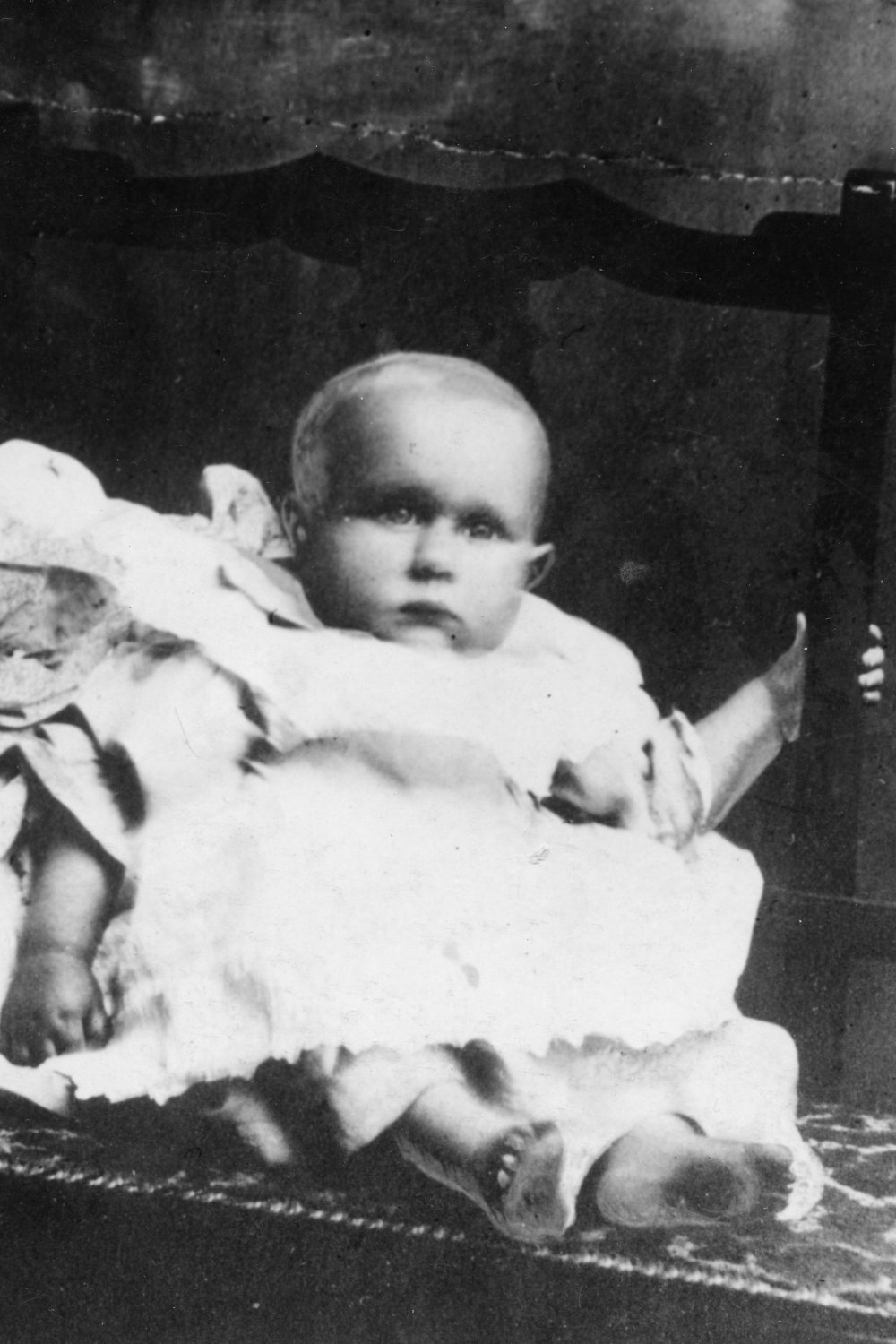
- Goodwin, c. 1911
- Born: Sidney Leslie Goodwin; 9 September 1910; Melksham, Wiltshire, England
- Died: 15 April 1912 (1 year, 225 days); Atlantic Ocean
- Resting place: Fairview Lawn Cemetery, Halifax, Nova Scotia, Canada
- Known for: Being the youngest recovered victim of the Titanic

Sidney Leslie Goodwin (9 September 1910 – 15 April 1912) was a 19-month-old British victim of the sinking of the RMS Titanic, whose body was later recovered by the Mackay-Bennett. Unidentified until 2007, Goodwin was previously widely known as the Unknown Child. For almost a century, Goodwin's gravestone in the Fairview Cemetery read "Erected to the memory of an unknown child whose remains were recovered after the disaster to the Titanic April 15th 1912".

Initial DNA testing in 2002 pointed to third-class passenger Eino Viljami Panula as the Unknown Child's real identity. However, subsequent testing in 2007 conclusively identified the child's remains as those of fellow third-class toddler Sidney Leslie Goodwin.

== Burial ==
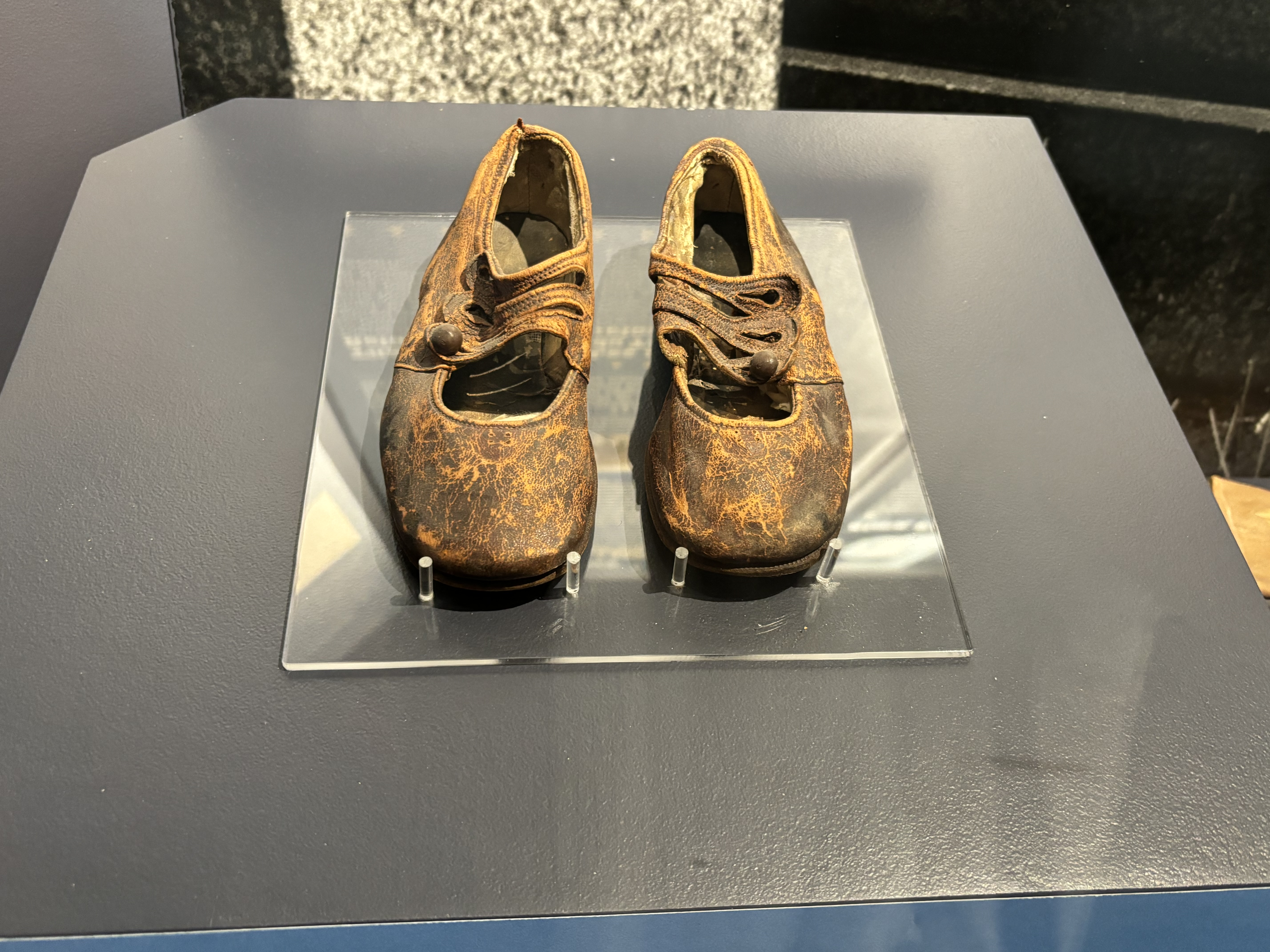
The preserved pair of brown shoes recovered with Body No. 4

The body of a fair-haired toddler was the fourth pulled from the ocean by crewman Clifford Crease, from the recovery ship CS Mackay-Bennett, on 21 April 1912. The description read:

NO. 4 – MALE – ESTIMATED AGE, 2 – HAIR, FAIR.

CLOTHING – Grey coat with fur on collar and cuffs; brown serge frock; brown petticoat; flannel garment; pink woolen singlet; brown shoes and stockings.

No marks whatever.

PROBABLY THIRD CLASS

The sailors aboard the Mackay-Bennett, who were shocked by the discovery of the unknown boy's body, paid for a small white coffin, a proper funeral, and large headstone with the reward money received from Vincent Astor for recovering his father's body. The boy was buried on 4 May 1912 with a copper pendant placed in his coffin by recovery sailors that read "Our Babe".

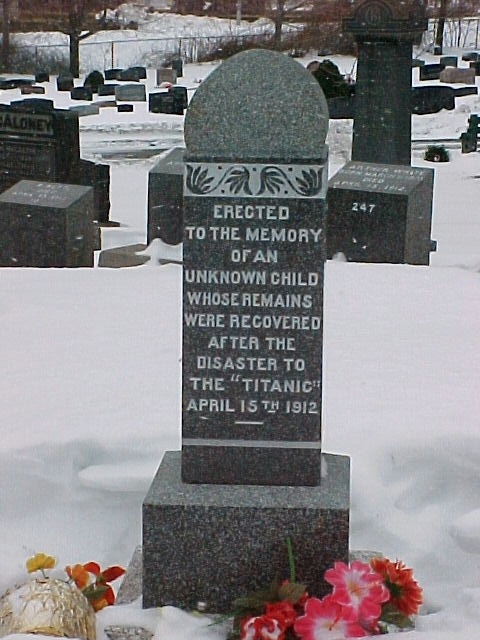
The grave of the unknown child in Fairview Cemetery in 2002, before identification

== Identification ==
Before 2002, Sidney was known simply as "The Unknown Child". His body, identified as that of a child around two years old, was initially thought to be that of either a two-year-old Swedish boy, Gösta Pålsson; or a two-year-old Irish boy, Eugene Rice, two other fair-haired toddlers who perished in the sinking.

In 2002, the American PBS television series Secrets of the Dead misidentified the body as Eino Viljami Panula, a 13-month-old Finnish baby, based on DNA testing of three teeth and a small, weathered bone. The show traced the child's DNA to a Finnish woman by the name of Magda Schleifer whose grandmother's sister was Maria Emilia Panula. Another relative of the Panula family, Hildur Panula-Heinonen, has written several extensive articles related to the family.

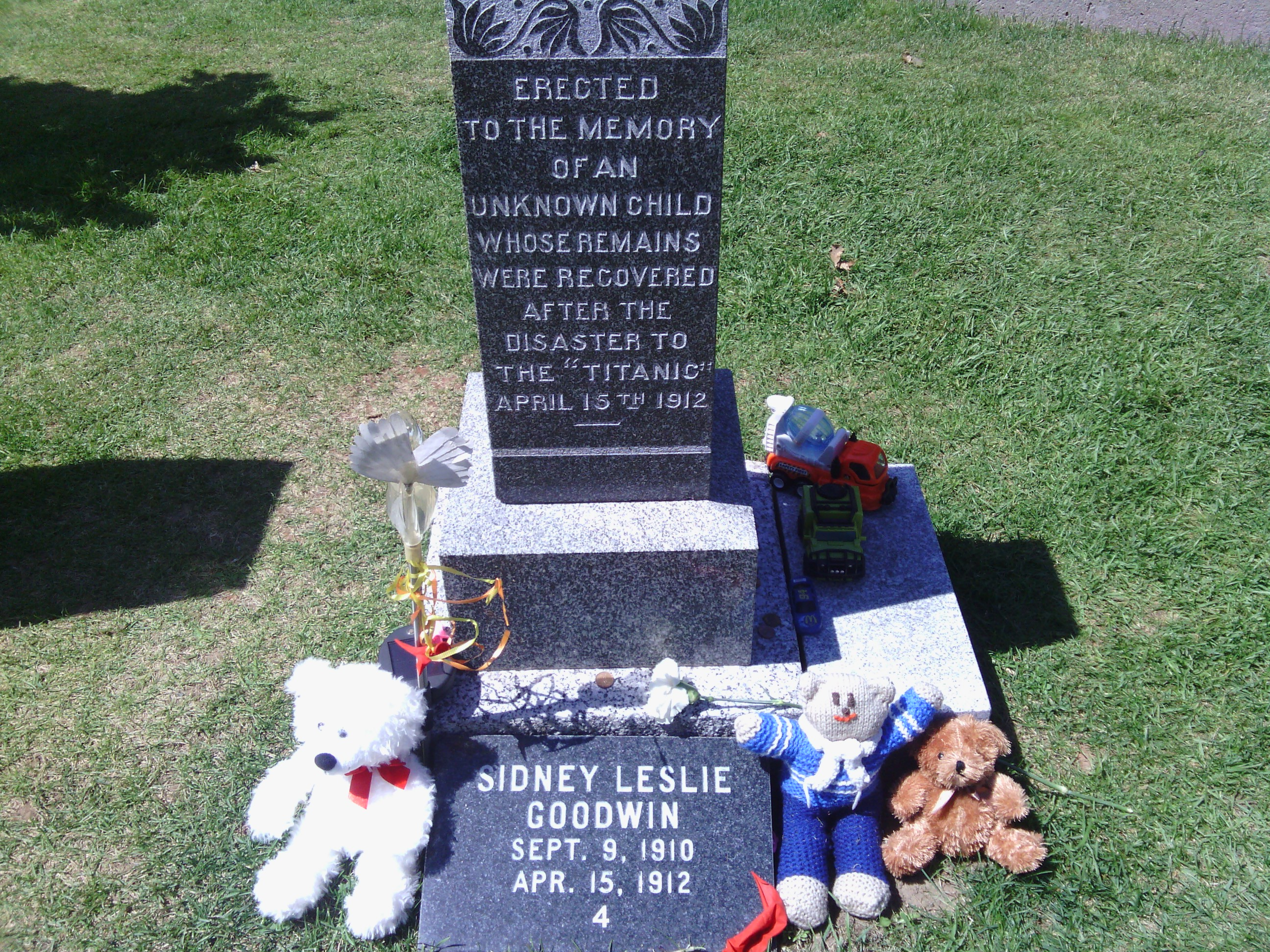
The grave of the unknown child in Fairview Cemetery in 2014, after identification

In 2007, however, Canadian researchers at Lakehead University tested the child's HVS1, a type of mitochondrial DNA molecule, and it did not match the Panula family. DNA extracted from the exhumed remains and DNA provided by a surviving maternal relative helped positively match the remains to Sidney, and the re-identification was announced on 30 July 2007.

Although the bodies of two other children, both older boys, were recovered, it was Sidney who came to be a symbol of all the children lost in the sinking. He is buried in Fairview Cemetery, Halifax, Nova Scotia, and a marker was added to the memorial with his name, dates of birth and death, and body number.

== Sidney Leslie Goodwin ==
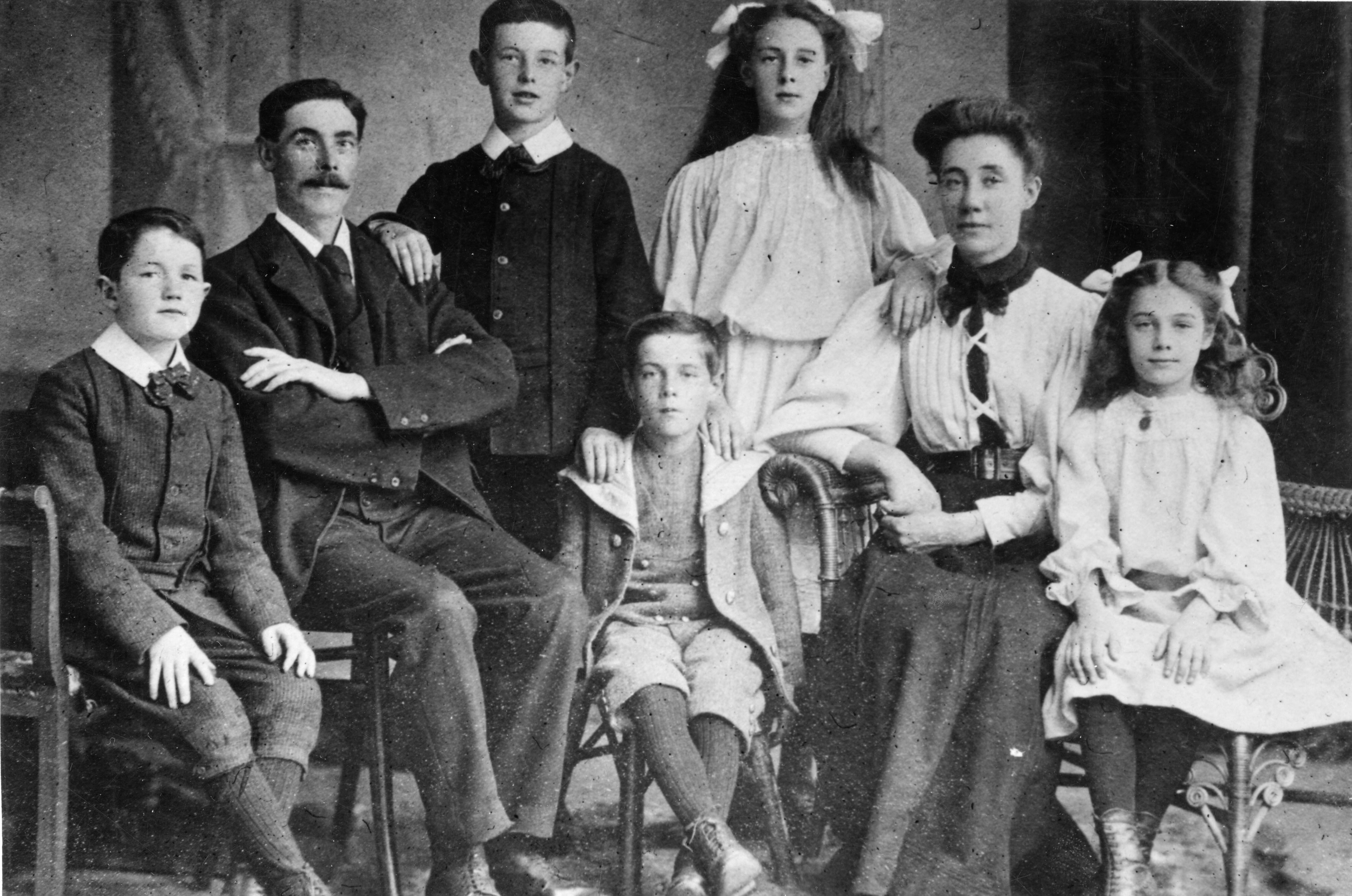
The Goodwin family. From left to right: William, Frederick, Charles, Harold (seated), Lillian, Augusta, Jessie. Sidney is not present. The entire family perished in the sinking.

Sidney Leslie Goodwin (9 September 1910 – 15 April 1912) was a 19-month-old English boy who died during the sinking of the RMS Titanic. In 2008, mitochondrial DNA testing by bio-anthropologist Ryan Parr and the American Armed Forces DNA Identification Laboratory revealed his identity. Sidney Goodwin was the only member of his family whose body was recovered and subsequently identified.

Sidney was born on 9 September 1910 in Melksham, Wiltshire, England. He was the youngest child born to Frederick Joseph and Augusta (née Tyler) Goodwin. Sidney had five older siblings – Lillian, Charles, William, Jessie, and Harold.

Frederick's brother, Thomas, had already left England and was living in Niagara Falls, New York. Thomas wrote to Frederick, telling him about the opening of a power station there. It has been speculated that the Schoellkopf Hydroelectric Power Station (Station A), due to open in 1912, would have been his employer had he lived. Frederick, a compositor, packed up his wife and six children to prepare for the move. They booked third-class passage on the S.S. New York out of Southampton, but due to a coal strike that year the vessel's passage was delayed, and they were transferred to the RMS Titanic. They boarded the Titanic in Southampton as third-class passengers.

Not much is known about the Goodwins' activities during the voyage, except that they may have been separated by sex in opposite ends of the ship, Frederick and his older sons in the bow, and Augusta with Sidney and the girls in the stern. Harold met and spent some time with Frank Goldsmith, who survived.

By the time the Goodwins received a warning about the collision with the iceberg, all the lifeboats had been launched. The entire family perished in the sinking. With the exception of Sidney, none of their bodies were recovered or identified.

A pair of shoes, believed to be Sidney's, was donated to Halifax's Maritime Museum of the Atlantic in 2002 by the descendants of a Halifax police officer who guarded the bodies and clothing of Titanic victims.

In his book The Night Lives On, historian Walter Lord devoted a chapter ("What Happened to the Goodwins?") to the family, using the fact that they were English to challenge the White Star Line's implication that such high numbers of third-class passengers perished because they could not understand the English language. In September 2020, the Smithsonian Channel aired "The Curious Death of a Titanic Child", about the identification of Sidney Goodwin, as part of The Curious Life and Death of ... series.

== Eino Viljami Panula ==
The child was erroneously identified as Eino Viljami Panula (10 March 1911 – 15 April 1912). He was a young Finnish boy who died during the sinking of RMS Titanic. From 2002 to 2007, he was initially believed to be "The Unknown Child".

Eino was travelling with his mother, Maria Emilia Panula (born Maija Emelia Ketola-Ojala), and four older brothers, Ernesti Arvid (born 18 May 1895), Jaakko Arnold (born 8 February 1897), Juha Niilo (born 1 September 1904), and Urho Abraham (born 25 April 1909). Three other children died before the voyage: Juho Eemeli (23 October 1892 – 23 December 1892), Emma Iida (24 February 1901 – 8 April 1910) and Lyydia (17 June 1903 – 23 December 1903).

The family was heading to Coal Center, Pennsylvania, to join their father, Juha. All six members perished in the disaster. Eino Panula's body was never recovered.
