= List of protected heritage sites in Spa, Belgium =

This table shows an overview of the protected heritage sites in the Walloon town Spa, Belgium. This list is part of Belgium's national heritage.

| Object | Year/architect | Town/section | Address | Coordinates | Number^{?} | Image |
|---|---|---|---|---|---|---|
| The facades and roofs of two adjoining houses called "Hôtel de Lorraine" and "Le Ritz" ^{(nl)} ^{(fr)} | | Spa | Place Pierre Legrand, rue du Marché n°2 en 4 en rue de l'Hôtel de ville n°1, Spa | 50.492329°N 5.866703°E | 63072-CLT-0001-01 Info | |
| The oldest parts built in 1774, the orphanage from Spa Casino now known as "Waux-Hall" ^{(nl)} ^{(fr)} | | Spa | | 50.488305°N 5.869032°E | 63072-CLT-0005-01 Info | De oudste delen gebouwd in 1774, het weeshuis van Spa, nu Casino, geheten "Waux-Hall" |
| Ensemble of the royal house and its surroundings ^{(nl)} ^{(fr)} | | Spa | Spa | 50.492335°N 5.855938°E | 63072-CLT-0006-01 Info | |
| Certain elements of the royal villa ^{(nl)} ^{(fr)} | | Spa | avenue Reine Astrid n°77, Spa | 50.491978°N 5.857146°E | 63072-CLT-0007-01 Info | Bepaalde elementen van de koninklijke villa |
| Ensemble of the park Sept Heures ^{(nl)} ^{(fr)} | | Spa | Spa | 50.493727°N 5.858372°E | 63072-CLT-0008-01 Info | Ensemble van het park van Sept Heures |
| Pavilion of Hesse-Rhinfels ^{(nl)} ^{(fr)} | | Spa | Spa | 50.493519°N 5.870075°E | 63072-CLT-0009-01 Info | Paviljoen van Hesse-Rhinfels |
| The woods and groves of Havette ^{(nl)} ^{(fr)} | | Spa | Spa | 50.484449°N 5.871748°E | 63072-CLT-0010-01 Info | |
| Fountain of Sauvenière ^{(nl)} ^{(fr)} | | Spa | Spa | 50.485462°N 5.888534°E | 63072-CLT-0011-01 Info | Fontein van Sauvenière |
| The facades and roofs of the old house Dommartin ^{(nl)} ^{(fr)} | | Spa | rue Félix Delhasse n°s 24-26-28 en 30 | 50.492741°N 5.866067°E | 63072-CLT-0012-01 Info | |
| The oak called "Al Bilance ' growing on the edge of the road-Limbourg Luxembourg ^{(nl)} ^{(fr)} | | Spa | Sart-lez-Spa | 50.482749°N 5.918327°E | 63072-CLT-0013-01 Info | |
| Certain parts of the building "John Cockerill": north facade, east gable and roof ^{(nl)} ^{(fr)} | | Spa | Avenue Reine Astrid n°250, Spa | 50.488500°N 5.840922°E | 63072-CLT-0015-01 Info | |
| The Leopold II Gallery which is located in the Park Sept Heures (listed by Royal Decree of 13 January 1977) ^{(nl)} ^{(fr)} | | Spa | | 50.492952°N 5.861282°E | 63072-CLT-0016-01 Info | Leopold II Galerie bevindt zich in het Park van Sept Heures (geklasseerd bij Koninklijk Besluit van 13 januari 1977) |
| Facades, roofs, hallway, staircase, dining room, two offices on the ground floor and an upper room of the old Hôtel Britannique ^{(nl)} ^{(fr)} | | Spa | rue de la Sauvenière n°8, Spa | 50.490751°N 5.869368°E | 63072-CLT-0017-01 Info | Gevels, daken, hal, trap, eetkamer, twee kantoren op de begane grond en een bovenzaal van het oude Hôtel Britannique |
| Facades and the totality of the old "Hôtel de Bourbon" ^{(nl)} ^{(fr)} | | Spa | rue Delhasse n°32 | 50.492633°N 5.865734°E | 63072-CLT-0018-01 Info | Gevels en de totaliteit van het oude "Hôtel de Bourbon" |
| Street Facades, gabled roofs and the totality of the house ^{(nl)} ^{(fr)} | | Spa | rue de Wauxhall n°4, Spa | 50.490558°N 5.867057°E | 63072-CLT-0019-01 Info | |
| Street facades, gables, and the totality of the roof of the houses ^{(nl)} ^{(fr)} | | Spa | rue de Wauxhall n°6 en 8, Spa | 50.490470°N 5.867111°E | 63072-CLT-0020-01 Info | |
| The sidewalks along the buildings on the rue du Waux-Hall n ° s 4, 6 and 8 and the sidewalk for the garden of No. 8 ^{(nl)} ^{(fr)} | | Spa | rue du Waux-Hall n°s 4, 6 en 8 | 50.490475°N 5.867006°E | 63072-CLT-0021-01 Info | |
| Facades and roofs of the building ^{(nl)} ^{(fr)} | | Spa | Place Royale n°17, Spa | 50.492719°N 5.864495°E | 63072-CLT-0023-01 Info | |
| Tiled balustrade outside ^{(nl)} ^{(fr)} | | Spa | avenue Henrijean n°63, Spa | 50.484284°N 5.856368°E | 63072-CLT-0024-01 Info | |
| Old school, hotel for travelers was called "Le Grand Hôtel", now town hall ^{(nl)} ^{(fr)} | | Spa | place de l'Hôtel de Ville n°44 | 50.493517°N 5.866736°E | 63072-CLT-0025-01 Info | Oude middelbare school, werd hotel voor reizigers genaamd "Le Grand Hôtel", tegenwoordig raadhuis |
| Walls inside and outside with access platform, and the lobby of the spa ^{(nl)} ^{(fr)} | | Spa | rue Royale, Spa | 50.492037°N 5.864320°E | 63072-CLT-0026-01 Info | Gevels binnen en buiten met toegangsbordes, en de lobby van de spa |
| Facades and roofs of the castle of Fraineuse ^{(nl)} ^{(fr)} | | Spa | avenue Amédée Hesse n°27, Spa | 50.496359°N 5.887207°E | 63072-CLT-0027-01 Info | |
| Ice cellar ^{(nl)} ^{(fr)} | | Spa | Spa | 50.488586°N 5.861064°E | 63072-CLT-0028-01 Info | |
| Facades and roof, the staircase and painted ceiling on the first floor of the building ^{(nl)} ^{(fr)} | | Spa | rue du Marché n°22-26 | 50.492482°N 5.867864°E | 63072-CLT-0029-01 Info | Gevels en dak, de trap en het geschilderde plafond op de eerste verdieping van het gebouw |
| Facades and roofs of Pouhun Pierre-le-Grand ^{(nl)} ^{(fr)} | | Spa | Spa | 50.492125°N 5.867312°E | 63072-CLT-0030-01 Info | Gevels en daken van Pouhun Pierre-le-Grand |
| Interior of Pouhun Pierre-le-Grand ^{(nl)} ^{(fr)} | | Spa | | 50.492118°N 5.867361°E | 63072-CLT-0031-01 Info | Interieur van Pouhun Pierre-le-Grand |
| Facades and roofs of the votive chapel Leloup Thomas, situated on the corner of the streets Rue de la Chapelle and Rue Albin Body ^{(nl)} ^{(fr)} | | Spa | | 50.490201°N 5.860685°E | 63072-CLT-0032-01 Info | |
| Factory pavilion named Felix Bernard ^{(nl)} ^{(fr)} | | Spa | la Heid de Spa, promenade Reikem | 50.490649°N 5.841382°E | 63072-CLT-0035-01 Info | |
| Double avenue of lime trees on the Fawetay and chemin de la Heid des Pairs and environment on a strip of ten feet wide on both sides of the double driveway ^{(nl)} ^{(fr)} | | Spa | chemin de Fawetay, Spa | 50.482282°N 5.855626°E | 63072-CLT-0036-01 Info | |
| Old cemetery of Spa ^{(nl)} ^{(fr)} | | Spa | rue des Erables, Spa | 50.497569°N 5.862655°E | 63072-CLT-0037-01 Info | Oude begraafplaats van Spa |
| Ensemble Waux-Hall, except the wing from the 20th century ^{(nl)} ^{(fr)} | | Spa | | 50.488305°N 5.869032°E | 63072-PEX-0001-01 Info | Ensemble van Waux-Hall, uitgezonderd de vleugel uit de 20e eeuw |
| Leopold II Gallery ^{(nl)} ^{(fr)} | | Spa | | 50.492952°N 5.861282°E | 63072-PEX-0002-01 Info | |

== See also ==
- List of protected heritage sites in Liège (province)
- Spa, Belgium
