= Titanic: The Aftermath =

2012 drama documentary

Titanic: The Aftermath is a dramatized documentary that focuses on the events that occurred in the lives of the survivors and those who lost people after the sinking of the Titanic. The ninety minute film was made in Halifax, Nova Scotia and first premiered on April 15, 2012. The film was released during the 100th anniversary of the tragedy, and originally aired on the Discovery Channel.

== Cast ==
- Jeremy Akerman as Harold Wingate
- Rhys Bevan-John as Postman
- Jennifer Bradley as Mary Costin
- Marty Burt as Canon Kenneth Hind
- Josh Cruddas as Jock Hume
- Richard Donat as John Henry Barnstead
- Geoff Dunsworth as David Sarnoff
- John Dunsworth as Fredrick A. Hamilton
- Dennis Envoldsen as Vincent Astor
- Heather-Alexa Ross as Madeleine Astor
- Brian Heighton as John Snow
- Gary Levert as Captain Frederick Larnder
- Josh MacDonald as New York Times Journalist
- Christopher Shore as Andrew Hume
- Vanessa Walton-Bone as Susan Costin
- Hank White as Casket Maker
