= Spa, Belgium =

City in Liège Province, Wallonia, Belgium

Spa Spå (Walloon)
- City and municipality
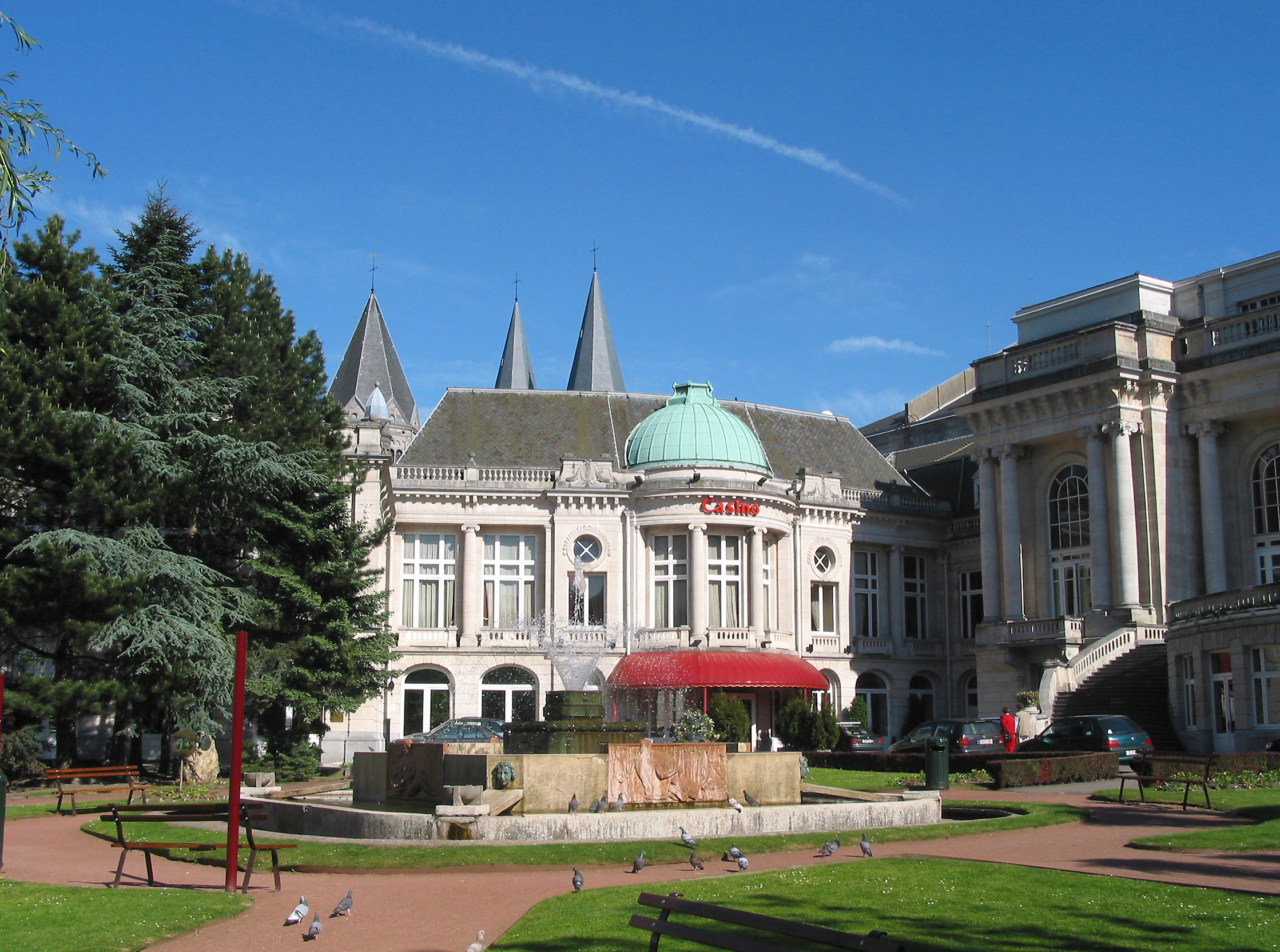
- The Casino of Spa

- Flag Coat of arms

- Location of Spa in the province of Liège
- Interactive map of Spa
- Location in Belgium
- Coordinates: 50°29′33″N 5°51′51″E
- Country: Belgium
- Community: French Community
- Region: Wallonia
- Province: Liège
- Arrondissement: Verviers

Government
  - Mayor: Sophie Delettre (MR)
  - Governing party: MR

Area
  - Total: 39.85 km^{2} (15.39 sq mi)

Population (2018-01-01)
  - Total: 10,378
  - Density: 260.4/km^{2} (674.5/sq mi)
- Postal codes: 4900
- NIS code: 63072
- Area codes: 087
- Website: www.villedespa.be

UNESCO World Heritage Site
- Part of: The Great Spa Towns of Europe
- Criteria: Cultural: (ii)(iii)
- Reference: 1613
- Inscription: 2021 (44th Session)

Spa (French pronunciation: [spa]; Walloon: Spå) is a municipality and city of Wallonia in the province of Liège, Belgium, whose name became an eponym for mineral baths with supposed curative properties. It is in a valley in the Ardennes mountains 35 km (22 mi) south-east of Liège and 45 km (28 mi) south-west of Aachen. In 2006, Spa had a population of 10,543 and an area of 39.85 km^{2} (15.39 sq mi), giving a population density of 265/km^{2} (690/sq mi).

Spa is one of Belgium's most popular tourist destinations, being renowned for its natural mineral springs, and production of "Spa" mineral water, which is exported worldwide. The motor-racing Circuit de Spa-Francorchamps, just south of the nearby village of Francorchamps, also hosts the annual Formula One Belgian Grand Prix and various endurance races such as the 24 Hours of Spa. The world's first beauty pageant, the Concours de Beauté, was held in Spa on 19 September 1888. The town also hosted the Tour de France on 5 July 2010, when stage 2 of the race ended there.

In 2021, Spa became part of the transnational UNESCO World Heritage Site the Great Spa Towns of Europe, for its famous mineral springs and architectural testimony to the rise of European bathing culture in the 18th and 19th centuries.

== Toponymy ==
Among the various hypotheses put forward as to the etymological origin of the name Spa is that of "gushing spring", from the Latin sparsa meaning "scattered" and "gushing", past participle of spargere ("scatter", "sprinkle" or "moisten"). Another connects the word to the meaning of "free space", from the Walloon spâ and from the Latin spatia, plural of spatium.

The place has been known since Roman times, when the location was called Aquae Spadanae. For this reason, the city's name is sometimes presented as the acronym of various Latin phrases, such as salus per aquam or sanitas per aquam, meaning "health through water"; it is in reality a backronym, an a posteriori fabrication of a fictitious acronym.

The term Spa has since become eponymous with any place having a natural water source that is believed to possess special health-giving properties, known as a spa.

== History ==
=== Pre-20th century ===
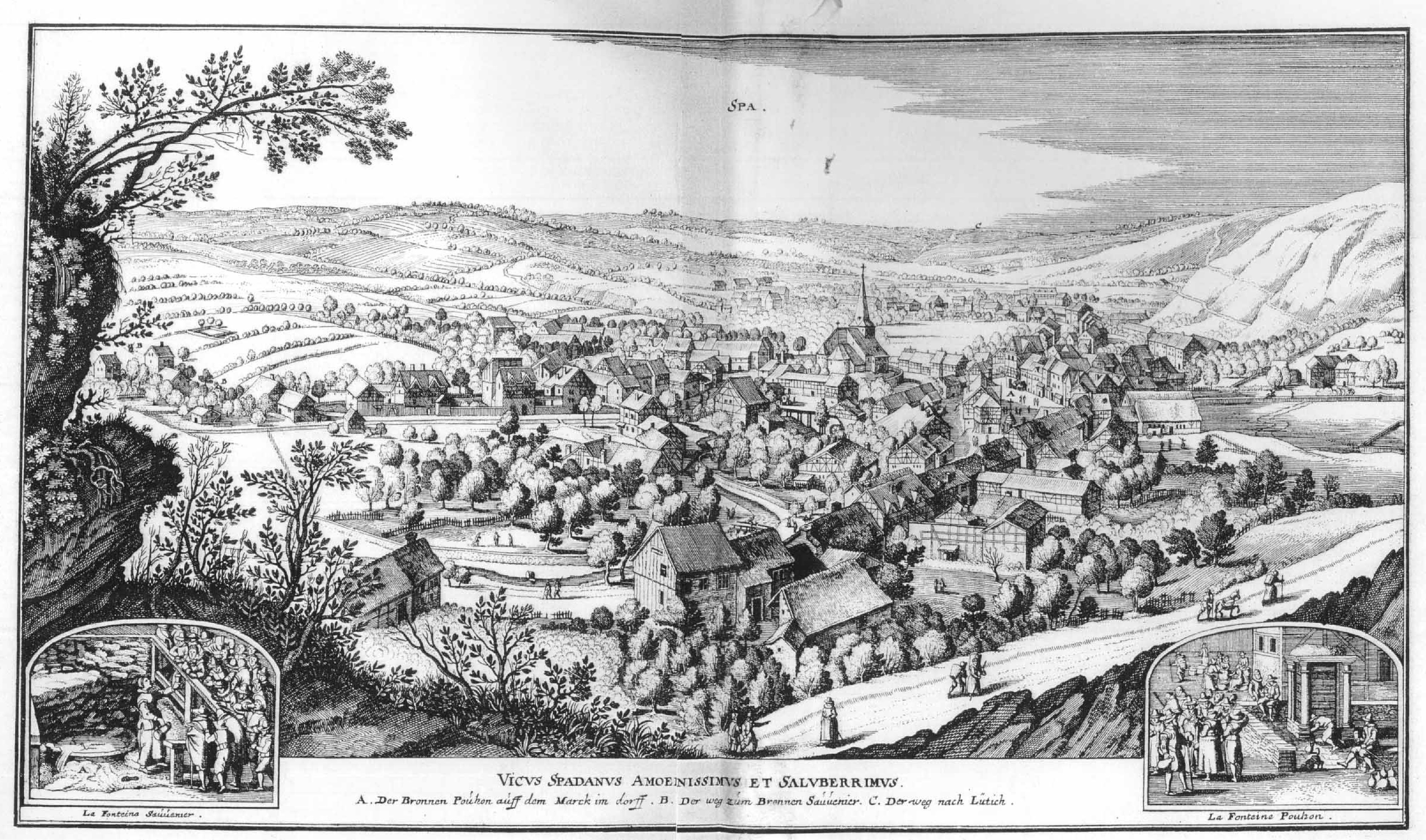
View of Spa in 1647, engraving by Matthäus Merian the Elder

As the site of cold springs with alleged healing properties, Spa has been frequented as a "water-taking" place since classical antiquity. Pliny the Elder (died 79 CE) noted, "There is a famous spring in Tungri, a state of Gaul, whose water, sparkling with bubbles, has a ferruginous taste that is only noticeable when the drink is finished. This water purges the body, cures third-grade fevers and dispels calculous affections. The same water, put on the fire, becomes cloudy and eventually turns red." (C lib. XXXI VIII)

The spa town grew in the Middle Ages, in the oldest iron and steel centre of Liège Province. The ban Spa was created around 1335 and included two urban concentrations: vilhe of Creppe and vilhe Spas, 2 km (1.2 mi) away. Prior to the exploitation of mineral water, the steel industry developed communication lines, which made it possible to develop the spa town.

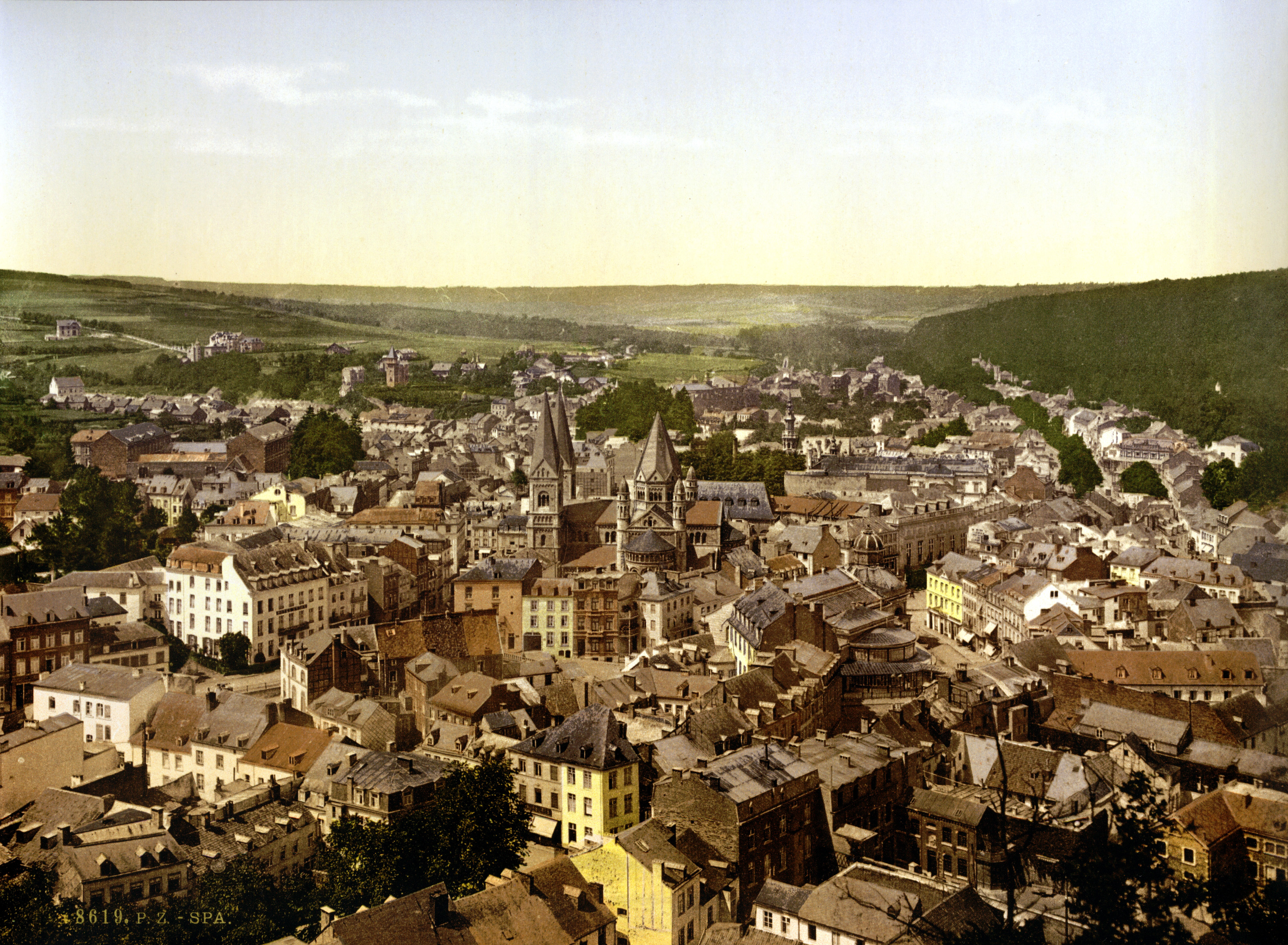
Print of Spa, c. 1895

As early as 1547, Agustino, physician to the King of England, Henry VIII, stayed in Spa and helped give knowledge to the world of the value of the Spa water. In 1559, Gilbert Lymborh wrote of "acid fountains of the Ardennes forest and primarily those located in Spa". It was translated into Latin, Italian and Spanish. In July 1565, the gentry of the provinces met in Spa under the pretext of taking the waters. At the hotel "Aux Armes d’Angleterre", those present agreed to oppose the edicts of Philip II as austere and intolerant; this led to the historic 1566 "Compromise of Nobles". In 1654, the stay of the exiled pretender to the English throne, Prince Charles, brought even greater fame to Spa. From 1699, a postal system was set up between Spa and the outside world.

Since the 18th century, casinos have been located in Spa. The town continued to grow as a fashionable resort in the 19th century, and was extended during the reign of King Leopold II. Buildings such as the Thermal Baths (1868), the Pouhon Peter the Great (1880), and the Leopold II Gallery (1880) date from this period.

=== 20th century ===
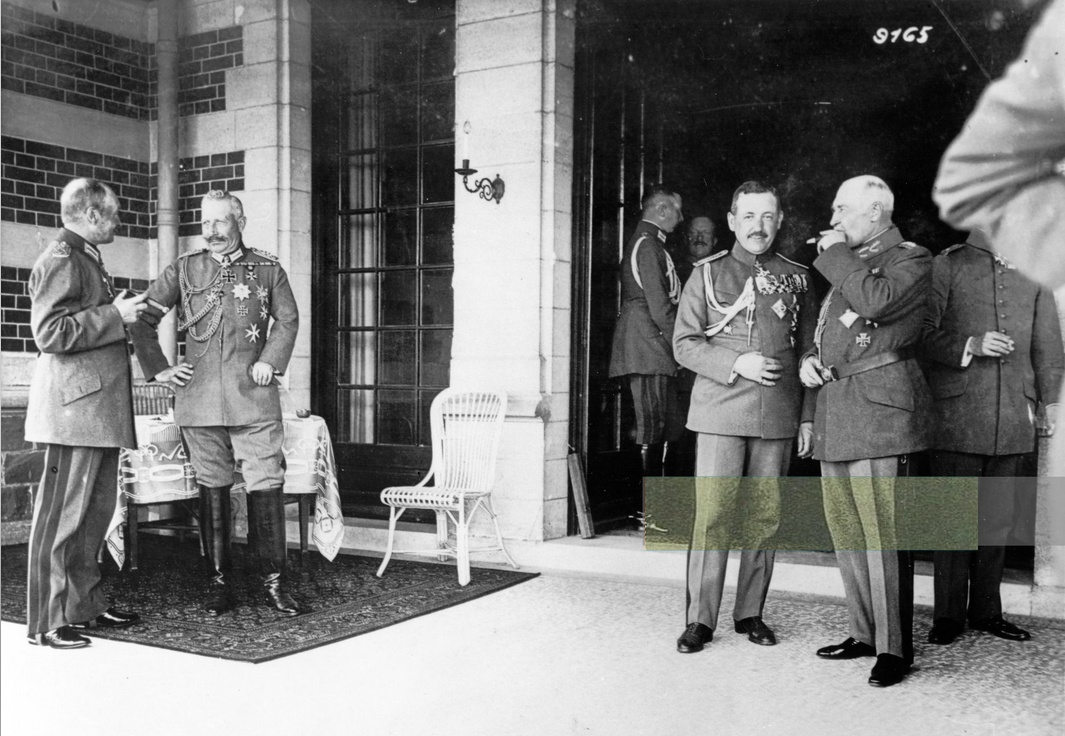
Kaiser Wilhelm II and his staff at Villa du Neubois in Spa in 1918

During World War I, Spa operated as an important German convalescent hospital town between 1914 and 1917. In 1918, the German Army established its principal headquarters in Spa, and from there the delegates set out for the French lines to meet Marshal Foch and to sue for peace in the consultations leading up to the Armistice that ended the First World War. The general headquarters of Kaiser Wilhelm II were, in 1918, the last place where he resided before his abdication due to the German surrender. In July 1920, the town hosted the Spa Conference, a meeting of the Supreme Council, which dealt with the war reparations owed by the defeated Reich to the Allies.

The Circuit de Spa-Francorchamps was established in 1921, in the vicinity of Spa. Despite its name, the racetrack has never been located within Spa: it is instead in the nearby town of Stavelot.

World War II saw Spa reoccupied by the Germans, but the town escaped the Battle of the Bulge in 1945 that stopped, luckily for Spa, right at its gates. The Marshall Plan helped Belgium to recover quickly. In the 1950s and 1960s, mass tourism gradually developed, diminishing Spa's reliance on the elite as customers. These were decades of social tourism as well, with an increasingly large number of Flemish and Dutch customers, while the Walloons went en masse to the Belgian coast in Flanders. Relaxation tourism replaced the thermal aspect of Spa.

The 1980s and 1990s heralded the start of a renewal of the infrastructure and influence of Spa. On 17 May 1983, to mark the 400th anniversary of the export of Spa waters, HM King Baudouin visited the new facilities of the Spa Monopole SA, the Henrijean Hydrology Institute and the Thermal Establishment. In 1994, a new French song festival started: Les Francofolies de Spa. In 1997, the area of Spa-Bérinzenne opened the Regional Center for Initiation to the Environment, one of whose specialties is water.

=== 21st century ===
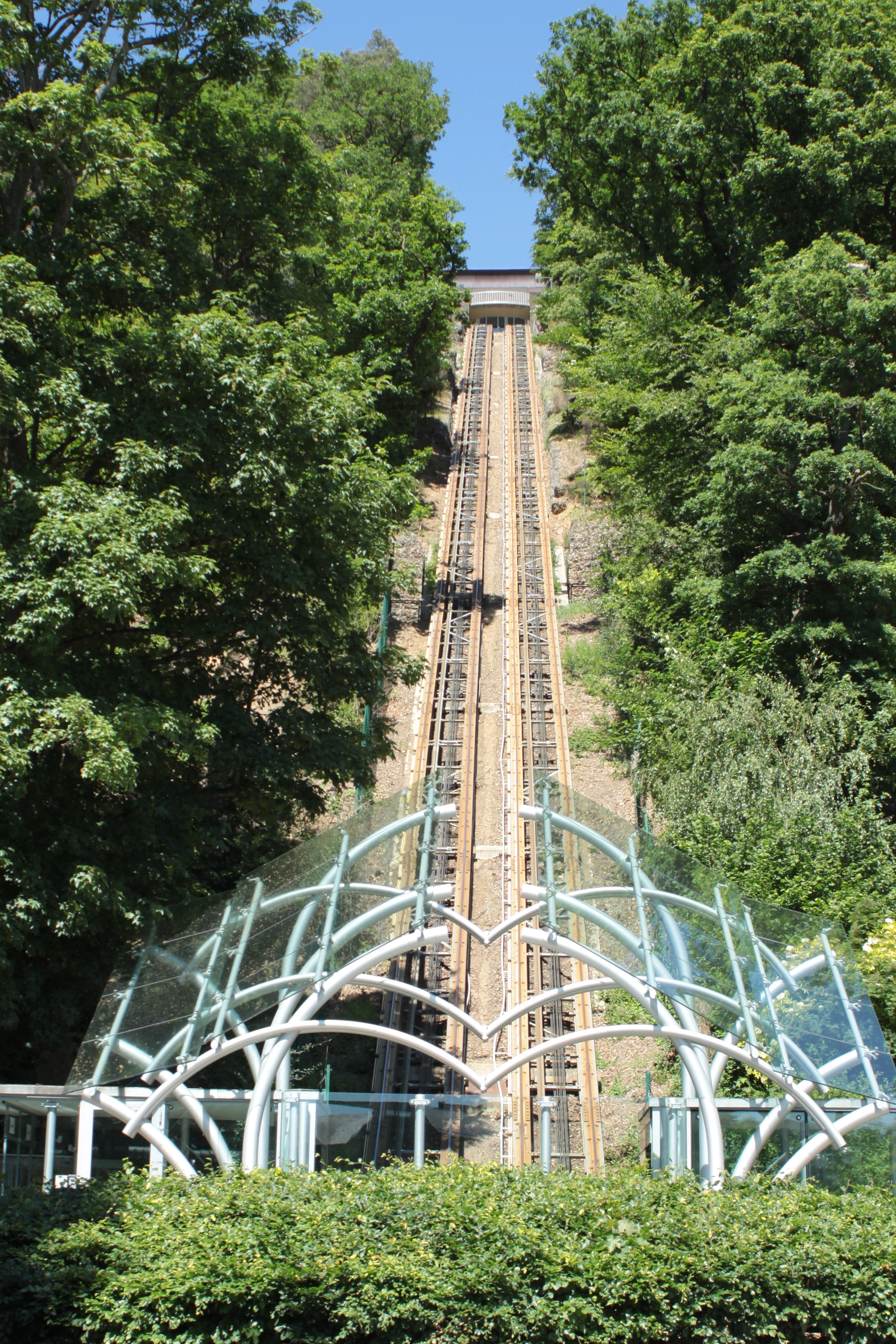
Funicular to the Thermoludism center

The old Thermal Baths were closed in 2004. In 2005, a new thermal center, Thermoludism, opened on the Annette and Lubin hill with panoramic views of the city. It is directly linked by funicular to the heart of the city and a new luxury hotel.

In 2007, the Spa-Francorchamps circuit completely renewed its infrastructure to comply with the best international standards, allowing it to continue to host the annual Belgian Formula One Grand Prix 1, in addition to many other annual sporting events.

== Geography and geology ==
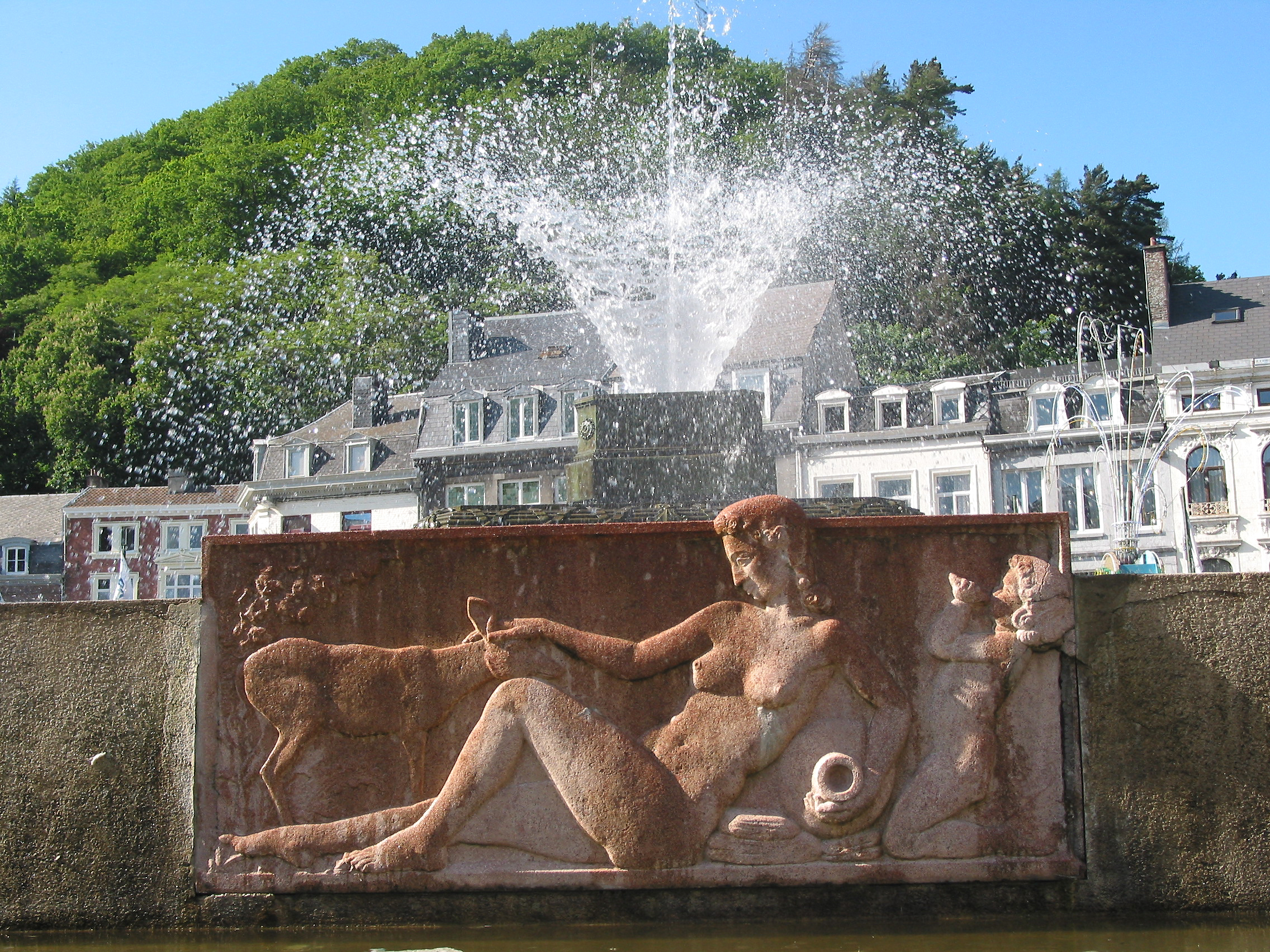
Spa, the water city

Spa is located on the borders of the Ardennes massif, at the gateway to the High Fens in the Wayai valley. The city center is surrounded by three wooded hills including Annette and Lubin to the north. The town borders the rural municipalities of Theux, Jalhay, Stavelot and Stoumont in the district of Verviers in the province of Liège. The municipal area is 39.89 km (24.79 mi); including 7.9 km (4.9 mi) of built and related land, 5.6 km (3.5 mi) of agricultural land and 23.6 km (14.7 mi) of forests and wooded land.

Many of the famous mineral springs in Spa are located on a hillside south of the town. In total, there are more than 300 cold mineral springs in Spa and its surroundings, classified into two types: light mineral waters and natural sparkling waters (called 'pouhons' locally). The light mineral waters come from recent rainfall on the Malchamps Moor, roughly 4 km (2.5 mi) south-west of the town and are filtered through layers of peat, quartz, and phyllite. In contrast, the pouhon waters come from rainfall that may be decades old, having percolated through calcareous rocks hundreds of meters underground.

== Climate ==
Spa has an oceanic climate that is made more continental by its higher elevation and inland position compared to other Belgian climates at lower level or closer to the sea. Spa has a relatively high precipitation year-round, with tricky weather something that the Spa-Francorchamps race track is known for. The elevation also results in cooler summers and frequent winter frost along with snowfall. Spa is quite gloomy, although averaging both a drier and sunnier climate than nearby locations Stavelot and Malmedy that are also surrounding the race track.

Climate data for Spa (1991–2020 normals; extremes since 1950)
Month	Jan	Feb	Mar	Apr	May	Jun	Jul	Aug	Sep	Oct	Nov	Dec	Year
Record high °C (°F)	14.5 (58.1)	19.5 (67.1)	23.1 (73.6)	26.3 (79.3)	30.0 (86.0)	31.8 (89.2)	36.7 (98.1)	35.0 (95.0)	30.9 (87.6)	24.1 (75.4)	19.5 (67.1)	17.0 (62.6)	36.7 (98.1)
Mean maximum °C (°F)	9.8 (49.6)	11.6 (52.9)	16.2 (61.2)	21.1 (70.0)	24.8 (76.6)	28.1 (82.6)	29.5 (85.1)	29.4 (84.9)	24.2 (75.6)	19.7 (67.5)	14.5 (58.1)	10.3 (50.5)	31.6 (88.9)
Mean daily maximum °C (°F)	3.9 (39.0)	4.8 (40.6)	8.6 (47.5)	12.9 (55.2)	16.6 (61.9)	19.5 (67.1)	21.5 (70.7)	21.3 (70.3)	17.5 (63.5)	12.8 (55.0)	7.7 (45.9)	4.5 (40.1)	12.6 (54.7)
Daily mean °C (°F)	1.5 (34.7)	1.8 (35.2)	4.8 (40.6)	8.3 (46.9)	12.0 (53.6)	15.0 (59.0)	17.1 (62.8)	16.8 (62.2)	13.4 (56.1)	9.6 (49.3)	5.2 (41.4)	2.2 (36.0)	9.0 (48.2)
Mean daily minimum °C (°F)	−0.9 (30.4)	−1.1 (30.0)	1.0 (33.8)	3.7 (38.7)	7.5 (45.5)	10.4 (50.7)	12.6 (54.7)	12.3 (54.1)	9.3 (48.7)	6.3 (43.3)	2.7 (36.9)	0.0 (32.0)	5.3 (41.6)
Mean minimum °C (°F)	−8.4 (16.9)	−8.3 (17.1)	−4.9 (23.2)	−2.2 (28.0)	0.7 (33.3)	4.8 (40.6)	7.4 (45.3)	7.4 (45.3)	5.0 (41.0)	0.9 (33.6)	−3.1 (26.4)	−6.2 (20.8)	−11.0 (12.2)
Record low °C (°F)	−20.0 (−4.0)	−21.1 (−6.0)	−13.7 (7.3)	−9.6 (14.7)	−3.5 (25.7)	0.0 (32.0)	1.4 (34.5)	1.0 (33.8)	1.0 (33.8)	−6.2 (20.8)	−9.0 (15.8)	−17.8 (0.0)	−21.1 (−6.0)
Average precipitation mm (inches)	100.3 (3.95)	88.4 (3.48)	86.4 (3.40)	67.0 (2.64)	82.0 (3.23)	90.9 (3.58)	96.8 (3.81)	102.0 (4.02)	89.2 (3.51)	86.6 (3.41)	92.8 (3.65)	118.4 (4.66)	1,100.8 (43.34)
Average precipitation days (≥ 1 mm)	14.6	13.3	13.2	10.2	12.2	12.0	12.3	12.1	11.1	12.3	14.2	16.6	154.1
Mean monthly sunshine hours	53	72	124	174	195	202	211	201	154	108	58	42	1,594
Source 1: Royal Meteorological Institute
Source 2: Infoclimat

== Transport ==
Spa has two railway stations: Spa and Spa-Géronstère, where local trains of SNCB/NMBS link the city with Theux, Verviers and Aachen. The railway line used to extend further south towards Trois-Ponts, Vielsalm and Luxembourg. Local and regional bus services in Spa are provided by the Walloon transport company TEC. Spa is located on the crosspoint of national roads N62, N629 and N686. The nearest motorway is the A27 (E42), where a junction for Spa is located in the commune of Jalhay.

== Heraldry ==
Coat of arms of Spa

The coat of arms for Spa is a stylized pouhon housed in a neoclassical monument to the covering surrounded by a protective wall opened its facade. The monument is topped by a blue banner bearing the "Spa-Pouhon" inscriptions. "Argent masonry money pouhon of sand topped with gold-SPA Pouhon inscriptions on a blue background." The city colours are yellow and blue. The stylized pouhon is inspired by the monument that housed the Pouhon Peter the Great until 1820.

Under the Ancien Régime, the shield was commonly used in spa towns. It was customary for the spa guests to leave their arms at the hotel where he had stayed in recognition of the benefits of the waters. At Spa, many hotels have inscriptions like "In the Arms of England", "the Duke of Orleans," "To the King of Poland", etc.

== Notable residents ==
- Georges Krins, a violinist on the RMS Titanic.
- Giacomo Meyerbeer, composer, completed his opera here Robert le diable in 1830.

== References in popular culture ==
The 1975 film Barry Lyndon is partly set in Spa during the eighteenth century.

The 1975 film Belle is wholly set in contemporary Spa and its environs.

Agatha Christie's fictional detective Hercule Poirot was born in Spa.

== International relations ==
=== Twin towns – sister cities ===
Spa is twinned with:

- La Garde, Var, France
- Cabourg, France
- Eguisheim, France
- Gabicce Mare, Italy
- Bad Homburg, Germany
- Bad Mondorf, Luxembourg
- Jūrmala, Latvia
- Hinterzarten, Germany
- Bad Tölz, Germany
- Terracina, Italy
- Chur, Switzerland

== See also ==
- List of protected heritage sites in Spa, Belgium
- Les Francofolies de Spa
- Spa Conferences (First World War)
- Spa Conference (29 September 1918)
