= Titanic Musicians' Memorial =

Public sculpture in Southampton

Coordinates: 50°54′37.9″N 1°24′18.8″W

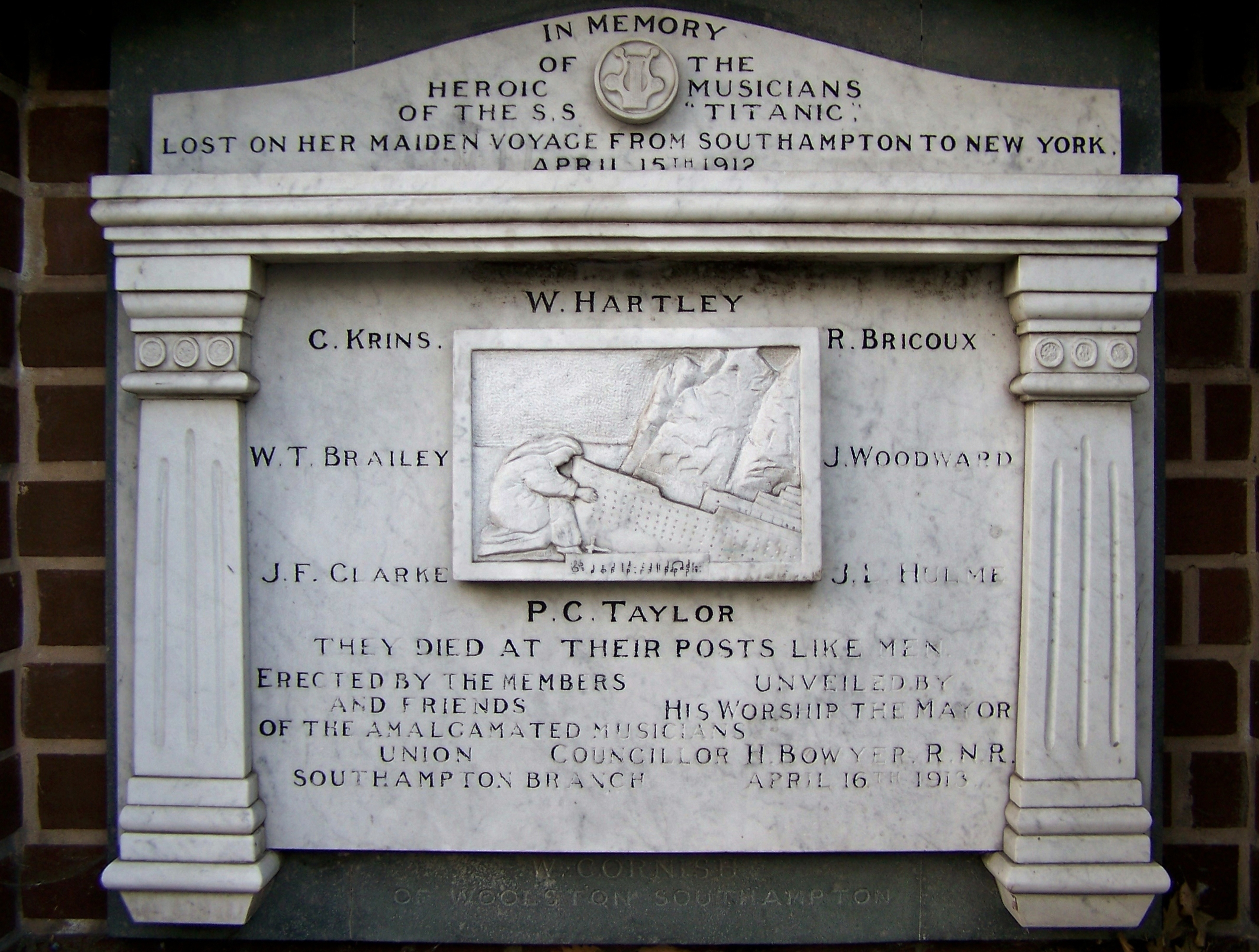
RMS Titanic Musician's Memorial, Southampton

The Titanic Musicians' Memorial is a memorial in Southampton, United Kingdom, to the musicians who died in the RMS Titanic disaster on 15 April 1912. The original Titanic Musicians' Memorial was unveiled by the Mayor of Southampton, H Bowyer on 19 April 1913, and was located in the old Southampton library. This library along with the memorial were destroyed during World War II. A replica was erected in 1990. The plaque features a musical inscription, the opening bars of the 19th century hymn, 'Nearer, My God, to Thee' by Sarah Flower Adams, carvings showing a grieving woman and an iceberg, and an inscription with the names of the musicians on the Titanic, including bandleader Wallace Hartley, all of whom died.

== History ==
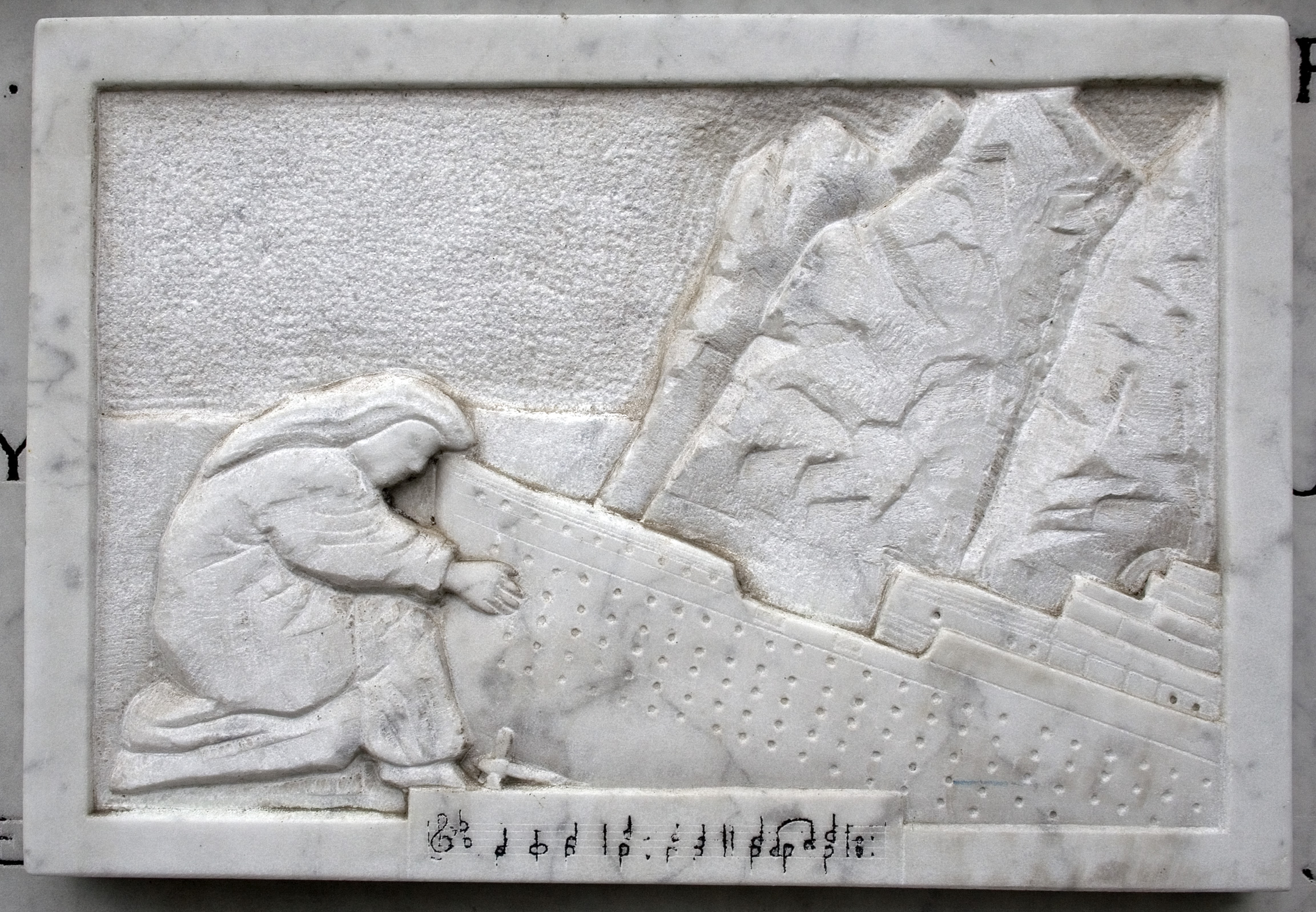
Detail of the central carving on the memorial

The original memorial was destroyed by the Luftwaffe's bombing in 1940 together with the library. A replica memorial, made in 1990 by W. Cornish of Woolston, was installed on the same site. It was unveiled by Titanic survivors Edith Haisman, Millvina Dean, Bertram Dean and Eva Hart on 7 March 1990. It is located on the side of the offices of Paris Smith, solicitors on the corner of Cumberland Place and London Road, in Southampton.

After the Titanic hit an iceberg and began to sink, Hartley and his fellow band members assembled in the first class lounge and started playing music to help keep the passengers calm. They later moved to the forward half of the boat deck, where they continued to play as the crew loaded the lifeboats. Many of the survivors said that the band continued to play until the very end. The inscription 'Nearer, My God, to Thee' has an association with the RMS Titanic as it was reported by one passenger that the ship's band played the hymn as the Titanic sank. However, the actual 'final' song played by the band is unclear; "Nearer, My God, to Thee" has gained popular acceptance. Former bandmates claimed that Hartley said he would either play "Nearer, My God, to Thee" or "O God, Our Help in Ages Past" if he was ever on a sinking ship. This memorial is dedicated to these musicians: Wallace Hartley (bandmaster, violin), Roger Marie Bricoux (cello), William Theodore Brailey (piano), John Wesley Woodward (cello), John Frederick Preston Clarke (string bass, viola), John Law Hume (violin), Percy Cornelius Taylor (piano) and Georges Alexandré Krins (violin) who all lost their lives on the Titanic.
