= Vince Coleman (train dispatcher) =

Canadian train dispatcher (1872–1917)

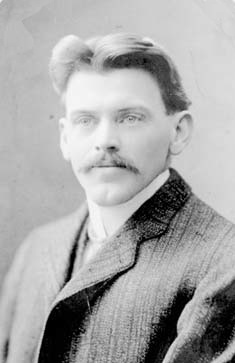
Vince Coleman

Patrick Vincent Coleman (13 March 1872 – 6 December 1917) was a train dispatcher for the Canadian Government Railways (formerly the ICR, Intercolonial Railway of Canada) who was killed in the Halifax Explosion. He is best known for successfully warning an inbound passenger train to stop ahead of the then-imminent explosion. He is remembered as one of the heroic figures of the disaster.

== Event ==
On the morning of 6 December 1917, the 45-year-old Coleman and Chief Clerk William Lovett were working in the Richmond station, surrounded by the railway yards near the foot of Richmond Street, only a few hundred feet from Pier 6. From there, trains were controlled on the mainline into Halifax. The line ran along the western shore of Bedford Basin from Rockingham Station to the city's passenger terminal at the North Street Station, located a mile to the south of Richmond Station. Coleman was an experienced dispatcher who had been commended a few years earlier for helping to safely stop a runaway train.

At approximately 8:45 a.m., there was a collision between SS Mont-Blanc, a French munitions ship carrying a cargo of high explosives, and a Norwegian vessel, SS Imo. Immediately thereafter Mont-Blanc caught fire, and the crew abandoned the ship. The vessel drifted from near the mid-channel over to Pier 6 on the slack tide in a matter of minutes and beached herself. A sailor, believed to have been sent ashore by a naval officer, warned Coleman and Lovett of her cargo of high explosives. The overnight express train No. 10 from Saint John, New Brunswick, carrying nearly 300 passengers, was due to arrive at 8:55 a.m. Before leaving the office, Lovett called CGR terminal agent Henry Dustan to warn him of a burning ship laden with explosives that was heading for the pier. After sending Lovett's message, Coleman and Lovett were said to have left the CGR depot. However, Coleman returned to the telegraph office and continued sending warning messages along the rail line as far as Truro to stop trains inbound for Halifax. An accepted version of Coleman's Morse code message reads as follows:

Hold up the train. Ammunition ship afire in harbour making for Pier 6 and will explode. Guess this will be my last message. Good-bye, boys.

The telegraphed warnings were apparently heeded, as the No. 10 passenger train was stopped just before the explosion occurred. The train was halted at Rockingham Station, on the western shore of Bedford Basin, approximately 6.4 kilometres (4.0 mi) from the downtown terminal. After the explosion, Coleman's message, followed by other messages later sent by railway officials who made their way to Rockingham, passed word of the disaster to the rest of Canada. The railway quickly mobilized aid, sending a dozen relief trains with fire and medical help from towns in Nova Scotia and New Brunswick on the day of the disaster, followed two days later by help from other parts of Canada and from the United States, most notably Boston. Even though Lovett had left the station, both he and Coleman were killed in the explosion.

Although historians debate whether Coleman's initial message actually contributed to stopping the No. 10 train, there is some documented evidence to indicate it did. No. 10's Conductor Gillespie reported to the Moncton Transcript that although running on time, "his train was held for fifteen minutes by the dispatcher at Rockingham."

Coleman's headstone in Mount Olivet Cemetery, Halifax, Nova Scotia

== Legacy ==
Vince Coleman was also the subject of a Heritage Minute and was a prominent character in the CBC miniseries Shattered City: The Halifax Explosion. The Heritage Minute and other sources contain historical inaccuracies in that Coleman is shown warning others in the area surrounding the depot station of the impending explosion. In reality the Richmond Station was surrounded by freight yards. Another error is the exaggeration of the number of passengers aboard the Saint John train. The four-car overnight passenger train contained a maximum of 300 people, not 700 as stated in the Heritage Minute. The warning message is also changed.

Coleman's telegraph key, watch and pen are on display in the Halifax Explosion exhibit at Halifax's Maritime Museum of the Atlantic.

Coleman is buried at Mount Olivet Cemetery in Halifax, at the intersection of Mumford Road with Joseph Howe Drive. A street is named after him in the Clayton Park neighbourhood of Halifax, and in 2007 a section of Albert Street near his old home was renamed Vincent Street. A condominium near Mount Olivet Cemetery on Bayer's Road is named The Vincent Coleman, also in his honour.

Coleman was inducted into the Canadian Railway Hall of Fame in 2004. A Halifax harbour ferry was named Vincent Coleman, by popular vote in the spring of 2017. The ferry was dedicated and officially entered service in a ceremony at the Halifax ferry terminal on 14 March 2018.

== Personal life ==
Coleman was survived by his wife Frances (1877–1970). She and the youngest of their four children were seriously injured in the explosion.

== See also ==
- PEPCON disaster – Roy Westerfield sacrificed himself to warn others of an imminent explosion.
- Miki Endo - During the 2011 Tōhoku earthquake she sacrificed herself to warn others of an imminent tsunami.
