= Baron de Hirsch Cemetery, Halifax =

Jewish cemetery in Nova Scotia, Canada

Shaar Shalom Cemetery
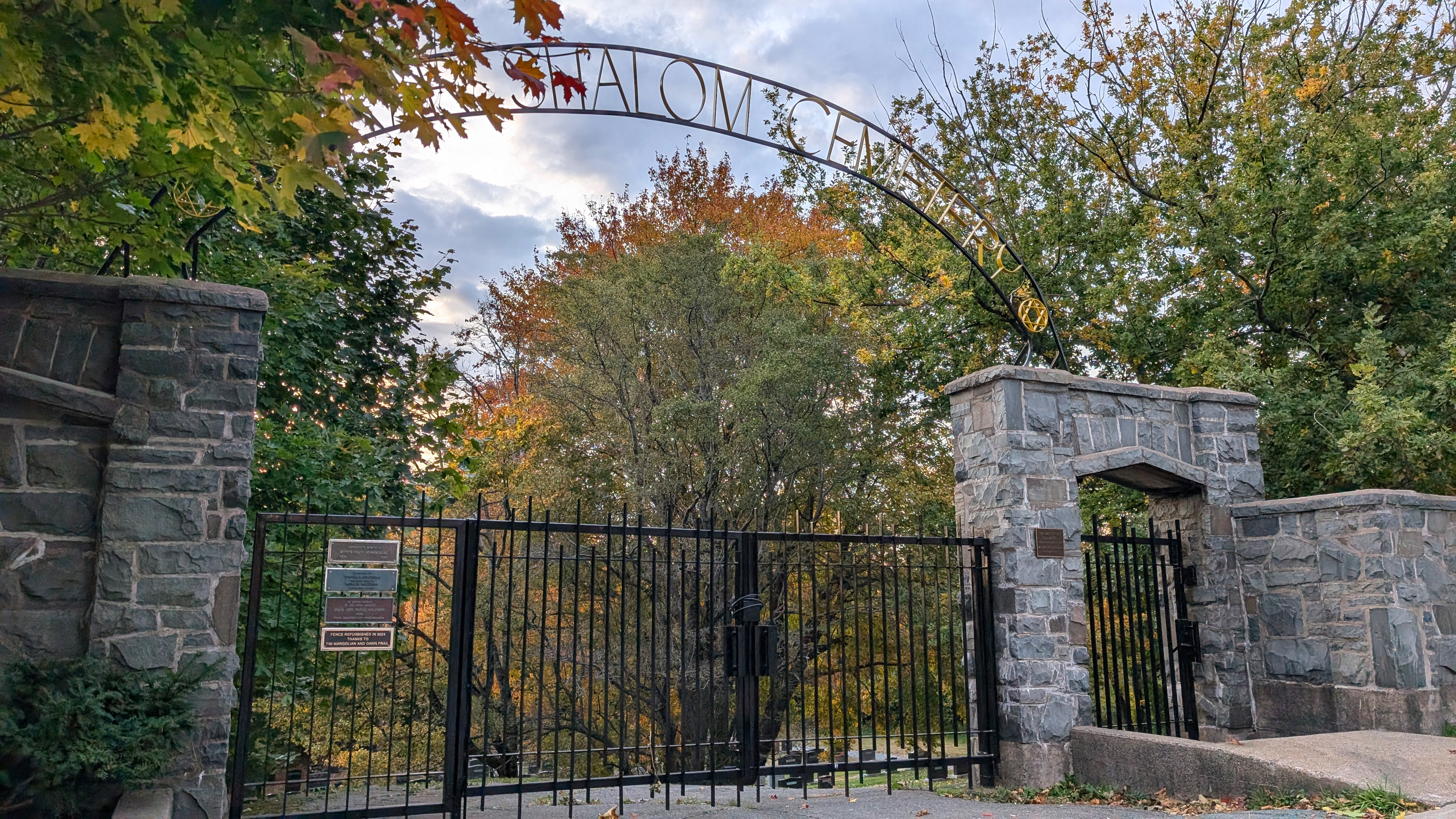
- The cemetery gate
- Interactive map of Shaar Shalom Cemetery

Details
- Established: 1893
- Location: Connaught Ave at Windsor St, Halifax, Nova Scotia
- Country: Canada
- Coordinates: 44°39′33.9″N 63°37′11.2″W
- Owned by: Shaar Shalom Congregation
- Website: https://theshaar.ca/cemetery/
- Find a Grave: Shaar Shalom Cemetery

The Baron de Hirsch Cemetery, also known as the Beth Israel Synagogue Cemetery, is a Jewish cemetery located on west side of Windsor Street at the intersection of Connaught Avenue beside Fairview Cemetery in the city of Halifax, Nova Scotia, Canada. It has been the burial ground of the congregation of the Beth Israel Synagogue of Halifax since 1893.

== History ==
The Baron De Hirsch Hebrew Benevolent Society, named for the philanthropist, Baron Maurice de Hirsch (1831–1896), of Munich, sought to acquire land on the outskirts of Halifax for a local cemetery. The Culvie Farm property was purchased for that purpose on 20 June 1893, by Abraham Michaels a local merchant who had lost his partner and with no Jewish cemetery had to ship him to NYC for burial, and the land was consecrated on 30 July 1893. Some changes to the boundaries of the cemetery were negotiated with the city in the 1950s due to the city's need to realign Windsor Street. The city provided additional property, but some original memorial walls had to be disassembled and moved. The new wall was dedicated on 30 September 1968. An anonymous donor since 2004 has funded renovations and expansion.

== RMS Titanic ==
Of the 209 bodies recovered after the sinking of the RMS Titanic in April 1912, 150 were buried in Halifax cemeteries. Ten victims were buried at Baron de Hirsch Cemetery, eight of whom unidentified. The others were the Titanic's saloon steward Frederick William Wormald and passenger Michel Navratil, Sr. While the intent was for Jewish victims to be buried in the cemetery based on initial body identification, it later turned out that the only two identified victims from Titanic in the cemetery were not Jewish. Wormald was Church of England and Navratil, who had boarded the ship under the name "Louis M. Hoffman", was Catholic.

The cemetery also contains a Commonwealth war grave of a Canadian soldier of World War I.
