= Mount Olivet Cemetery (Halifax, Nova Scotia) =

Roman Catholic cemetery in Nova Scotia, Canada

Coordinates: 44°38′56″N 63°37′35.5″W

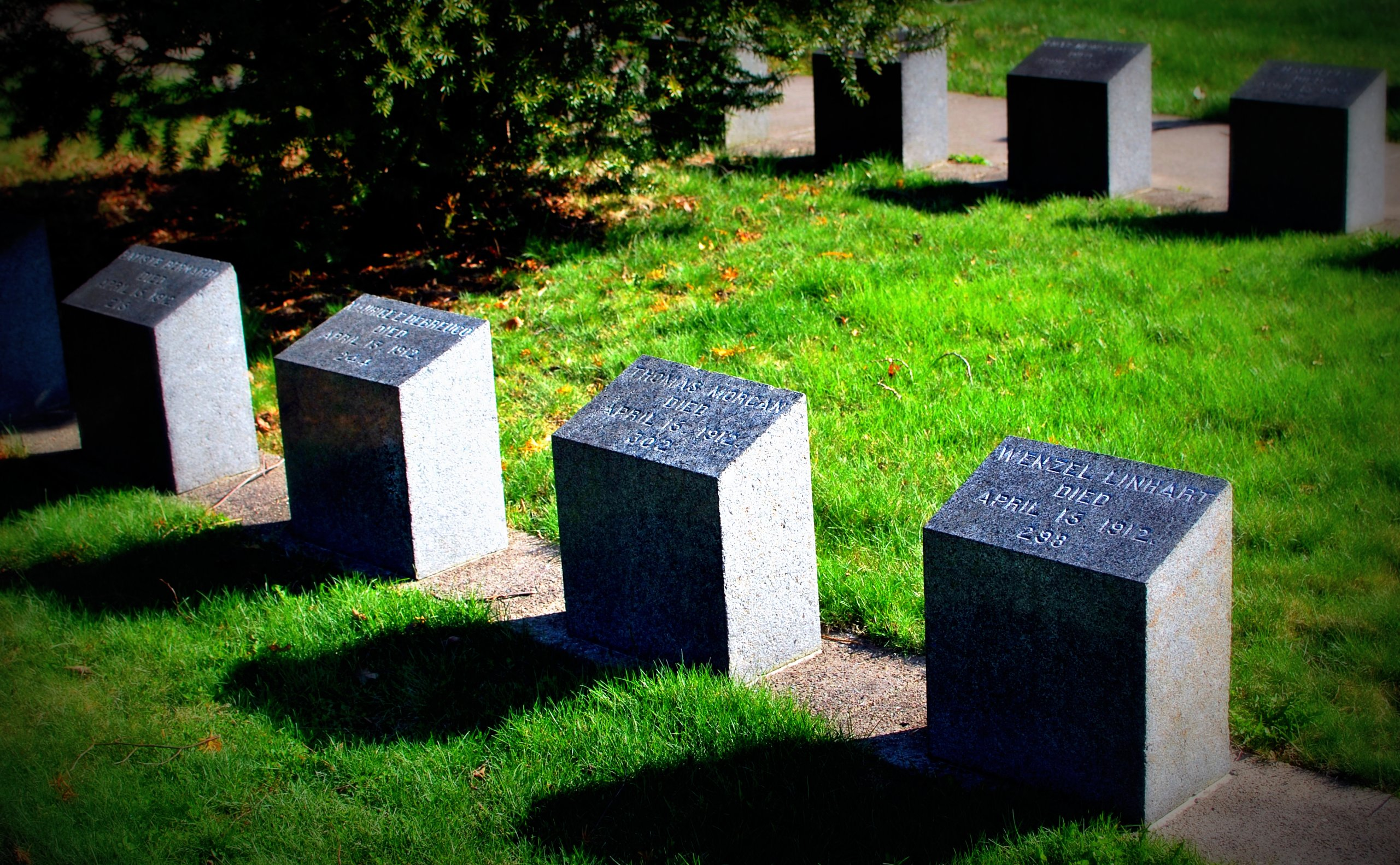
Graves of some of the dead due to the sinking of the RMS Titanic

Mount Olivet Cemetery is a Roman Catholic cemetery located in Halifax, Nova Scotia, Canada at which 19 bodies recovered from the RMS Titanic are buried.

Many of the dead from the 1917 Halifax Explosion are also buried here, including Vincent Coleman, the heroic railway dispatcher who sent warning of the explosion.

Vince Coleman's headstone in Mount Olivet Cemetery, Halifax, Nova Scotia

== War Graves ==
The Commonwealth War Graves Commission maintains 78 war graves in this cemetery. There are 68 Commonwealth service personnel buried here from World War I and 10 from World War II.
