= Frankfurt (disambiguation) =

Frankfurt am Main is a major city in Hesse, Germany.

Frankfurt may also refer to:

== Places ==
=== Germany ===
- Frankfurt (Oder), Brandenburg, on the Polish border
- Bezirk Frankfurt, a district of the German Democratic Republic (1952–1990)
- Frankfurt, a village in Markt Taschendorf, Bavaria
- Frankfurt, a settlement in Wanzleben, Saxony-Anhalt

==== Frankfurt am Main ====
- Free City of Frankfurt, (until 1806) within the Holy Roman Empire of the German Nation
- Grand Duchy of Frankfurt (1810–1813)
- Free City of Frankfurt, (1815–1866) an independent city-state and member of the German Confederation
- Frankfurt Parliament (German National Assembly founded during the revolutions of 1848)
- Rural district of Frankfurt, a rural district (Landkreis) in the Prussian province of Hesse-Nassau (1885–1910)
- Frankfurt Urban Environs Authority (Umlandverband Frankfurt) (1975–2001); See Kelsterbach
- Frankfurt Airport
- Frankfurt Stock Exchange
- Eintracht Frankfurt, a German sports club
- FSV Frankfurt, another German sports club
- Frankfurt School, of social theory and research and of philosophy

== People ==
- Akiva Frankfurt (d. 1597), German poet and rabbi
- Harry Frankfurt (1929–2023), professor of philosophy at Princeton University
- Suzie Frankfurt (1931–2005), American interior decorator
- Wilhelmina Frankfurt, American ballerina

== Other uses ==
- SMS Frankfurt, a German light cruiser warship
- SS Frankfurt, a German steamship
- Frankfurt am Main (A1412), a Berlin-class replenishment ship of the German Navy
- Frankfurt (icebreaker), an inland icebreaker built for the German waterways and shipping office
- Frankfurt plane, a special plane in the human skull
- Cocktail frankfurt, a miniature saveloy sausage
- Frankfurt Seamount, a seamount named after the German steamship
- Frankfurt School, sociology and critical theory

== See also ==
- Frankfurt Trade Fair
- Frankfurt Book Fair
- Frankfurt Motor Show
- Frankfurter (disambiguation)
- Frank N. Furter
- Frankfort (disambiguation)
- Frankford (disambiguation)
