= Senan Molony =

Irish journalist and writer

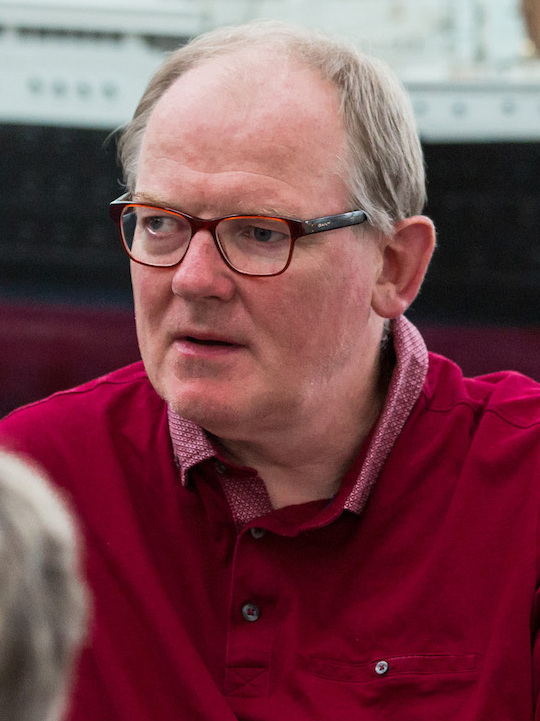
Molony in 2017

Senan Molony is an author as well as former journalist.

He got his first byline in June 1983. It was in the Irish press. He did freelance work. He got in with the evening herald. When he was in the star he was there for the Murder of Sophie Toscan du Plantier. He was doing crime at this time.

He went on to be Deputy Political Editor for the Irish Independent. He was the Irish Daily Mail's Political Editor between 2009 and 2019.

He broke the news of politician Michael Healy-Rae's Celebrities go Wild voting scandal, receiving the award for Scoop of the Year at the National Newspapers of Ireland's Journalism Awards. He also covered the Aengus Ó Snodaigh printer cartridge scandal.

He returned to the Irish Independent when it was the COVID pandemic. He was political correspondent until his retirement at the end of August 2026. The Tánaiste and Finance Minister Simon Harris said in the Dáil that "an esteemed member of our political press gallery is covering proceedings in this chamber for the very final time".

He married Brigid in 1998 and she gave birth to a son and two daughters.

== Books ==
His first book, Celtic Mists (Phoenix, 1987) is a parody of Irish history. The Phoenix Park Murders: Conspiracy, Betrayal and Retribution (Mercier, 2006) investigates the assassinations of Cavendish and Burke in the park in 1882. He authored The Irish Aboard Titanic (Mercier, 2000, 2012), A Ship Accused (Cedric, 2002); The Titanic and the Mystery Ship (Mercier, 2004); Titanic: Victims and Villains (Tempus, 2008), RMS Lusitania: An Irish Tragedy (Mercier, 2004), and Titanic Scandal: The Trial of the Mount Temple (Amberly, 2010).

== Theories ==
- RMS Titanic alternative theories#Fire in coal bunker
