= Sohm =

Sohm is a surname. Notable people with the surname include:

- Joseph Sohm, American history teacher and Producer-Author-Public Speaker
- Lisa Sohm (born 1955), American model
- Rudolph Sohm (1841–1917), German lawyer and Church historian
- Pascal Sohm (born 1991), German footballer
- Simon Sohm (born 2001), Swiss footballer
- Willi Sohm (1913–1974), Austrian cinematographer

== See also ==
- Sohm Abyssal Plain, plain in the North Atlantic
- Sohm Glacier
