= Frankfort micropolitan area =

The Frankfort micropolitan area may refer to:

- The Frankfort, Indiana micropolitan area, United States
- The Frankfort, Kentucky micropolitan area, United States

== See also ==
- Frankfort (disambiguation)
