= Mackay-Bennett Seamount =

Seamount offshore of Newfoundland and southwest of the Grand Banks

- Location within North Atlantic

Location
- Location: North Atlantic Ocean, 680 km (420 mi) southeast of Cape Race
- Group: Fogo Seamounts
- Coordinates: 41°21′N 48°57′W
- Country: Canada

Geology
- Type: Submarine volcano
- Age of rock: Early Cretaceous

Mackay-Bennett Seamount, also known as Mackay-Bennett Knoll, is an undersea mountain in the North Atlantic Ocean, located about 680 km (420 mi) southeast of Cape Race in Canadian waters off Atlantic Canada. It rises to a height of over 1,000 m (3,300 ft) and has an areal extent of 500 km^{2} (190 mi^{2}), making it slightly smaller than Carpathia Seamount to the southwest.

Mackay-Bennett Seamount is one of the seven named Fogo Seamounts. Its name is derived from CS Mackay-Bennett, a British cable ship that recovered deceased bodies from the Titanic disaster in 1912. Perhaps the best-known victim she recovered was The Unknown Child, a 19-month-old third class passenger who was later identified as Sidney Leslie Goodwin.
