= Fogo Seamounts =

Group of seamounts offshore of Newfoundland and southwest of the Grand Banks

- Location within North Atlantic
- Summit depth: 2,000 to 4,000 m (6,600 to 13,100 ft)

Location
- Location: North Atlantic Ocean, 500 km (311 mi) southeast of Newfoundland
- Coordinates: 41°15′N 51°00′W
- Country: Canada

Geology
- Type: Submarine volcanoes
- Age of rock: Early Cretaceous

The Fogo Seamounts, also called the Fogo Seamount Chain, are a group of undersea mountains southeast of the Grand Banks of Newfoundland in the North Atlantic Ocean. This seamount chain, lying approximately 500 km (310 mi) offshore from the island of Newfoundland, consists of several submarine volcanoes that have been extinct for millions of years. They are one of the few seamount chains located in Canadian waters off the coast of Atlantic Canada.

== Geology ==
The Fogo Seamounts are of Early Cretaceous age and form a broad zone of basaltic volcanoes off the continental shelf of Atlantic Canada. This zone narrows in the northwest and widens to 200 km (120 mi) in the southeast, a pattern that differs from the adjacent Newfoundland and New England seamounts which form narrow linear arrangements typical of seamount chains. Therefore, it is possible that the Fogo Seamounts formed in a more complex manner than the Newfoundland and New England seamounts. Basalts of the Fogo Seamounts chemically range from slightly alkalic to slightly tholeiitic and show ocean island basalt characteristics. The range of compositions is comparable to basalts in Hawaii.

More than 30 seamounts have been determined in the Fogo Seamount Chain from magnetic, bathymetric and seismic data. To the north and east, the Fogo Seamounts are partially buried under sediment due to their close proximity to the continental slope. In contrast, seamounts to the south are visible as discrete bathymetric features north of the J-Anomaly Ridge. They rise to depths of 2,000–4,000 m (6,600–13,100 ft) below sea level, with some showing flat-topped crests that measure 2 to 10 km (1.2 to 6.2 mi) across. These flat-topped seamounts represent guyots, having formed by coastal erosion of emergent volcanoes. This is supported by the presence of carbonate platform rocks capping the flat-topped crests, which were laid down in shallow water when the crests were at the sea surface millions of years ago. As thermal subsidence caused the underlying oceanic crust to decrease in elevation, the guyots eventually subsided to their present depth. Seamounts with steep crests also exist in the Fogo Seamount Chain and are characteristic of those that never emerge above sea level to form volcanic islands.

Several theories have been proposed to explain the origin of the Fogo Seamounts. One theory is that the seamounts formed as a result of the Canary hotspot passing beneath the Grand Banks. This is supported by three available age points on the seamounts, which may be interpreted to show that the seamounts become younger towards the southeast. However, their distribution may be more random as evidenced by the flat tops of the seamounts, which show no systematic pattern from northwest to southeast. Another theory is that the Fogo Seamounts represented mantle upwelling that could have been initiated by a slab-tear from Tethyan subduction beneath the Iberian Peninsula. A third theory is that asymmetric mantle upwelling related to ocean opening between the Iberian Peninsula and the Grand Banks formed the Fogo Seamounts, which produced highly asymmetric stretching of continental crust. A fourth theory is that the seamounts formed as a result of rifting of the Iberian Peninsula from the Grand Banks prior to the separation of Labrador from Europe and Greenland, which resulted in dextral strike-slip faulting in the Jeanne d'Arc Basin and on the Cobequid–Chedabucto fault system beginning in the Early Cretaceous.

== History ==
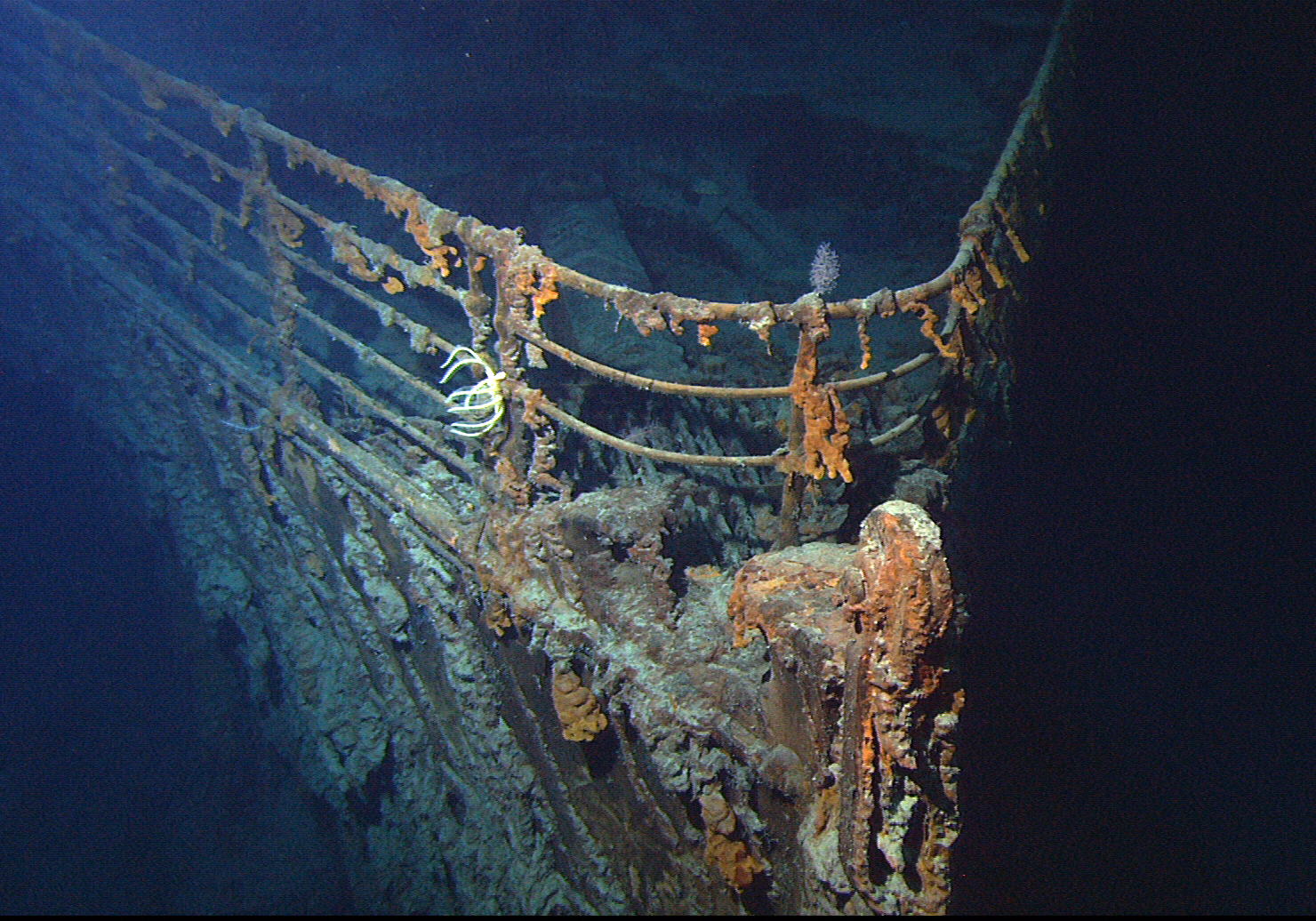
Titanic's bow, photographed in June 2004

The Fogo Seamounts are the location of the RMS Titanic wreck. After leaving Southampton on 10 April 1912, Titanic called at Cherbourg in France and Queenstown (now Cobh) in Ireland, before heading west to New York. On 14 April, four days into the crossing, she hit an iceberg at 11:40 p.m. ship's time. The collision caused the hull plates to buckle inwards along her starboard (right) side and opened five of her sixteen watertight compartments to the sea; she could only survive four flooding. Meanwhile, passengers and some crew members were evacuated in lifeboats, many of which were launched only partially loaded. A disproportionate number of men were left aboard because of a "women and children first" protocol for loading lifeboats. At 2:20 am, she broke apart and foundered with well over one thousand people still aboard. An estimated 705 survivors were rescued.

In 1986, a buried guyot on the continental slope at the northwesternmost end of the Fogo Seamount Chain was intersected by an exploratory well dubbed Narwhal F-99. The well penetrated a thick sequence of Cenozoic and Cretaceous sediments before coming into contact with seamount basalt 4,478 m (14,692 ft) below sea level. Shallow-water carbonate sediments were found to overlie the guyot and were abruptly overlain by hemipelagic shales. A series of coastal transgressions above the basalt suggest that final submergence of the guyot probably took place during the Berriasian of the Early Cretaceous.

The Fogo Seamounts were officially named in 1993 after the Portuguese word for fire, a reference to their volcanic history. Similarly named features include the Cape Verde island of Fogo and Pico do Fogo on Fogo Island, both of which are also volcanic in origin. In 2007–2008, the Northwest Atlantic Fisheries Organization (NAFO) was being challenged to consider the possible need for regulation of fishing effort on any seamounts within its jurisdiction of the Northwest Atlantic. The maximum economic depth of possible fishing was considered to be 2,000 m (6,600 ft). Therefore, NAFO closed two areas of the Fogo Seamounts to bottom fishing in an effort to address the impact of bottom fishing on vulnerable marine ecosystems. The Fogo Seamounts were still designated as a vulnerable marine ecosystem in 2012 along with the Newfoundland, New England and Corner Rise seamounts.

== Seamounts ==
Seven of the Fogo Seamounts are named after ships that offered aid or participated in the recovery efforts following the sinking of the RMS Titanic:

Name	Coordinates	Named after
Algerine Seamount	40°54′N 52°30′W	SS Algerine
Birma Seamount	40°52′N 52°04′W	SS Birma
Carpathia Seamount	41°6′N 49°33′W	RMS Carpathia
Frankfurt Seamount	42°16′N 53°00′W	SS Frankfurt
Mackay-Bennett Seamount	41°21′N 48°57′W	CS Mackay-Bennett
Montmagny Seamount	40°22′N 51°33′W	SS Montmagny
Mount Temple Seamount	41°32′N 51°09′W	SS Mount Temple

== See also ==
- List of volcanoes in Canada
- Volcanism of Eastern Canada
