= Algerine Seamount =

Seamount offshore of Newfoundland and southwest of the Grand Banks

- Location within North Atlantic

Location
- Location: North Atlantic Ocean, 560 km (350 mi) south of Cape Race
- Group: Fogo Seamounts
- Coordinates: 40°54′N 52°30′W
- Country: Canada

Geology
- Type: Submarine volcano
- Age of rock: Early Cretaceous

Algerine Seamount is an undersea mountain in the North Atlantic Ocean, located about 560 km (350 mi) south of Cape Race in the northeastern portion of the Sohm Abyssal Plain. Its summit is more than 2,000 m (6,600 ft) below sea level and rises to a height of over 1,200 m (3,900 ft). With an areal extent of 550 km^{2} (210 mi^{2}), Algerine Seamount is slightly bigger than the Ontarian city of Kingston. To the east, Algerine Seamount is bounded by Birma Seamount.

Algerine Seamount is one of the seven named Fogo Seamounts. Its name is derived from SS Algerine, a Newfoundland steamship that participated in the recovery efforts following the sinking of the RMS Titanic. She had recovered one body after spending 3 weeks searching the area.
