= Montmagny =

Montmagny may refer to:

- Montmagny, Quebec, Canada
- Montmagny Regional County Municipality, Quebec
- Montmagny Seamount, Canada
- Montmagny (federal electoral district)
- Montmagny (provincial electoral district) now part of Montmagny-L'Islet
- Montmagny, Val-d'Oise, a commune in France
- Montmagny, Switzerland, a commune
