= Frankfurter =

Frankfurter may refer to:

- Various varieties of sausage
  - Frankfurter Würstchen
  - Frankfurter Rindswurst
  - Vienna sausage, or also called a Frankfurter Würstel in Austria
  - Hot dog, a fully cooked sausage, traditionally grilled or steamed
- Frankfurter (surname)
- Frankfurter, a resident of Frankfurt am Main, Germany
- Frankfurter, a resident of Frankfurt an der Oder, Germany
- Frankfurter, a display typeface designed in 1970 for Letraset

== See also ==
- Dr. Frank-N-Furter, main antagonist in The Rocky Horror Show
- Frankfurt (disambiguation)
