= William Charles Boyden-Mitchell =

William Charles Boyden-Mitchell (1922–1988 in Norwich, Norfolk), better known as Bill Mitchell or Uncle Bill, was a radio presenter and broadcasting personality. He became known through his work with the BFBS (British Forces Broadcasting Service) during the 1960s and 70s, broadcasting to service Personnel of the British Army of the Rhine (BAOR), Royal Air Force Germany (RAFG) and their families who were stationed in West Germany. He achieved a cult following due to his eccentricities and his ‘Big Wood Stories’ that he wrote himself and performed live on the radio.

== BFBS Cologne and 'Kinder Club' ==
Bill Mitchell broadcast from the BFBS studios in Cologne, which opened in 1954 and were based in a large villa at 61 Parkstrasse in the affluent Cologne suburb of Marienburg. He was senior programme assistant and continuity announcer, and presented, as 'Uncle Bill', the daily children's radio programme 'Kinder Club'. The show featured music and children's stories as well as listener's requests, and was originally broadcast live at 5 p.m. after the end of each school day. These broadcasts were received by around 200,000 British listeners stationed in the Rheinland, but also reached a wider radio audience of both West and East Germans, Dutch, Belgian and Danish listeners, who could however not be acknowledged by the station as listeners, due to the terms of the station's performing rights.

== Big Wood Stories ==
Bill Mitchell was best known for his broadcasting voice(s) and his 'Big Wood Stories' that told of the daily lives and adventures of a cast of animals: Owl, Badger, Nightjar and Water Rat amongst many others. He wrote the stories himself and performed an episode each day live on the radio, giving every one of the many characters their own distinctive voice and characteristics. He also hand drew a detailed map of the imaginary world of ‘Big Wood’ with the sites of all the locations of the various adventures marked on it. Copies of this map were made available at military fêtes and open days and became a treasured possession for many forces children.

A number of the 'Big Wood stories' have since been uploaded onto the BFBS Radio Show Archive by Juergen Boernig, who was BFBS's archivist in Germany, with the help of Bill Mitchell's former colleague and fellow radio presenter Richard 'Asters' Astbury, MBE.

The stories were popular with children and adults alike. When interviewed by Dan van der Vat in 1975 for The Times, Bill Mitchell revealed that he had left England 26 years previously and felt that it had become "an alien land" to which he had no wish to return. However his stories paint a nostalgic picture of an England from bygone days and helped give listeners stationed abroad during the Cold War era a "morale-boosting link with home".

== Urban myths and legends ==
Uncle Bill was known as an eccentric who often presented his radio show in full scoutmaster's uniform, and there are a number of urban myths and legends surrounding him and his show. These include soldiers referring to each other by nicknames taken from Big Wood characters, drinking games played out whilst the Big Wood story was on air, and a rumour that a remark made after leaving his microphone inadvertently switched on at the end of a broadcast of the show may have led to Bill Mitchell's ultimate retirement from the BFBS.
