= J-Anomaly Ridge =

Undersea ridge near Newfoundland, Canada

Coordinates: 40°30′N 51°0′W

The J-Anomaly Ridge is a bathymetric feature in the North Atlantic Ocean, extending southwest from the eastern end of the Grand Banks of Newfoundland. It has a length of about 400 km (250 mi) and rises 1,200 m (3,900 ft) above the general level of the Sohm Abyssal Plain. The ridge consists of anomalously thick oceanic crust that formed as a result of a major volcanic pulse during the Cretaceous.
