= Mount Temple Seamount =

Seamount offshore of Newfoundland and southwest of the Grand Banks

- Location within North Atlantic

Location
- Location: North Atlantic Ocean, 600 km (370 mi) southeast of Cape Race
- Group: Fogo Seamounts
- Coordinates: 41°32′N 51°09′W
- Country: Canada

Geology
- Type: Submarine volcano
- Age of rock: Early Cretaceous

Mount Temple Seamount, also known as Mount Temple Knoll, is an undersea mountain in the North Atlantic Ocean, located about 600 km (370 mi) southeast of Cape Race in Canadian waters off Atlantic Canada. It rises to a height of over 1,000 m (3,300 ft) and has an areal extent of 475 km^{2} (183 mi^{2}), making it larger than Quebec City and the Manitoban city of Winnipeg. Mount Temple Seamount and Carpathia Seamount about 90 km (56 mi) to the east are among the closest seamounts to the RMS Titanic wreck.

Mount Temple is one of the seven named Fogo Seamounts. Its name is derived from SS Mount Temple, a British steamship that traveled 4 hours in an attempt to participate in the rescue efforts following the Titanic disaster in 1912.
