= Dan van der Vat =

Daniel Francis Jeroen van der Vat (28 October 1939 – 9 May 2019) was a Dutch and British journalist, writer and military historian, with a focus on naval history.

Born in Alkmaar, North Holland, in the Netherlands, Van der Vat grew up in the German-occupied Netherlands. He attended the Cardinal Vaughan Memorial School in London and then was a student at St Cuthbert's Society, Durham University, from 1957 to 1960, graduating with a BA in classics.

He then became a graduate trainee on The Journal, a newspaper based in Newcastle-upon-Tyne, and later joined the Daily Mail in Manchester and returned to Newcastle as its regional chief reporter. He was recruited by The Sunday Times in 1965 and transferred to The Times in 1967. He was a foreign correspondent for ten years, opening The Times bureau in South Africa but was later expelled from the country after he had been described by the apartheid-era authorities as being a "pernicious liberal". Instead, he became the newspaper's bureau chief in Germany, but after Rupert Murdoch acquired The Times in 1981, he left and joined The Guardian the next year. He served as the publication's chief foreign leader-writer before he left the title in 1988 to write books. He continued to write obituaries for The Guardian.

== Selected works ==
- van der Vat, Dan (1983). The Last Corsair: The Story of the Emden. Birlinn Ltd. ISBN 1-84158-061-9. (published as Gentlemen of War, The Amazing Story of Captain Karl von Müller and the SMS Emden in the US)
- van der Vat, Dan (1988). Atlantic Campaign: World War II's Great Struggle at Sea (U.S. ed.). Harper & Row, Publishers, Inc. ISBN 0-06-015967-7.
- van der Vat, Dan (1991). The Pacific Campaign: The U.S.-Japanese naval war 1941-1945. Birlinn Ltd. ISBN 1-84158-123-2.
- van der Vat, Dan (1994). Stealth at Sea: The History of the Submarine. Weidenfeld & Nicolson. ISBN 0-297-81351-X.
- van der Vat (Co authored with Robin Gardiner), Dan (1995). The Riddle of the Titanic. Weidenfeld & Nicolson. ISBN 0-297-81528-8.
- van der Vat, Dan (1997). The Good Nazi: The Life and Lies of Albert Speer. George Weidenfeld & Nicolson. ISBN 0-297-81721-3.
- van der Vat, Dan (2000). Standard of Power. Hutchinson. ISBN 0-09-180121-4.
- van der Vat, Dan (2001). Pearl Harbor: The day of infamy-- An Illustrated History. Orion Publishing Co. ISBN 0-465-08983-6.
- van der Vat, Dan (2001). Atlantic Campaign: The Great Struggle at Sea 1939-1945. Birlinn Ltd. ISBN 1-84158-124-0.
- van der Vat, Dan (2002). The Grand Scuttle. Birlinn. ISBN 1-84341-000-1.
- van der Vat, Dan (2003). D-Day: The greatest invasion-- A people's history. ISBN 1-58234-314-4.
- van der Vat, Dan (2009). The Dardanelles Disaster - Winston Churchill's Greatest Failure. ISBN 978-0-7156-3716-6.
- van der Vat, Dan (2009). Eel Pie Island (with Michele Whitby). ISBN 978-0-7112-3053-8.
