= SS Mount Temple =

Passenger cargo steamship built in 1901

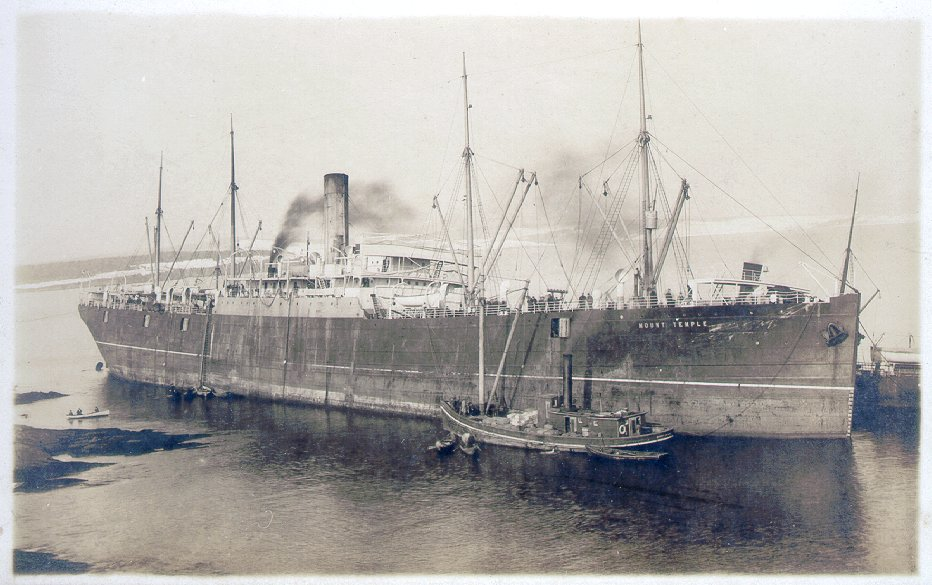
- Mount Temple aground at West Ironbound Island

History

United Kingdom
- Name: Mount Temple
- Namesake: Baron Mount Temple
- Owner: Elder, Dempster & Co Ltd (1901–1903); Canadian Pacific Railway (1903–1916)
- Port of registry: Liverpool
- Route: Liverpool–Montreal (1903); London–Antwerp–Montreal (summers); London–Halifax–Saint John (winters)
- Builder: Armstrong Whitworth & Co, Walker
- Yard number: 709
- Launched: 18 June 1901
- Sponsored by: Mrs. Swan
- Completed: 19 September 1901
- Maiden voyage: 19 September 1901
- In service: 1901–1916
- Out of service: 6 December 1916
- Home port: Liverpool
- Identification: UK official number 113496; code letters SPCJ; call sign MLQ
- Fate: Sunk by SMS Möwe, 6 December 1916

General characteristics
- Type: Passenger Cargo Ship
- Tonnage: 7,656 GRT (1901–1903); 4,989 NRT (1901–1903); 8,790 GRT (1903–1914); 6,661 NRT (1903–1914); 9,792 GRT (1914–1916); 7,556 NRT (1914–1916); 11,146 DWT
- Length: 485 ft 0 in (147.83 m)
- Beam: 59 ft 0 in (17.98 m)
- Depth: 30 ft 4 in (9.25 m)
- Installed power: 694 nhp
- Propulsion: 2 × Wallsend Slipway & Engineering Co 3-cylinder triple expansion engines; 2 × screws
- Speed: 12.0 knots (13.8 mph; 22.2 km/h)
- Capacity: 1,250 3rd-class and 14 cabin-class passengers
- Crew: 117
- Armament: 3-inch naval gun in WWI

Mount Temple was a passenger cargo steamship built in 1901 by Armstrong Whitworth & Company of Newcastle for Elder, Dempster & Co Ltd of Liverpool to operate as part of its Beaver Line. The ship was shortly afterwards acquired by the Canadian Pacific Railway. She was one of the first vessels to respond to the distress signals of RMS Titanic in 1912.

In 1916, while crossing the Atlantic with horses for the war effort and carrying a large number of newly collected dinosaur fossils (two of which were the hadrosaurs Corythosaurus), she was captured and scuttled complete with her cargo.

== Design and construction ==
Following acquisition of Beaver Line in 1899 and resolving all the legal questions surrounding it, Elder, Dempster placed an order for a vessel of about 11,000 tons deadweight (DWT) to run on this line between Liverpool, United Kingdom, and Canadian ports and New Orleans, Louisiana. Mount Temple was laid down at the Armstrong Whitworth & Company shipyard in Walker and launched on 18 June 1901 (yard number 709), with Mrs. Swan, the wife of Colonel Henry Frederick Swan, being the sponsor. At the time, she was the largest ship ever built at Low Walker Yard.

After successful completion of sea trials on 19 September 1901, in which the ship maintained an average speed of 11 1/2 knots (21.3 km/h; 13.2 mph) over several runs on the measured mile on the Tyne in very unfavorable weather, she was transferred to her owners and immediately departed for New Orleans. The vessel was constructed for general cargo trade, and had an iron shelter deck built over the whole length of the ship, good for about 1,100 heads of cattle. She also had all the modern machinery fitted for quick loading and unloading of the cargo. In addition, the ship was fitted with refrigerating machinery and insulated chambers to carry dairy produce and chilled meat.

As built, the ship was 485 feet 0 inches (147.83 m) long (between perpendiculars) and 59 feet 0 inches (17.98 m) abeam, a depth of 30 feet 4 inches (9.25 m). Mount Temple was originally assessed at 7,656 gross register tons (GRT) and 4,989 net register tons (NRT) and had deadweight of about 11,200. The vessel had a steel hull, and a pair of three-cylinder triple-expansion steam engine, with cylinders of 22-inch (56 cm), 37-inch (94 cm) and 61-inch (150 cm) diameter with a 48-inch (120 cm) stroke that drove two screw propellers. Between them the two engines were rated at a total of 694 nominal horsepower and gave the ship a speed of 12.0 knots (22.2 km/h; 13.8 mph).

The ship was named after William Francis Cowper, Baron Mount Temple, a British politician, Lord of the Admiralty and at the time, also a chairman of Armstrong Whitworth & Company.

== In the Imperial Government service ==
After delivery to her owners on 19 September, Mount Temple was chartered by the Imperial Government to transport remounts for the British Army fighting in South Africa in the Second Boer War. She departed for her maiden journey on the same day for New Orleans and arrived there on 9 October.

As the steamer entered the service late in 1901, she only made three trips in Admiralty service before the war ended at the end of May 1902. Following her last trip to South Africa she started her normal commercial service.

Remounts from North America carried by Mount Temple to South Africa in 1901–1902
Date of departure	Port of departure	Date of arrival	Port of arrival	No. of remounts embarked	Other cargo
5 November 1901	New Orleans	7 December 1901	Durban	1,100 horses	286 tons hay, 66 tons bran, 6,875 bushels oats, 1,571 bushels corn, 1,100 halters
4 February 1902	New Orleans	8 March 1902	Durban	1,100 horses	256 tons hay, 60 tons bran, 6,930 bushels oats, 1,600 bushels corn, 1,100 halters
30 April 1902	New Orleans	28 May 1902	Durban	1,100 horses	265 tons hay, 60 tons bran, 6,930 bushels oats, 1,600 bushels corn, 1,100 halters

== Elder, Dempster & Co ==
After the end of hostilities in South Africa Mount Temple sailed back to England and arrived at South Shields on 6 July 1902. She departed for her first commercial trip on 27 August for New Orleans in ballast and reached her destination on 15 September. There the vessel took on board a cargo consisting of cotton, wheat and lumber and left New Orleans on 1 October for Liverpool via Havre. While leaving the port, the steamer ran aground outside the South Pass, but was successfully refloated next day and continued her journey. The steamer conducted one more trip in November–December 1902 to Galveston, Texas, where the steamer loaded the port's third largest cargo of cotton at the time, and brought it back to Liverpool, and another one in January–February 1903 when she transported a large cargo of cotton, wheat and lumber from New Orleans to Havre.

On 24 February 1903, while Mount Temple was still en route, it was announced that the Canadian Pacific Railway acquired 14 steamers from Elder, Dempster Shipping, serving mostly on Beaver and Elder Lines, for £1,417,500.

== Service with Canadian Pacific Lines ==
After completing all the transfer requirement, Mount Temple was refitted to carry large number of passengers, and the Marconi Company equipped her for wireless telegraphy. Her call sign was "MLQ". Following the redesign, the vessel was also reassessed at 8,790 GRT and 6,661 NRT. Mount Temple departed Liverpool for her first voyage under new ownership on 12 May 1903 carrying 12 cabin and 1,200 steerage passengers for Quebec City and about 1,000 tons of general cargo for Montreal. She returned to Liverpool on 10 June with a cargo of 1,361 heads of cattle, wheat, hay and other produce. The steamer conducted five more runs between Liverpool and Montreal until the end of navigation season on the St. Lawrence River in November 1903, carrying general cargo and immigrants from Europe to Canada, and returning with cattle, foodstuffs and lumber. She was subsequently reassigned to the London–Antwerp–Canada route, serving Saint John and Halifax in winter seasons, and Montreal in summers. For example, on 18 April 1905 she brought in 1,922 immigrants to Saint John, the largest number brought by a single ship at the time, destined for settlement in Western Canada.

=== Stranding in 1907 ===
Mount Temple left Antwerp on 20 November 1907 on her usual route to Saint John, carrying around 6,000 tons of general cargo and 633 passengers. She was under command of Captain Boothby and had a crew of about 150. After passing Cape Pine, the captain took soundings in the morning of 1 December to ascertain the ship's position. By late afternoon the weather deteriorated, becoming overcast, with occasional snow squalls appearing. At around midnight, the captain retired leaving the watch to the second officer, Griffith Owen Lewis, with an order to call him if the weather worsened. Between 01:00 and 02:00 on 2 December, the vessel ran into a series of snow squalls which got progressively stronger and more persistent. At about 02:30 it started snowing heavily and visibility was reduced severely to only about half a length of the ship. About 02:35 the look-out reported a light ahead, which the second officer erroneously interpreted as another ship closing in. He ported the ship, and at 02:44 Mount Temple struck on the rocks of the West Ironbound Island. As the ship struck, the rocks pierced the steamer's hull right around the engine room flooding it and extinguishing the fires. A huge wave then smashed over the vessel, destroying about half of the lifeboats on board.

Several distress signals were made but due to rough weather no help could be dispatched until the next morning. At daylight it was observed that Mount Temple was on the ledges of the island and there were about 75 feet (23 m) between the steamer and the cliffs. Since it was unsafe to disembark the passengers down the sides of the ship into the waters, the crew managed to get the cable from the ship tied directly to the cliffs, and started transferring people in a basket tied to the cable. As the sea subsided, the lifeboats were employed to speed up the evacuation, and the help arrived in the form of several fishing vessels, schooners Hazel and Guide, and the tug Trusty. By about 17:00 on 3 December all passengers were successfully moved from the wrecked ship to the island, and 150 of them were taken to Bridgewater by Trusty. The rest of the passengers had to spend a night on the island, and were safely brought to Halifax the next day by the Canadian government steamer Lady Laurier.

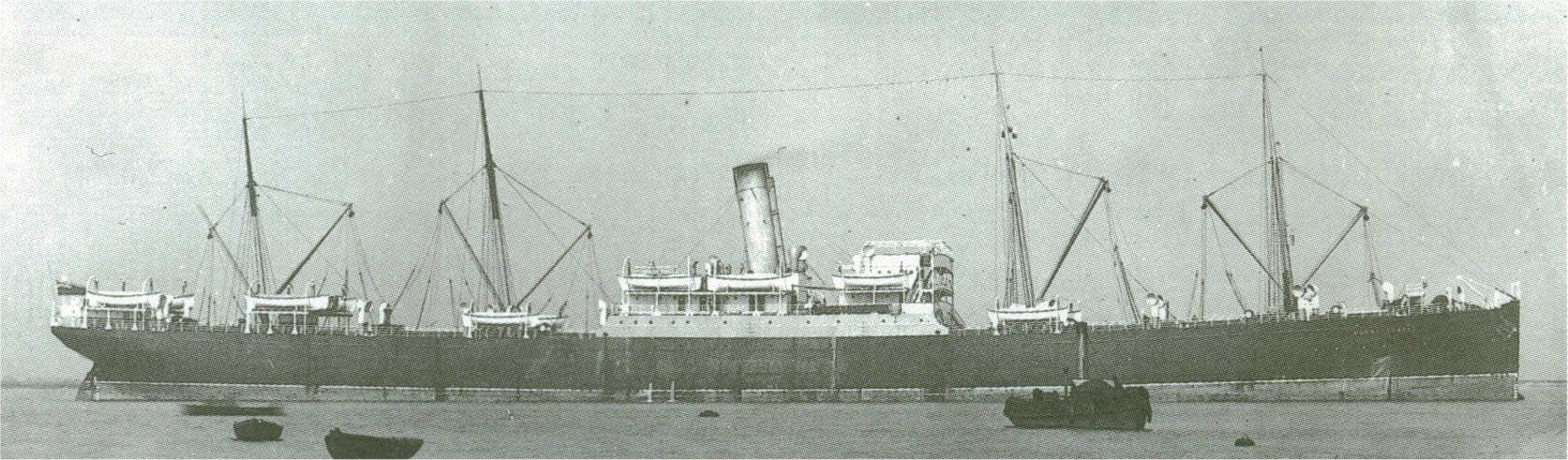
Mount Temple in Thames estuary, early 1900s

The ship was left stranded in a dangerous position and the chances of getting the vessel off were considered very slim, however, a new storm that hit the area on 6 December had shifted the steamer about twenty feet (6.1 m) closer to the island, and with that her position had markedly improved. Mount Temple had to spend the winter stranded, but was not damaged by the storms, and three attempts were made to float the steamer in February 1908, yet all of them proved to be unsuccessful. Finally, on 15 April 1908 the ship was successfully refloated and was able to proceed under her own steam to Lunenburg.

On 19 May 1908 it was reported that the repair contract was awarded to the Newport News Shipbuilding Co. and Mount Temple proceeded to Newport News, Virginia, from Halifax in tow on 22 May. The steamer sailed from Newport News on 22 August for Quebec City after almost three months of repairs, which cost Canadian Pacific about $140,000. Upon arrival she loaded her usual cargo and left 2 September for London, resuming her regular service.

On 14 October 1911 while entering Gravesend Mount Temple collided with an Australian steamer SS Osterley anchored at Tilbury Dock, causing some slight damage to her bow.

On 18 January 1912 Mount Temple on her trip from Halifax to London under command of Captain Moore encountered steamer SS Dart about 800 miles (1,300 km) east-northeast of Halifax, drifting helplessly with broken rudder. She spent the night standing by but did not connect the towing cables and abandoned Dart the next day.

=== Actions during the sinking of RMS Titanic ===
Mount Temple set out on her usual voyage at 14:00 on 3 April 1912 from Antwerp bound for Saint John, New Brunswick. The steamer was under the command of captain James Henry Moore and was carrying 1,466 passengers, mostly steerage, and a crew of 143. On the night of 14–15 April, Mount Temple's Marconi wireless operator, John Durrant, was about to sign off for the evening when at around 00:11 ship's time (22:25 New York Time) he picked up a distress signal from RMS Titanic, which was sinking after a collision with an iceberg. The message contained an erroneous distress position of 41°44′N 50°24′W. Durrant had the message relayed to the bridge by a steward, and acknowledged receipt of the signal to Titanic's wireless operator, Jack Phillips. Phillips had difficulty hearing the call from Durrant, however, because of the racket of steam which was then 'blowing off' from Titanic's funnels. Durrant made sure not to jam the ongoing exchange between Titanic and other ships, which he assumed to be closer to the scene. Ten minutes after the first distress call from Titanic was received (at 00:21 ship's time, 22:35 New York time), another message came in from Titanic with corrected distress coordinates: the position of 41°46′N 50°14′W. This position was 13 miles (21 km) west of where Titanic actually sank, as confirmed by the wreck's coordinates. (The center of Titanic's boiler field is located at 41°43.5′N 49°56.8′W)

When this message was received, Captain Moore was asleep. After being awakened, he assessed the situation carefully. He had standing orders to avoid icebergs, but after receiving the distress call he decided to mount a rescue operation. He immediately turned his ship around and steamed north-northeast at an estimated speed of 11 1/2 knots (21.3 km/h; 13.2 mph) towards Titanic's last reported position of 41°46′N 50°14′W. He consulted with his chief engineer, John Gillet, to try to coax even more speed out of the ageing vessel. Moore worked out his own rough position as 41°25′N 51°14′W, about 61 nautical miles (113 km; 70 mi) south and west from the now-established location of the wreck of the Titanic (41°43.5′N 49°56.8′W). Even at full speed, it would take around four hours to cover the distance between his ship and Titanic.

Once underway, Moore had his off-duty crew awakened and briefed and ordered the 20 lifeboats aboard uncovered. He had ropes and ladders readied, lifebelts prepared and posted extra lookouts to aid avoiding the icebergs reported in the area. Initial progress was good but after finding his ship coming upon a large ice field at around 03:00 on 15 April, the vessel slowed until becoming increasingly surrounded by pack ice. Around this time, Mount Temple encountered what was thought to be a schooner with just a single green light, which went unidentified and caused the ship to take evasive action. This green light may have been a rocket or flare launched by either survivors of the Titanic or launched by RMS Carpathia speeding to the rescue. With the amount of ice becoming ever greater, Mount Temple heaved-to around 14 nautical miles (26 km; 16 mi) short of Titanic's last reported position at around 03:25 and continued drifting through the ice field until the daybreak. She reached the last known position of Titanic around 04:30, and found herself in a heavily packed ice-field, but no trace of survivors or wreckage. After about half an hour wait, Moore proceeded south-southeast looking for an opening to pass through the pack ice, but eventually reversed course back to north-northwest, shadowing the western edge of the ice pack. Some time between 6:00 and 06:30 Carpathia, commanded by Captain Arthur Rostron, was sighted to the east of the vessel, and SS Californian was observed to the north cutting across the ice field from east to west. At 06:52, after the sunrise, Moore took prime vertical sight of the sun to determine his position and found out he was several miles east of Titanic's reported longitude and, using dead reckoning, concluded that her actual accident location to be about eight miles (13 km) further east, across the ice field in front of him.

Mount Temple sent a wireless request to Carpathia but received no answer. At around 08:30 Californian came along Carpathia as she was finishing picking up the last survivors. At 08:31 Carpathia reported picking up 20 boats, and sent another message at 09:26 telling everyone there was no more need to stand by, following which, Moore gave the order to reverse course and continue the voyage to New Brunswick. Once Mount Temple had docked at Saint John on 19 April, he was summoned to the American and later British inquests into the sinking.

As soon as Mount Temple reached Canada, she became the center of controversy as two passengers, and allegedly some crew members, stated that the ship was close to Titanic but failed to come to her rescue as they saw her distress rockets and even watched her sinking. These speculations were ignored by both the American and British inquiries, and none of Mount Temple's officers either testified or submitted affidavits in support of these claims. Captain Moore himself testified that no passenger could have witnessed an event such as rockets bursting over a ship since no passenger was on deck at 12 o'clock at night to be able to see it. Over the years, attempts have been made to stir up further controversy over Mount Temple's role in the sinking of the Titanic, often in a thinly veiled attempt to deflect blame and responsibility from the Leyland liner Californian, which was probably closer to the scene of the tragedy, and whose officers reported seeing a number of rockets bursting over an unidentified ship they were watching.

The controversy surrounding Mount Temple was further stirred up in November 2020 by the PBS program Abandoning the Titanic, part of the Secrets of the Dead series. Airing in some countries as Titanic: A Dead Reckoning, it was co-produced and co-written by journalist and Titanic author Senan Molony. The show repeated some old claims about Mount Temple and its role in the disaster, and made some new ones. Among these claims, it was said that Mount Temple was much closer to Titanic when the SOS was received, that Mount Temple approached to within five miles (8.0 km) of Titanic when Captain Moore decided to retreat after encountering the ice field in an attempt to avoid risk to his own ship, and that Mount Temple matched the appearance of the "mystery ship" that was being observed from Titanic because of the distance between her four masts, as later observed by the commander of the raider which sank Mount Temple in World War I. The show concluded that Californian's captain, Stanley Lord, was wrongly pilloried for failing to reach Titanic, when it was actually Mount Temple's Master who abandoned the doomed liner's passengers and crew to their fate.

This hypothesis, however, is strongly contested by historians. In January 2021, a well-known team of Titanic historians and authors released a rebuttal paper entitled: 'Abandoning the Titanic', Abandoning Reality: The Truth About the SS Mount Temple.' Although the new show attempts to discredit Captain Moore of Mount Temple and lays blame for "abandoning" Titanic and those aboard her to their fate, the historical record clearly proves otherwise. At a distance of 49.5 nautical miles (91.7 km; 57.0 mi) from the famous distress coordinates of Titanic, and roughly 60 miles (97 km) from the actual location of the disaster, Mount Temple was simply too far away to be seen from those aboard Titanic, and for those aboard Mount Temple to see Titanic or her distress rockets. Captain Moore and his crew made a desperate attempt to reach the stricken Titanic, but only reached the western side of the ice field that stood between her and the wreck site some 2 hours and 40 minutes after Titanic sank. There was no way that she could have reached Titanic in time to carry out a rescue; she did not 'abandon' Titanic.

Mount Temple Seamount, one of the Fogo Seamounts southeast of the Grand Banks of Newfoundland in the North Atlantic Ocean, is named after Mount Temple for her role in the sinking of the Titanic.

=== Grounding in 1913 ===
On 24 September 1913 Mount Temple left Montreal at 05:20 for her regular trip, carrying a large cargo of grain for London and general cargo for Antwerp. She was still under command of Captain Moore, and had a pilot on board. At the time of her departure, the weather was foggy. The vessel proceeded as far as the new drydock before changing her course too far south and subsequently ran aground opposite off Maisonneuve at 05:35 on the mud banks of Longueuil. Ten or eleven tugs were dispatched right away, but they could not refloat the ship. Attempts to refloat the ship continued the next day as the ship's general cargo was being partially discharged to lighten the ship, but they proved to be unsuccessful. As most of the cargo was taken out from the forward holds, the vessel stern sunk deeper into the mud, which prompted the rescuers to also unload the aft holds to even the ship. The ship was also taking on water indicating that some bottom plates were damaged in the grounding. The steamer was eventually floated in the morning of 26 September and was taken to dock where she had to unload her cargo of grain. The situation was somewhat exacerbated by the fact that Montreal had limited grain discharging equipment installed being a grain export port. Following the unloading of her cargo which took almost a week, Mount Temple was repaired and released from the drydock on 12 October.

==== War service ====
Mount Temple continued trading on her route all the way until Great Britain entered World War I on 2 August 1914. She arrived at London on 5 August with her usual cargo from Montreal, but on 12 August it was announced that the steamer was requisitioned together with many other large commercial vessels by the Admiralty to serve as a food and troop transport. In her transport capacity she sailed between England and France carrying troops and provision. For example, on 12–15 February 1915 Mount Temple carried 15th Battalion of the 48th Highlanders from Bristol to St Nazaire.

During the war she was defensively armed with a 3-inch (76 mm) naval gun on her stern.

In August 1915 it was announced that Allan Line Steamships and Canadian Pacific Railway had merged forming a new company named Canadian Pacific Ocean Services, Ltd. As a result, Mount Temple was released by the British Admiralty back to her commercial service in October 1915.

After the release, Mount Temple transported about 1,200 German prisoners of war (POWs) captured during the Battle of Loos from France to England before proceeding to Montreal, where she arrived on 28 October 1915.

== Sinking ==
Mount Temple departed Montreal for her final voyage on 3 December 1916 for Brest, and then continuing to Liverpool. The ship was under command of Captain Alfred Henry Sargent and had a crew of 109. The ship carried a cargo of 710 horses and 6,250 tons of goods, including 3,000 tons of wheat, 1,400 cases of eggs, and several thousand cases of apples among other things. Also on board were 22 wooden crates of dinosaur fossils, collected in the Badlands of Alberta by the American paleontologist Charles H. Sternberg. These were en route to Sir Arthur Smith Woodward, keeper of the British Museum's Natural History Department.

The ship was captured roughly 620 nautical miles (1,150 km; 710 mi) W1/2S off Fastnet early in the afternoon of 6 December 1916. SMS Möwe, outwardly a cargo ship, caught up with Mount Temple and fired a shot across her bow. After Mount Temple's gun crew manned the gun, Möwe fired back and with its superior firepower hit the funnel and the boat deck, silencing the gun. Three crew members aboard Mount Temple were killed in the brief battle. A fourth was wounded, and died a few days later aboard Möwe. Over a hundred crew and passengers were taken off the vessel before explosives were used to help scuttle her at about 18:00. On 12 December 1916, they were brought aboard the captured British ship Yarrowdale, and arrived at Swinemunde, Germany on 31 December. The US citizens among them were released in early March 1917 as the United States was neutral at the time. The others were interned as POWs.
