= Birma Seamount =

Seamount offshore of Newfoundland and southwest of the Grand Banks

- Location within North Atlantic

Location
- Location: North Atlantic Ocean, 650 km (400 mi) south of Cape Race
- Group: Fogo Seamounts
- Coordinates: 40°52′N 52°04′W
- Country: Canada

Geology
- Type: Submarine volcano
- Age of rock: Early Cretaceous

Birma Seamount, also known as Birma Knoll, is a undersea mountain in the North Atlantic Ocean, located about 650 km (400 mi) south of Cape Race in Canadian waters off Atlantic Canada. It has a height of over 1,800 m (5,900 ft), making Birma the tallest of the Fogo Seamounts. Its areal extent of 733 km^{2} (283 mi^{2}) is smaller than the Albertan city of Calgary. To the west, Birma Seamount is bounded by Algerine Seamount.

Birma Seamount is named after the SS Birma, a Russian steamship that responded to the RMS Titanic's distress signal following her collision with an iceberg on 15 April 1912.
