= Rudolf von Willemoes-Suhm =

German naturalist (1847-1875)

Rudolf von Willemoes-Suhm (11 September 1847 – 13 September 1875) was a German naturalist who served aboard the Challenger expedition.

Willemoes-Suhm was born in Glückstadt, Duchy of Holstein. After starting to study law at the University of Bonn, he left Bonn to study zoology at the Ludwig-Maximilians-Universität München under Professor Karl von Siebold. Beginning in April 1869, he studied at the University of Göttingen, and obtained his doctorate there. In 1870, he moved to Kiel University, where he met Professor Karl von Kupffer, and there he collected specimens in the Bay of Kiel, which he analysed for his habilitation. In 1871, Willemoes-Suhm began to lecture at the Ludwig-Maximilians-Universität München. In 1872, he was on board the Phønix with the Danish Faeroer Expedition, and described the vertebrates and polychaetes of the Faroe Islands. The Phønix docked in Leith, and while in Edinburgh, Willemoes-Suhm met Charles Wyville Thomson, who would lead the Challenger expedition later that year.

Willemoes-Suhm joined the Challenger expedition at the last minute, and worked on many of the crustaceans that voyage discovered. He died on 13 September 1875, during the journey from Hawaii to Tahiti, and was buried at sea after a short illness with erysipelas. The genus Willemoesia is named after him, as is Suhm Island in Royal Sound (Kerguelen Archipelago), which was first charted on the voyage of the H.M.S. Challenger, and the Sohm Abyssal Plain in the North Atlantic Ocean. He was awarded the Challenger Medal posthumously.

== See also ==
- European and American voyages of scientific exploration
