= CS Mackay-Bennett =

British cable-laying ship, 1884-1922

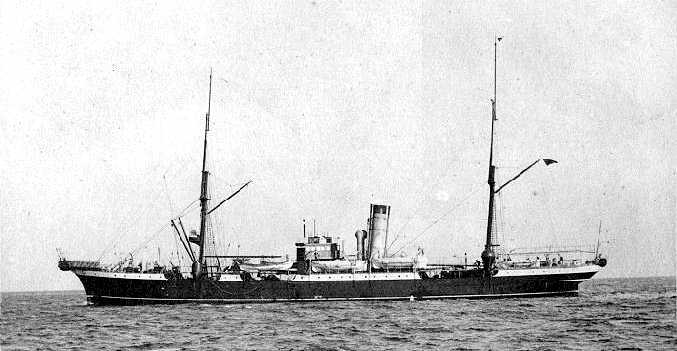
- CS Mackay-Bennett around 1900

History

United Kingdom
- Name: Mackay-Bennett
- Namesake: John Mackay & Gordon Bennett
- Operator: Commercial Cable Company
- Port of registry: London, England
- Builder: John Elder & Co., Glasgow
- Launched: September 1884
- In service: 1884-1922
- Out of service: May 1922
- Home port: Halifax, Nova Scotia / Plymouth, England
- Fate: Storage hulk, May 1922; Scrapped, 1965

General characteristics
- Type: Cable ship
- Tonnage: 2,000 gross register tons (GRT)
- Length: 270 ft (82 m) o/a; 250 ft (76 m) p/p
- Beam: 40 ft (12 m)
- Depth: 24 ft 6 in (7.47 m) moulded
- Propulsion: 2 × Compound inverted 2-cylinder engines; 2 × Cylindrical single-ended multi-tubular boilers

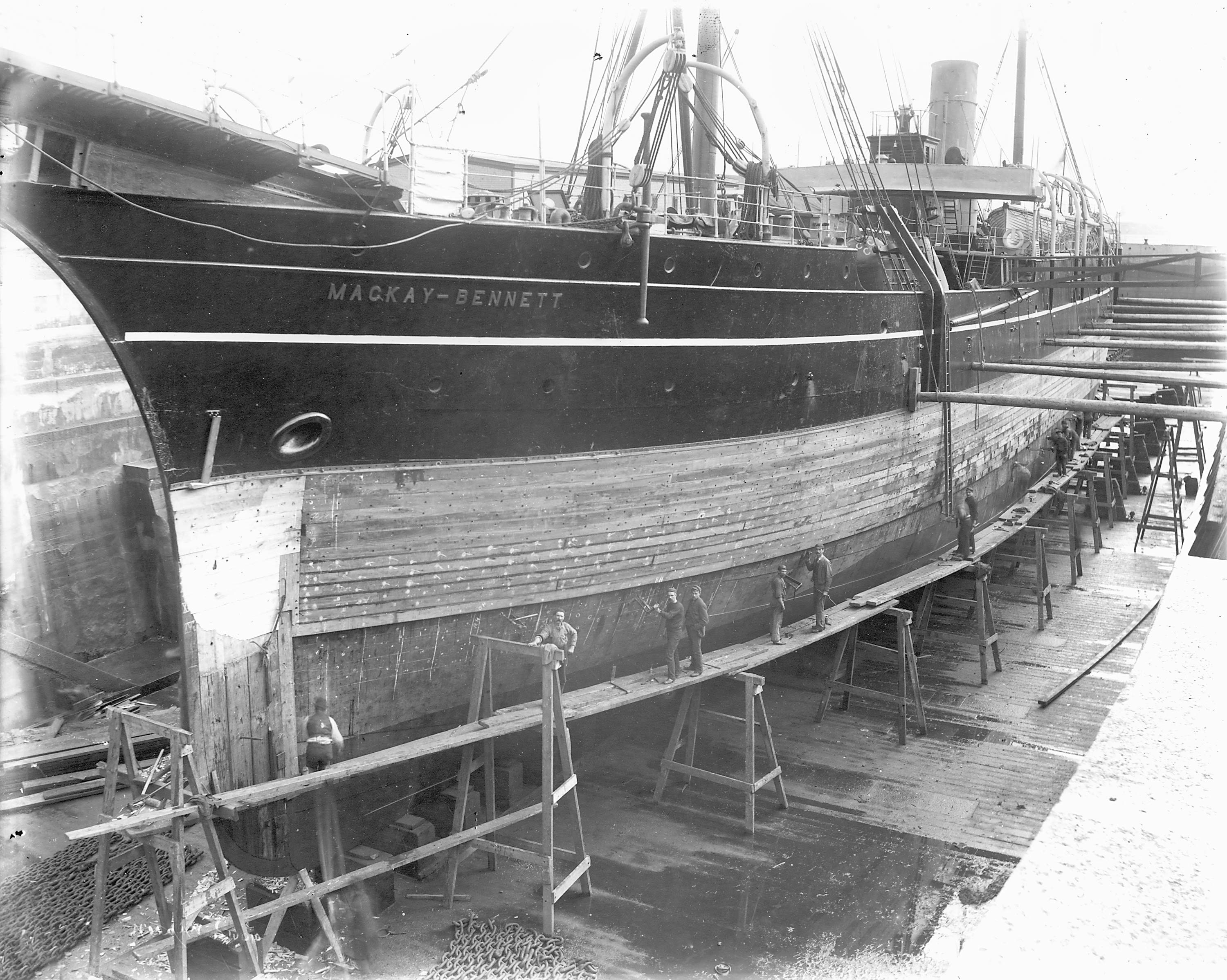
CS Mackay-Bennett in Dry Dock at Halifax, Nova Scotia

The Cable Ship Mackay-Bennett was a transatlantic cable-laying and cable-repair ship registered at Lloyd's of London as a Glasgow vessel but owned by the American Commercial Cable Company. She is notable for being the ship that recovered the majority of the bodies after the sinking of the Titanic.

== Design and build ==
The ship was commissioned by the USA-based Commercial Cable Company from then noted River Clyde-based warship builders John Elder & Co. at their Fairfield Yards. The company incorporated a number of then new and original features into the cable ship. It was one of the first ships built from steel rather than iron, and she had a relatively deep keel design to both accommodate as much cable as possible and to keep the ship stable in the Atlantic Ocean swells. The design was also very hydrodynamic to keep her fuel efficient and fast in operation. The hull design included bilge keels to keep her stable, and she had two rudders, one fore and one aft, to maximize manoeuvrability.

== Operations ==
Named for two founders of the Commercial Cable Company, John W. MacKay and James G. Bennett, she was launched late in 1884. Mainly based in Halifax, Nova Scotia, where she first arrived in March 1885, she was also often used for operations on the European side of the Atlantic, based out of Plymouth, England. The Canadian author Thomas Raddall worked as wireless operator aboard Mackay-Bennett and based some short stories on his experiences aboard.

In addition to carrying out numerous difficult cable repairs, many during times of wartime danger, due to the nature of her work and resultant position in the Atlantic, Mackay-Bennett performed many rescues. Typical was the rescue of the crew of the sinking schooner Caledonia on 12 February 1912.

=== Recovery of bodies ===
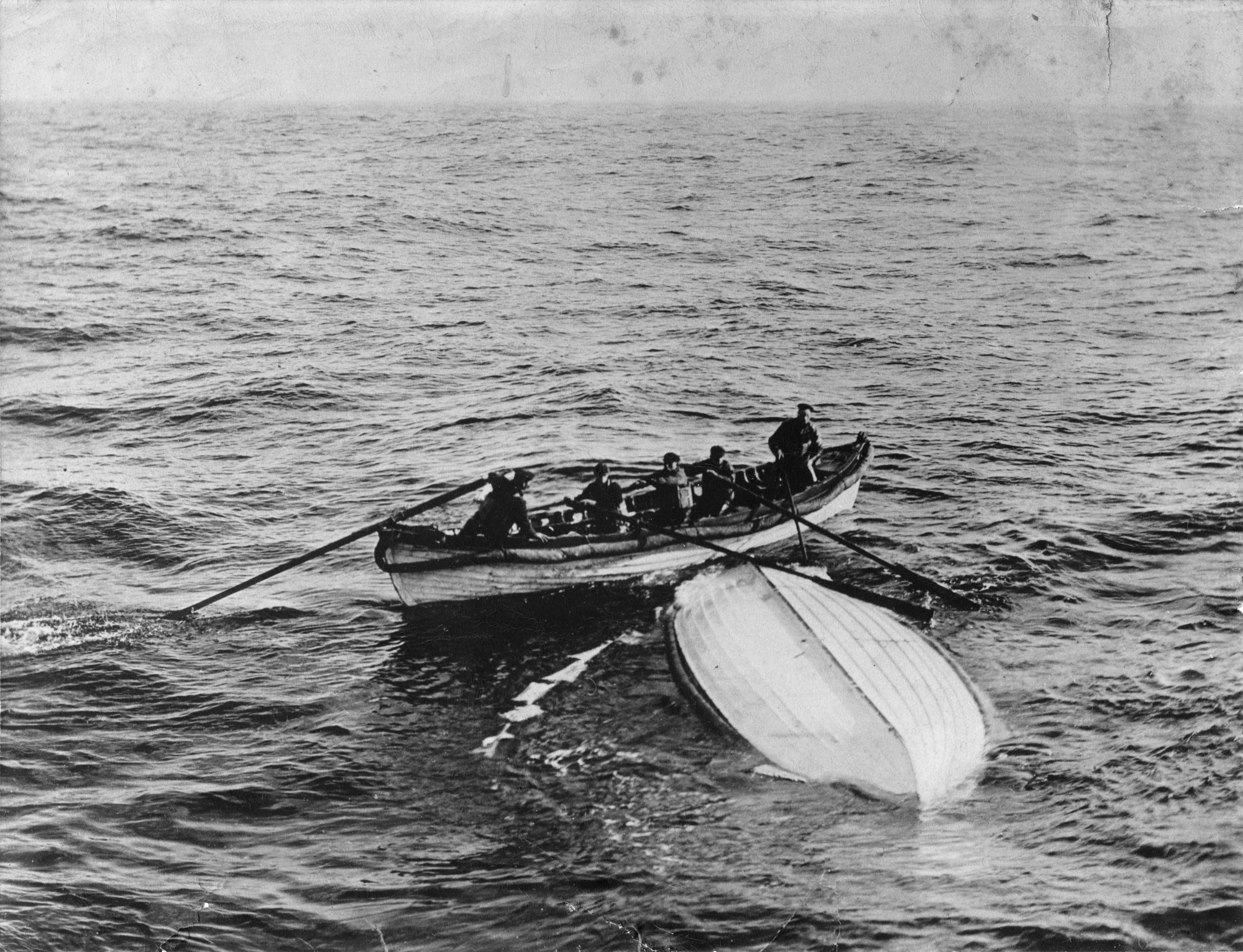
Collapsible Boat B of the Titanic, found adrift by the Mackay-Bennett during its mission to recover the bodies of those who died in the disaster. It was abandoned after an attempt to bring it on board failed.

In April 1912, she was berthed at Halifax during a period of long-term work maintaining the France-to-Canada communications cable. Of the three ships in Halifax at that time only Mackay-Bennett had a hold capable of holding the 125 coffins and ice forming part of the exercise to recover bodies. The ship became notable as the main vessel contracted by the White Star Line to carry out the difficult task of recovering the bodies left floating in the North Atlantic, after the Titanic disaster. The task was further motivated by Vincent Astor's announcement of a $100,000 reward for the ship recovering the body of his father J. J. Astor. Her captain, Frederick H. Larnder, took on board a combination of specialists and an effective mobile mortuary. Both additional and specialized personnel and supplies were taken on board for the assignment. These included:

- Canon Kenneth Cameron Hind of All Saints Cathedral, Halifax
- John R. Snow, Jr., the chief embalmer with the firm of John Snow & Co., the province of Nova Scotia's largest undertaking firm, hired by White Star to oversee the embalming arrangements
- Sufficient embalming supplies to handle 70 bodies
- 100 coffins
- 100 long tons (100 t) of ice, in which to store the recovered bodies

Crew were paid double pay for the grisly task. There was a hierarchy to the mortuary details as the ship could never hope to bring all back: first class passengers were embalmed and placed in coffins; second-class were wrapped in linen winding sheets; third class and crew bodies were weighted and buried at sea (116 in total, 60 of which were unidentified).

The ship left Halifax at 12:45 P.M. on Wednesday, 17 April 1912. Due to severe fog and rough seas it took the ship nearly four days to sail the 800 nautical miles (1,500 km; 920 mi) to the scene of the disaster. The captain instructed the ship's crew to keep their logbooks complete and up to date during the voyage and subsequent recovery operation, but only two logbooks are presently known to have survived: seven pages from the logbook of engineer Frederick A. Hamilton, now kept in the National Maritime Museum, England, and the personal diary of Clifford Crease, a 24-year-old Naval artificer (craftsman-in-training); much of the detailed account of the recovery operation is today traced to Crease's diary, now held in the Public Archives of Nova Scotia.

The ship arrived at the scene during the night, so recovery of bodies began at 06:00 on 20 April. CS Mackay-Bennett was anchored close to but not within the recovery area, using her sea anchor to stay with the drifting bodies and wreckage, and she offloaded her skiff lifeboats. Crews then rowed into the recovery area and manually recovered the bodies into the skiffs. After recovering as many bodies as they deemed safe for the return journey (51 corpses), the crews then rowed back to the CS Mackay-Bennett. The captain noted that there was neither sufficient space aboard to store all of the recovered bodies nor enough embalming supplies aboard. As the Canadian Government and associated burial and maritime laws directed that any bodies carried had to be embalmed before a ship enter a Canadian port, the captain agreed to a system whereby:

- First-class passengers were embalmed, placed in coffins, and stored in the rear cable locker. These included the bodies of: John Jacob Astor IV, the richest man aboard, body No.124 recovered on 22 April, identified by his unique diamond finger ring and the initials sewn on the label of his jacket; architect Edward Austin Kent, body No.258; and Isidor Straus, owner of Macy's Department Store.
- Second-class passengers were embalmed, wrapped in canvas, and stored in the forward cable locker.
- Third-class passengers and crew were buried at sea, a total of 116 bodies. In October 2013, a photograph taken by Fourth officer R. D. "Westy" Legate came up for auction, which captured the Canon ministering over a ceremony of multiple burials at sea on board the ship.
- The body of band leader Wallace Hartley, found fully dressed with his music case strapped to his body, was transferred to the Arabic and returned to England, where on 18 May he was buried in Keighley Road Cemetery, Colne, Lancashire.
- The body of 19-month old Sidney Leslie Goodwin (known until 2008 only as "The Unknown Child"), a third-class passenger and the fourth body recovered, was saved by the crew and stored in the hold.

At 19:00 on 23 April, CS Mackay-Bennett lay briefly alongside the Allan Shipping Line's Sardinian (en route to Saint John, New Brunswick), to collect additional canvas.

Just after midnight on 26 April, CS Mackay-Bennett rendezvoused with the Anglo-American Telegraph Company's CS Minia to get extra embalming supplies, before departing for Halifax at dawn that day.

After a seven-day recovery operation, the CS Mackay-Bennett had:

- Recovered 306 of the 328 bodies found from among the 1,517 who perished aboard Titanic
- Buried 116 at sea, of which only 56 were identified
- Set sail for home with 190 bodies on board, almost twice as many as there were coffins available
- Arrived in Halifax on 30 April 1912, began unloading her cargo at 09:30, and transferred the bodies to the ice rink of the Mayflower Curling Club.

The crew split the $100,000 reward for Astor's body (around $2500 each). Using some of that money they paid for the burial of the body of the unknown child and his headstone monument - the casket was marked by a copper plaque reading "Our Babe". The entire ship's crew, together with the majority of the population of Halifax, attended the child's burial at Fairview Lawn Cemetery on 4 May 1912. With improved DNA testing, on 30 July 2007 Canadian researchers at Lakehead University announced that testing of the body's mitochondrial DNA had revealed that the child was 19-month-old Sidney Leslie Goodwin.

After his death in 1961, Clifford Crease's body was interred only a few steps away from the grave of "Our Babe", a site he had visited on every anniversary of the tragedy during his lifetime.

Mackay-Bennett Seamount, one of the Fogo Seamounts southeast of the Grand Banks of Newfoundland in the North Atlantic Ocean, is named after Mackay-Bennett for her involvement in the Titanic disaster.

== Retirement and scrapping ==
The ship was retired in May 1922, anchored in Plymouth Sound to be used as a storage hulk. During The Blitz on England in World War II, she was sunk during a Nazi Germany Luftwaffe attack but later refloated. Her hull was finally scrapped in 1965.
