= Frankford =

Frankford may refer to:

- Frankford, Tasmania, Australia
- Frankford, Ontario, Canada

== United States ==
- Frankford, Delaware
- Frankford, Baltimore, Maryland
- Frankford Township, Mower County, Minnesota
  - Frankford Village, Minnesota, a ghost town which was in this township
- Frankford, Missouri
- Frankford Township, New Jersey
- Frankford, Philadelphia, Pennsylvania
- Frankford, West Virginia

== See also ==
- Frankfort (disambiguation)
- Frankfurt (disambiguation)
- Frank Forde (1890–1983), Australian politician
