= RMS Carpathia =

Ocean liner known for rescuing survivors of RMS Titanic

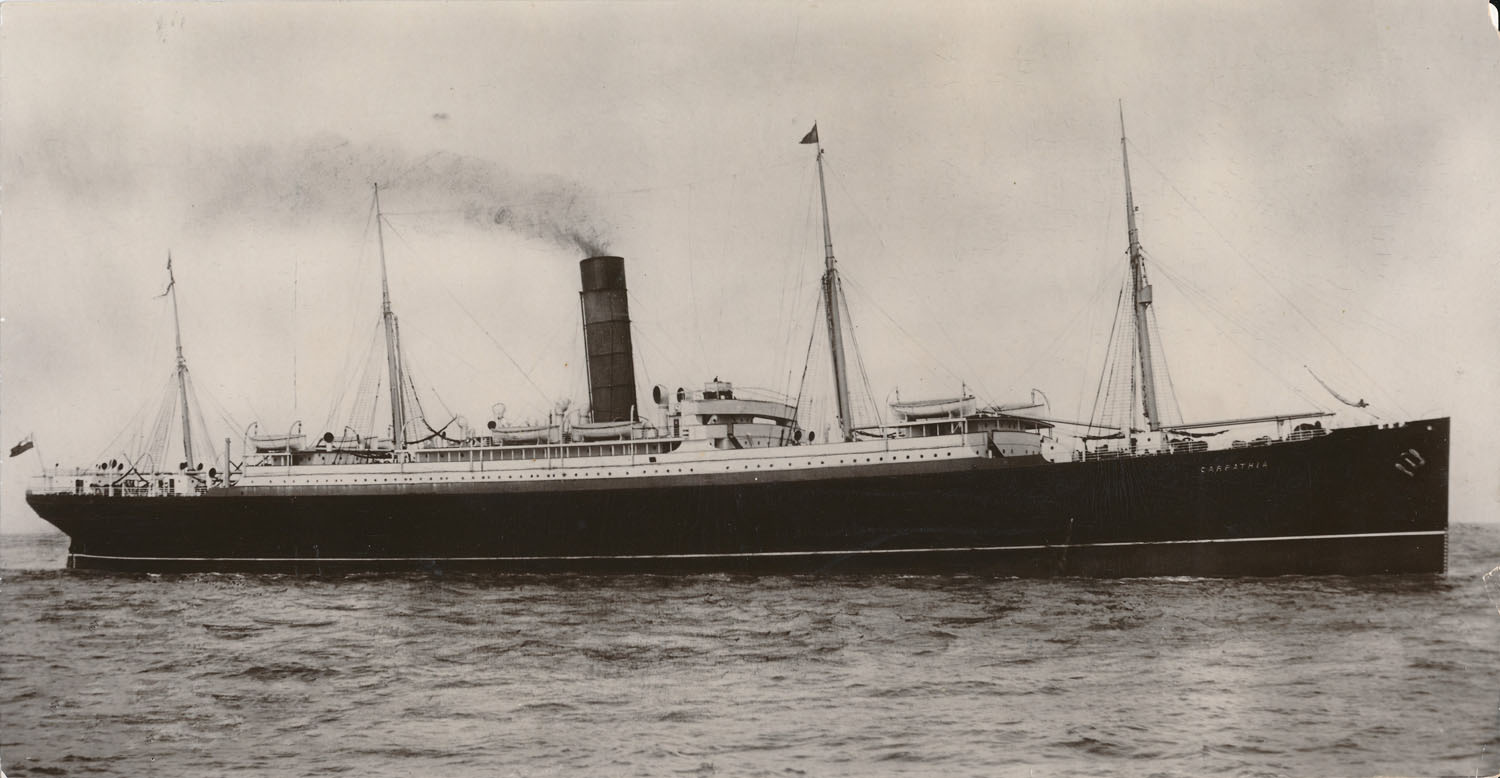
- RMS Carpathia under way

History

United Kingdom
- Name: RMS Carpathia
- Namesake: Carpathian Mountain Range
- Owner: Cunard Line
- Operator: Cunard Line
- Port of registry: Liverpool, United Kingdom
- Route: Transatlantic: Liverpool–Queenstown–Boston; Transferred to Liverpool–Queenstown–New York summers; Trieste–Fiume–New York winters
- Builder: C.S. Swan & Hunter, Wallsend, England
- Yard number: 274
- Laid down: 10 September 1901
- Launched: 6 August 1902
- Completed: February 1903
- Maiden voyage: 5 May 1903
- In service: 1903–1918
- Out of service: 17 July 1918
- Identification: UK Official Number 118014; Radio Call sign "MPA"
- Fate: Torpedoed and sunk on 17 July 1918
- Notes: Rescued all survivors from the sinking of RMS Titanic in 1912

General characteristics
- Type: Ocean liner
- Tonnage: 13,603 GRT, 8,660 NRT
- Length: 558 ft (170 m)
- Beam: 64 ft 6 in (19.66 m)
- Draught: 34 ft 7 in (10.54 m)
- Decks: 7
- Propulsion: 2 × Wallsend Slipway Co. quadruple expansion steam engines; Twin propellers
- Speed: 14 knots (26 km/h; 16 mph) (service)
- Capacity: 1,800 passengers: 1st-class: 100; 2nd-class: 200; 3rd-class: 1,500
- Notes: Half-sister to RMS Ivernia (1899); Half-sister to RMS Saxonia (1899)

RMS Carpathia was a Cunard Line transatlantic passenger steamship built by C. S. Swan & Hunter in their shipyard in Wallsend, England.

Carpathia made her maiden voyage in 1903 from Liverpool to Boston, and continued on this route before being transferred to Mediterranean service in 1904. In April 1912, she became famous for rescuing survivors of the rival White Star Line's RMS Titanic after it struck an iceberg and sank in the North Atlantic Ocean. Carpathia navigated the ice fields to arrive two hours after Titanic had sunk, and the crew rescued 712 survivors from the ship's lifeboats.

RMS Carpathia was sunk on 17 July 1918 during the First World War after being torpedoed three times by the German submarine U-55 off the southern Irish coast, with the loss of five crew members.

The name of the ship comes from the Central European mountain range, the Carpathians.

== Background ==
Around 1900, the Cunard Line faced stiff competition from the British White Star Line and the German lines Norddeutscher Lloyd (North German Lloyd) and Hamburg America Line (HAPAG). Cunard's largest liners as of 1898, RMS Campania and RMS Lucania, had a reputation for size and speed, both being of 12,950 gross register tons (GRT) and having held the "Blue Riband" for the fastest crossing of the Atlantic Ocean. However, Norddeutscher Lloyd's new liner SS Kaiser Wilhelm der Große had taken the Blue Riband from them in 1897, while the White Star Line was planning to place a new 17,000-GRT liner, RMS Oceanic, into service. Cunard also upgraded its fleet during this time, ordering the construction of three new liners, SS Ivernia, Saxonia, and Carpathia.

Rather than attempting to fully regain prestige by spending the additional money necessary to order liners that were fast enough to win back the Blue Riband from the German Kaiser Wilhelm der Grosse or large enough to rival Oceanic in size, Cunard tried to maximize their profitability in order to remain solvent enough to fend off any takeover attempts by the competing shipping conglomerate by the name of International Mercantile Marine Co.

The three new ships were not particularly fast, as they were designed for immigrant travellers, but provided significant cost savings in fuel economy. The three ships became both instruments and models through which Cunard was able to successfully compete with its larger rivals, most notably IMM's lead company, the White Star Line.

Carpathia was a modified design of the Ivernia-class ships, being approximately 40 feet (12 m) shorter than her "half-sisters". Like her predecessors, her design was based on a long hull, a low, well-balanced superstructure, and four masts fitted with cranes, allowing for effective handling of larger amounts of cargo than was customary on an ocean liner.

=== Design and construction ===
RMS Carpathia was constructed by C. S. Swan & Hunter at their shipyard in Wallsend, England for the Cunard Steamship Company, to operate between Liverpool and Boston alongside Ivernia and Saxonia. Her keel was laid down on 10 September 1901, and she was launched on 6 August 1902, when she was christened by Miss Watson, daughter of the vice-chairman of the Cunard line. She underwent her sea trials on a voyage from the River Tyne to the River Mersey between 22 and 25 April 1903.

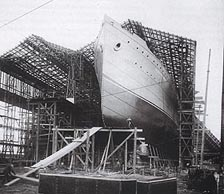
Carpathia before her launch

At the time of her launch, she was described as being 558 ft (170 m) long, 64 ft 3 in (19.58 m) breadth, with a gross register tonnage of 12,900 tons. When Carpathia was finally completed, her gross register tonnage had increased to more than 13,500 tons. She was designed with four complete steel decks, a steel orlop deck in holds No. 1 and 2, and a bridge deck 290 ft. long for passengers, the saloon, and cabins, with a boat deck located right above the bridge deck. At the time she was launched, it was said that she was to be fitted for carrying 200 first-class and 600 third-class passengers and large quantities of frozen meat. When she was finally completed, her capacity had increased to about 1,700 passengers.

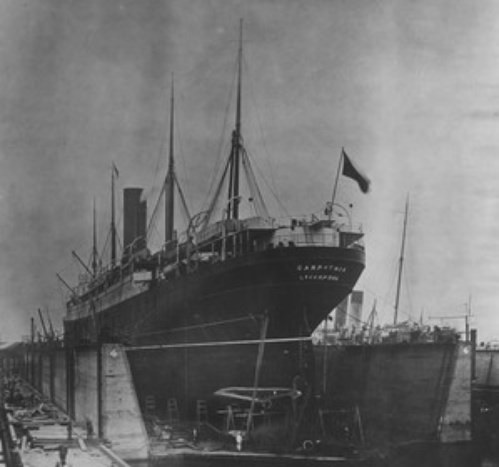
Carpathia being drydocked in Red Hook, New York

Despite being an intermediate liner designed mainly for second and third-class travellers, Carpathia's interior accommodations were still quite comfortable and set a standard for the era. The dining saloon was described as decorated in cream and gold, which "combine effectively with the rich upholstery and mahogany of the furniture, and old gold curtains screening the ports", and was capped by a stained-glass dome underneath an electrical fan for ventilation. The second-class accommodation also included a walnut-panelled smoking room located in the aft deckhouse and a handsome library at the forward end of the bridge (A) deck. After the 1905 renovation, these spaces would be converted to first-class accommodations. Third-class accommodations on Carpathia were extraordinarily generous for the time. The third-class dining saloon extended the full width of the ship and seated 300 passengers, with walls panelled in polished oak and teak dado. Third-class also included a smoking room and ladies' room located immediately forward of the dining saloon on the upper (C) deck, adjacent to the enclosed promenade (or open space) similar to the design on Ivernia and Saxonia. Officers were berthed in the forward deckhouse on the bridge (A) deck, above the second-class dining saloon, while the captain's quarters was located on the boat deck immediately below the ship's bridge.

Carpathia's lower decks were well-ventilated by means of deck ventilators, supplemented by electric fans. The ventilation systems were designed to force fresh air over coiled thermotanks, which could be fed with cool water during the summer or steam during the winter, thus heating and cooling the ship as conditions warranted. Although the ship was fully electrified with over 2,000 lamps, the ship still had backup oil lamps in the cabins when she entered service, in the event that an electrical outage were to occur.

Carpathia had seven single-ended boilers, fitted with the Howden forced draught system, working at 210 psi (1,400 kPa), which fed two independent sets of four-cylinder, four-crank, quadruple expansion engines, built by the Wallsend Slipway and Engineering Company, Ltd. of Wallsend, England with cylinders of: 26 in (0.66 m), 37 in (0.94 m), 53 in (1.3 m), and 76 in (1.9 m), with a stroke of 54 in (1.4 m). The engine power available allowed for an intended trial speed of 15.5 kn (17.8 mph; 28.7 km/h).

Carpathia made her maiden voyage on 5 May 1903 from Liverpool, England, to Boston, Massachusetts in the US, and ran services between New York City and Mediterranean ports, such as Gibraltar, Algiers, Genoa, Naples, Trieste and Fiume.

== Early service and renovations ==
Although lacking the speed and grand luxury of express liners, and having no first-class accommodations until 1905, Carpathia quickly developed a reputation as a comfortable ship, particularly in rough weather, due to her relatively wide breadth to length ratio, the use of bilge keels, and the lack of vibration typically found in powerful engines. The ship became popular with both tourists and emigrants. During the summer season, Carpathia operated mainly between Liverpool and New York City, and in the winter, Carpathia travelled from New York City to the Mediterranean Basin.

After Cunard partnered with the Royal Hungarian Sea Navigation Company Adria in 1904, Carpathia was designated with the duty of transporting Hungarian emigrants. As a result, Carpathia was renovated in 1905, increasing its capacity from 1,700 passengers to 2,550 passengers. Mainly third-class small cabins were converted to large shared dormitory rooms while adding first-class accommodation to areas that were previously second-class. By 1912, her tonnage had grown to 13,600 and she had a capacity of 2,450 passengers, with 250 being first and second-class passengers, and 2,200 being third-class passengers. She had a crew in 1912 of about 300 members, including 6 officers. She carried 20 lifeboats.

== Sinking of RMS Titanic and Carpathia's rescue of survivors ==
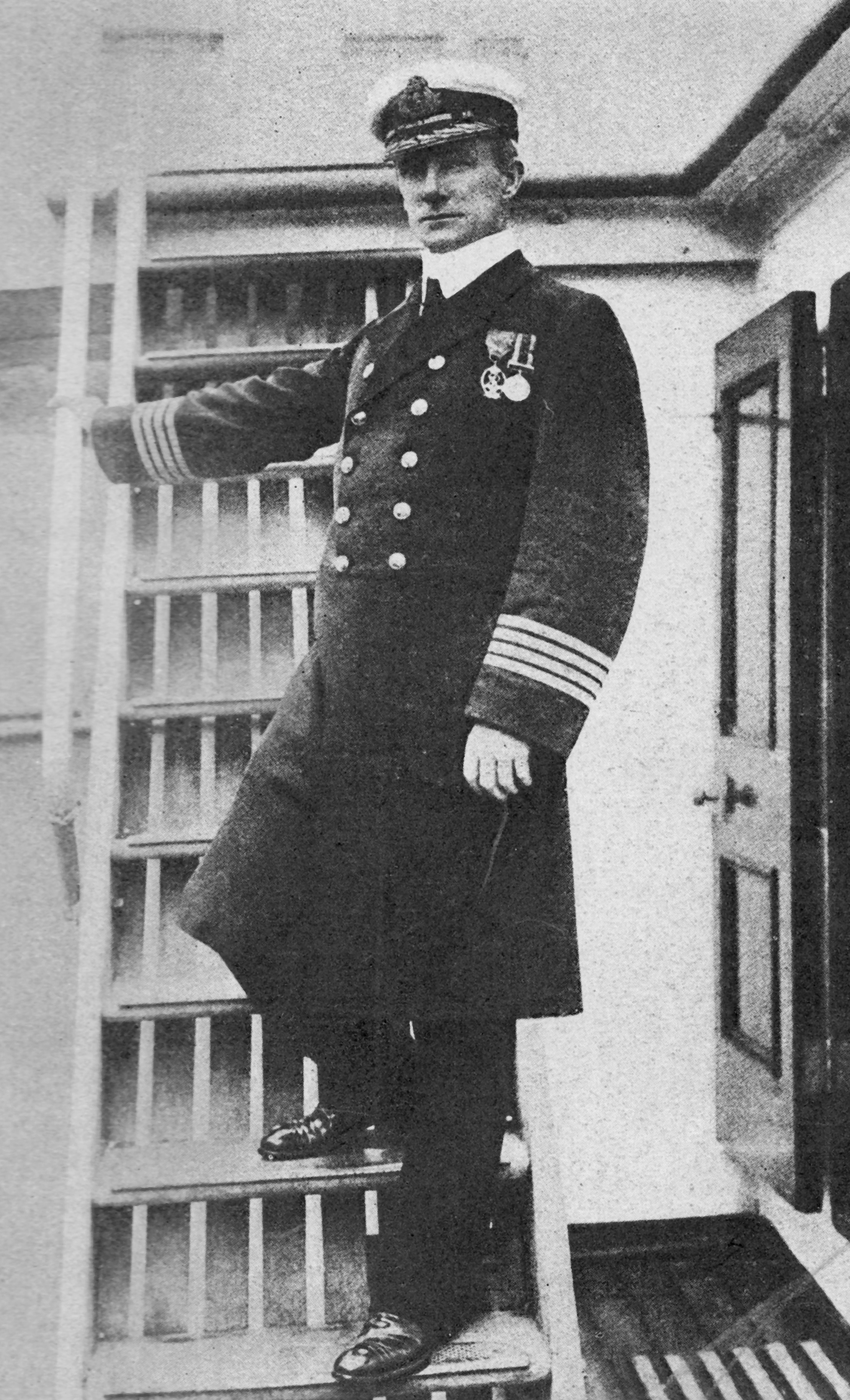
Captain Arthur Rostron. Under his command, Carpathia responded to Titanic's distress call and rescued survivors.

Carpathia departed from New York City on 11 April 1912 bound for Fiume, Austria-Hungary (now Rijeka, Croatia). At that moment on the ship were about 240 crew members, of which a quarter were Croatian sailors. She carried 128 passengers in first class, 50 in second class and 565 in third class. Among its passengers were the American painters Colin Campbell Cooper and his wife Emma, author Philip Mauro, journalists Lewis Palmer Skidmore and Carlos Fayette Hurd, with their wives Emily Vinton Skidmore and Katherine Cordell Hurd, Dr. Frank Hamlin Blackmarr who attended to the survivors and sent the first detailed reports about them, and Charles H. Marshall, whose three nieces were travelling onboard Titanic. Also on board were Hope Brown Chapin, honeymooning youngest daughter of the former Governor of Rhode Island, Russell Brown, Pittsburgh architect Charles M. Hutchison and his wife, Sue Eva Rule, the sister of Judge Virgil Rule of the St. Louis Court of Appeals, as well as Louis Mansfield Ogden with his wife Augusta Davies Ogden, a granddaughter of Alexander H. Rice.

On the night of 14 April, Carpathia's wireless operator, Harold Cottam, had missed previous messages from Titanic, as he was on the bridge at the time. After his shift ended at midnight, he continued listening to the transmitter before bed, and received messages from Cape Cod, Massachusetts, stating they had private traffic for Titanic. He thought he would be helpful, and at 12:11 a.m. on the morning of 15 April, sent a message to Titanic, stating that Cape Cod had traffic for them. In reply he received Titanic's distress signal, stating that they had struck an iceberg and were in need of immediate and urgent assistance.

Cottam took the message and coordinates to the bridge, to the officer of the watch, First Officer Horace Dean. Along with Dean, Cottam rushed down the ladder to the captain's cabin and awakened Captain Arthur Henry Rostron, who immediately gave the order to turn the ship around, and then asked Harold Cottam if he was absolutely certain it was a distress signal from Titanic. Cottam said that he had indeed received a distress signal from Titanic, which required immediate assistance, and Cottam gave Titanic's position, saying that he was absolutely certain of the seriousness of the message. Whilst dressing, Rostron set a course for Titanic, and sent for the chief engineer and told him to "call another watch of stokers and make all possible speed to Titanic, as she was in trouble." Rostron later testified that the distance to Titanic was 58.22 nmi (67.00 mi; 107.82 km), and it took Carpathia three and a half hours to arrive at Titanic's location, by which time she had already sunk.

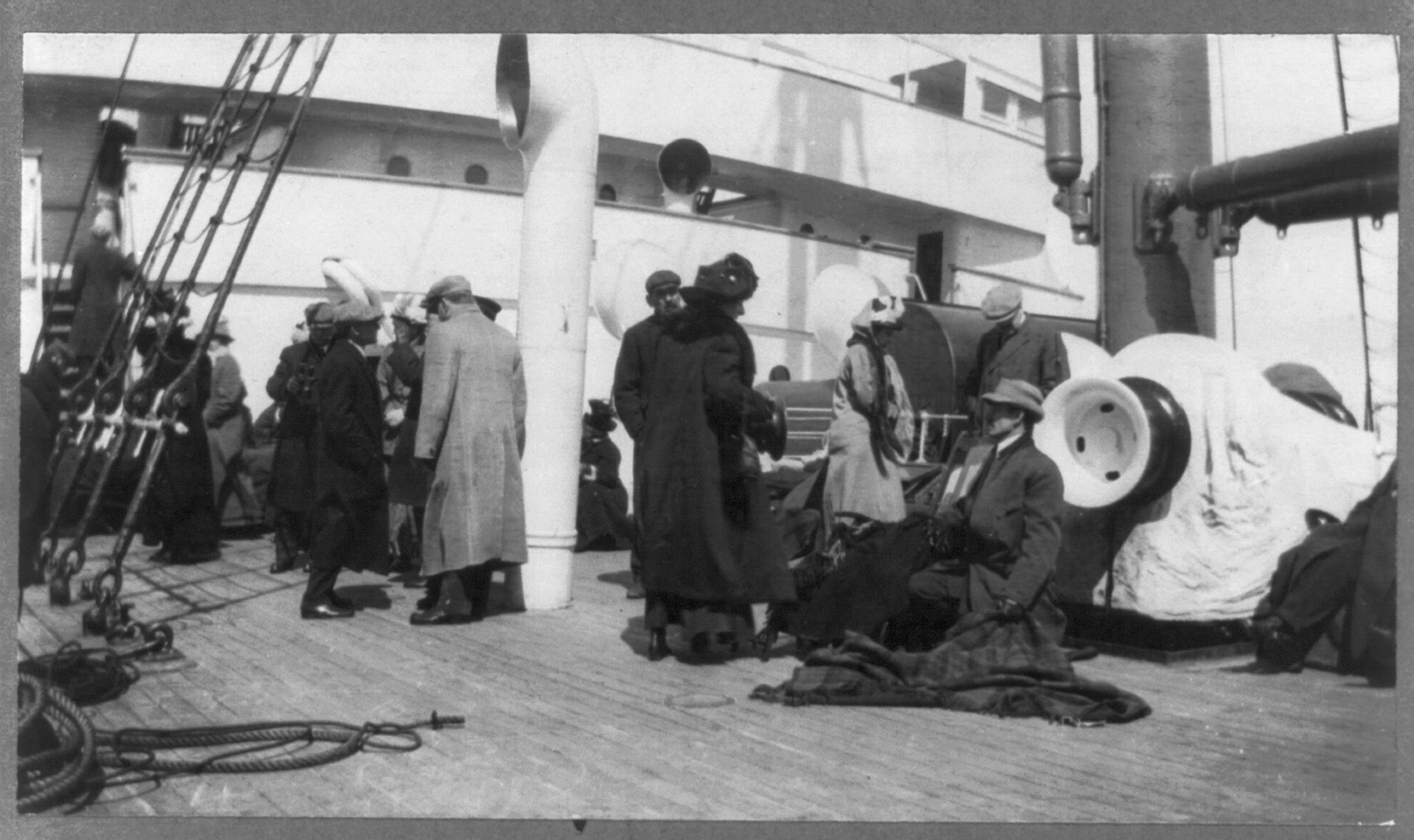
Survivors of Titanic gathered on Carpathia's forward well deck

Rostron ordered the ship's heating and hot water cut off in order to make as much steam as possible available for the engines, and had extra lookouts on watch to spot icebergs. He ordered three doctors to wait in each of the classes' dining saloons to tend to survivors of each class, and for blankets, ladders, and mail sacks to be put at each gangway door for survivors. Joseph Zupichich, a steward, recalled the captain telling the crew, "We are in danger. I am risking your lives. The Titanic is in trouble and is sinking and we have to go help them."

Cottam, meanwhile, messaged Titanic that Carpathia was coming as quickly as possible and that they expected to reach their location within four hours. Cottam refrained from sending more signals after this, trying to keep the network clear for Titanic's distress signals. Carpathia reached the edge of the ice field by 2:45 a.m., and for the next two hours dodged icebergs as small growlers of ice ground along the hull plates. Carpathia arrived at the distress call's position at 4:00 a.m., approximately an hour and a half after Titanic went down, claiming approximately 1,500 lives (sources vary in their estimates). For the next four and a half hours, the ship took on the survivors from Titanic's lifeboats. Captain Rostron decided that the survivors should be hoisted aboard the ship through the between-deck entrance nearest the waterline and posted Árpád Lengyel there, because he had paramedic experience and was tasked to perform the initial diagnosis. Chief surgeon Francis Edward "Frank" McGee assisted the first class passengers, assistant surgeon Vittorio Risicato the second class passengers. Survivors were given blankets and coffee, and then escorted by stewards to the dining rooms. Others went on deck to survey the ocean for any sign of their loved ones. Throughout the rescue, Carpathia's passengers assisted in any way that they could, offering warm food, beverages, blankets, accommodations, and words of comfort. By 9:00 a.m., the last survivor had been picked up from the lifeboats, and Rostron gave the order to sail away from the area.

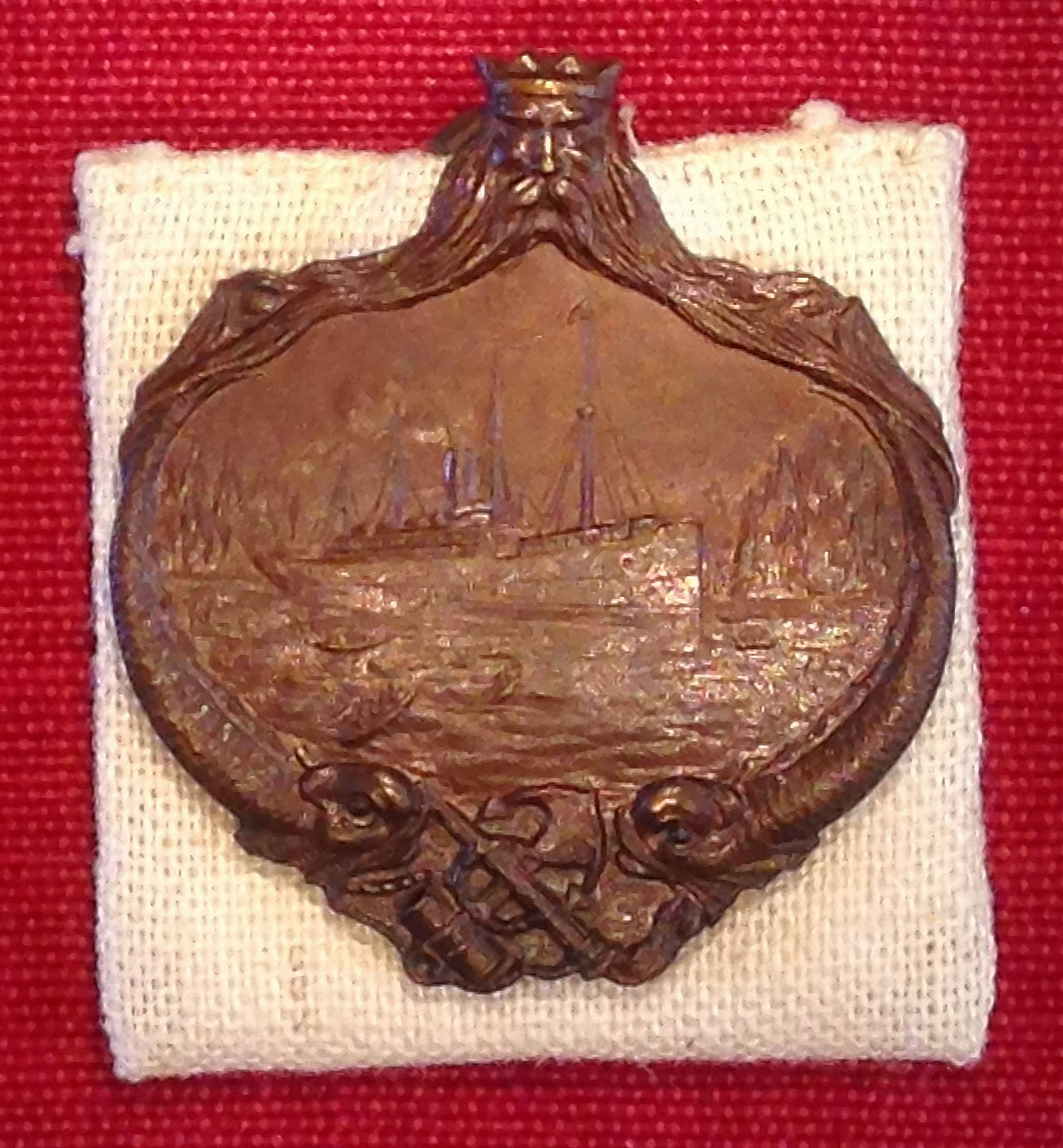
A medal awarded to a Carpathia crew member for the rescue of Titanic survivors

After considering options for where to disembark the passengers, including the Azores (the destination with the least cost to the Cunard Line) and Halifax (the closest port, although along an ice-laden route), Rostron consulted with Bruce Ismay, and ultimately decided to disembark the survivors in New York City, the original destination of Titanic. News of the disaster rapidly spread on shore, and Carpathia became the centre of intense attention from the press as she steamed westward towards New York at an average speed of 14 knots. Hundreds of wireless messages were being sent from Cape Race and other shore stations addressed to Captain Rostron from relatives of Titanic passengers and journalists demanding details in exchange for money. Rostron ordered that no news stories would be transmitted directly to the press, deferring such responsibilities to the White Star offices as Cottam provided details to Titanic's sister ship, Olympic. On 17 April, the light cruiser USS Chester began escorting Carpathia to New York. Titanic's junior wireless operator Harold Bride, who had been assisting Cottam since the previous night, transmitted the names of third-class survivors to Chester. Slowed by heavy thunderstorms and fog since the early morning of 16 April, Carpathia finally arrived in New York on the evening of 18 April 1912 under heavy rain.

The liner docked at the White Star Line pier, Pier 59, and offloaded thirteen of Titanic's lifeboats before proceeding to the Cunard pier, Pier 54, to disembark the remaining survivors.

For their rescue work, the crew of Carpathia were awarded multiple medals by the survivors. Crew members were awarded bronze medals, officers silver, and Captain Rostron a silver cup and a gold medal, presented by Margaret Brown. Rostron was knighted by King George V, and was later a guest of President William Howard Taft at the White House, where he was presented with a Congressional Gold Medal, the highest honour the United States Congress could confer upon an individual.

Josip Car, from Crikvenica, present-day Croatia, was an 18-year-old waiter onboard Carpathia. After participating in the rescue, he kept a Titanic life jacket as a souvenir and donated it in 1938 to the Maritime and History Museum of the Croatian Littoral in Rijeka. It is one of fourteen known and confirmed original life jackets from Titanic and the only one preserved and permanently displayed in Europe.

Carpathia Seamount, one of the Fogo Seamounts southeast of the Grand Banks of Newfoundland in the North Atlantic Ocean, is named after Carpathia for her involvement in the Titanic disaster.

== Service in the First World War ==
During the First World War, HMT Carpathia was used to transfer Canadian and American Expeditionary Forces to Europe. At least some of her voyages were in convoy, sailing from New York through Halifax to Liverpool and Glasgow. Among her passengers during the war years was Frank Buckles, who went on to become the last surviving American veteran of the Great War. Apparently some point during her enlistment, her long-faded red funnel, custom of the Cunard Line, was painted in battle grey. Sometime prior to March 1918, the entire ship was painted in wartime dazzle camouflage.

=== Sinking and aftermath ===
Location of the sinking

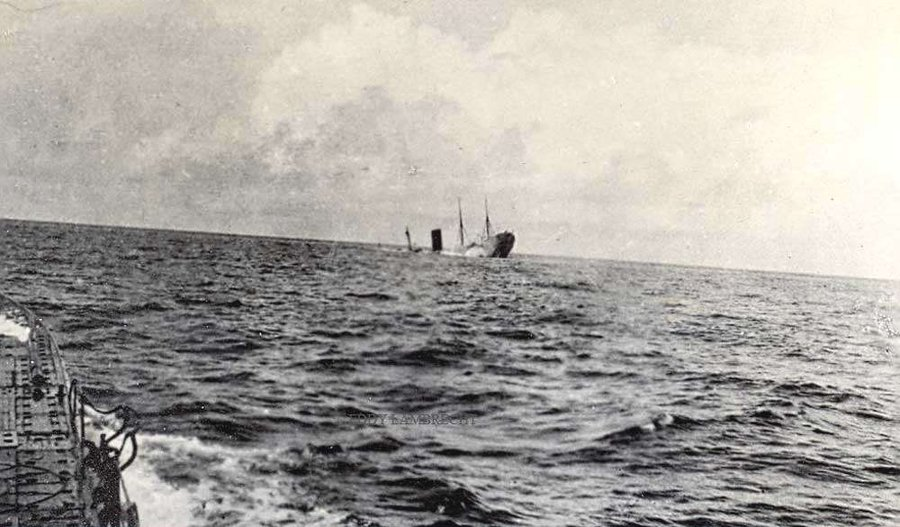
Carpathia sinking after being struck by three torpedoes fired by U-55 west of Land's End

On 15 July 1918, Carpathia departed from Liverpool in a convoy bound for Boston, carrying 57 passengers (36 saloon class and 21 steerage) and 166 crew. The convoy travelled on a zig-zag course along with an escort in accordance with procedures against submarine attacks. The escort left the convoy early in the morning of 17 July, and the convoy was cut in half. Carpathia continued west along with six other ships, and as the largest ship in the convoy, she assumed the role of the commodore ship. Three and a half hours later, at 9:15 a.m., while sailing in the Southwest Approaches, a torpedo was sighted approaching on her port side. The engines were thrown in full-astern and the helm was turned hard-a-starboard, but it was too late to avoid the torpedo. Carpathia was torpedoed near the No. 3 hatch on the port side by the Imperial German Navy submarine SM U-55, followed by a second which penetrated the engine room, killing three firemen and two trimmers, and effectively disabling her ability to escape, as the engines were rendered inoperable by the second torpedo impact. The explosion severely damaged Carpathia's electrical gear, including the wireless radio apparatus, as well as two of the ship's lifeboats. As a result, Captain William Prothero, in command of Carpathia since 1916, signalled the other ships in the convoy to send out wireless messages by use of flags. He then had rockets fired to attract the attention of nearby patrol boats. The remaining convoy steamed away at full speed to elude the submarine.

As Carpathia began to settle by the head and list to port, Prothero gave the order to abandon ship. All passengers and the surviving crew members boarded the 11 lifeboats as Carpathia sank. There were 218 survivors of the 223 aboard. As the passengers and crew disembarked, Prothero, the chief officer, first and second officers and the gunners remained on the sinking ship, seeing to it that all the confidential books and documents were thrown overboard. The captain then signalled one of the lifeboats to come alongside, and he and the remaining crew members abandoned their ship. U-55 surfaced and fired a third torpedo into the ship near the gunner's rooms, resulting in a massive explosion that doomed Carpathia. U-55 started approaching the lifeboats when the Azalea-class sloop HMS Snowdrop arrived on the scene and drove away the submarine with gunfire before picking up the survivors from Carpathia around 1:00 p.m. Snowdrop arrived back in Liverpool with the survivors on the evening of 18 July.

Carpathia sank at 11:00 a.m. at a position recorded by Snowdrop as 49°25′N 10°25′W, about 1 hour and 45 minutes after the torpedo strike, and approximately 120 mi (190 km) west of Fastnet. At the time of her sinking, Carpathia was the fifth Cunard steamship sunk in as many weeks, the others being Ascania, Ausonia, Dwinsk and Valentia, leaving only five Cunarders afloat from the large pre-war fleet.

== Discovery and salvage works ==
On 9 September 1999, the Reuters and AP wire services reported that Argosy International Ltd., headed by Graham Jessop, son of the undersea explorer Keith Jessop, and sponsored by the National Underwater and Marine Agency (NUMA), had discovered Carpathia's wreck in 600 ft (180 m) of water, 185 mi (298 km) west of Land's End. Adverse weather conditions forced his ship to abandon the position before Jessop could verify the discovery using underwater cameras. However, when he returned to the location, the wreck was determined to be the Hamburg-America Line's Isis, sunk on 8 November 1936.

In 2000, the American author and diver Clive Cussler announced that his organisation, NUMA, had found the true wreck of Carpathia in the spring of that year, at a depth of 500 ft (150 m). It was found that Carpathia landed upright on the seabed. NUMA gave the approximate location of the wreck as 120 mi (190 km) west of Fastnet, Ireland.

The wreck of Carpathia is owned by Premier Exhibitions Inc., formerly RMS Titanic Inc., which had planned to recover objects from the wreck.

== Profile ==
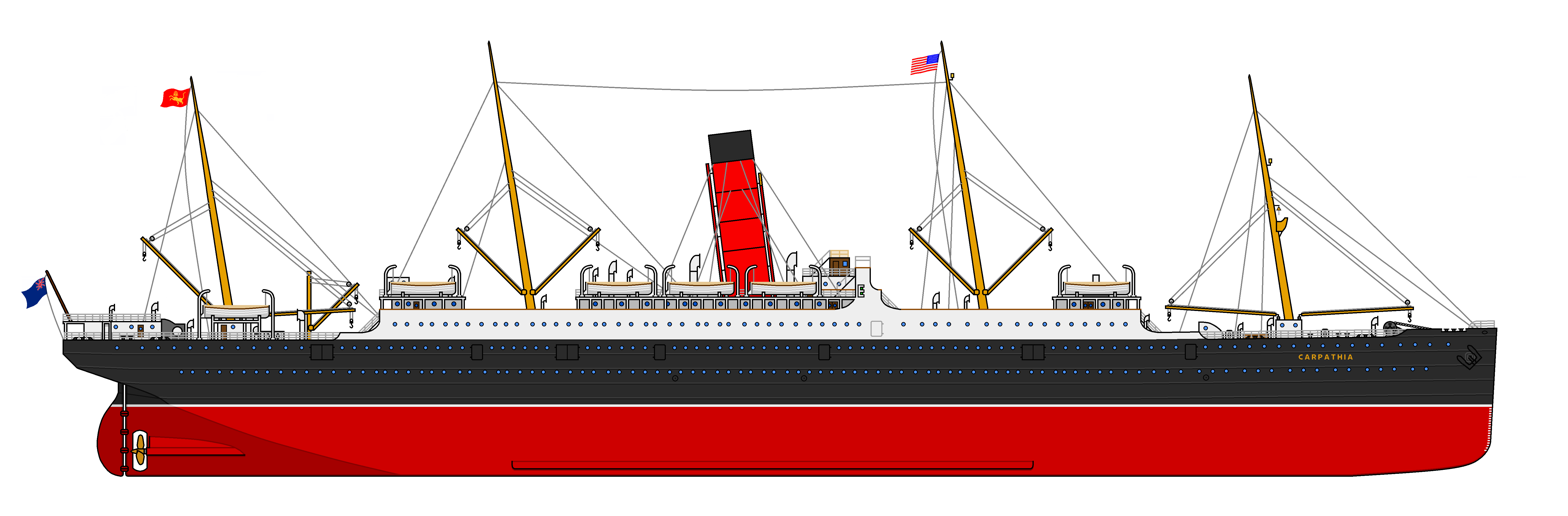
A side Scale Version of the RMS Carpathia

== Gallery ==
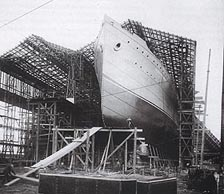
The painted hull of Carpathia rests on the slipway, awaiting launch.

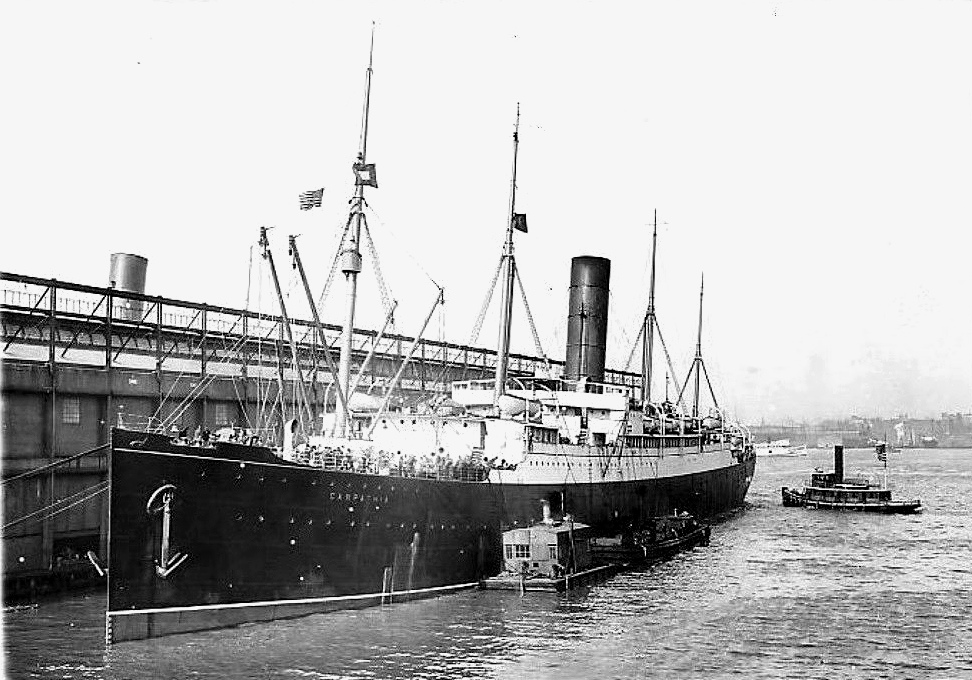
Carpathia, having docked in New York following the rescue of Titanic's survivors

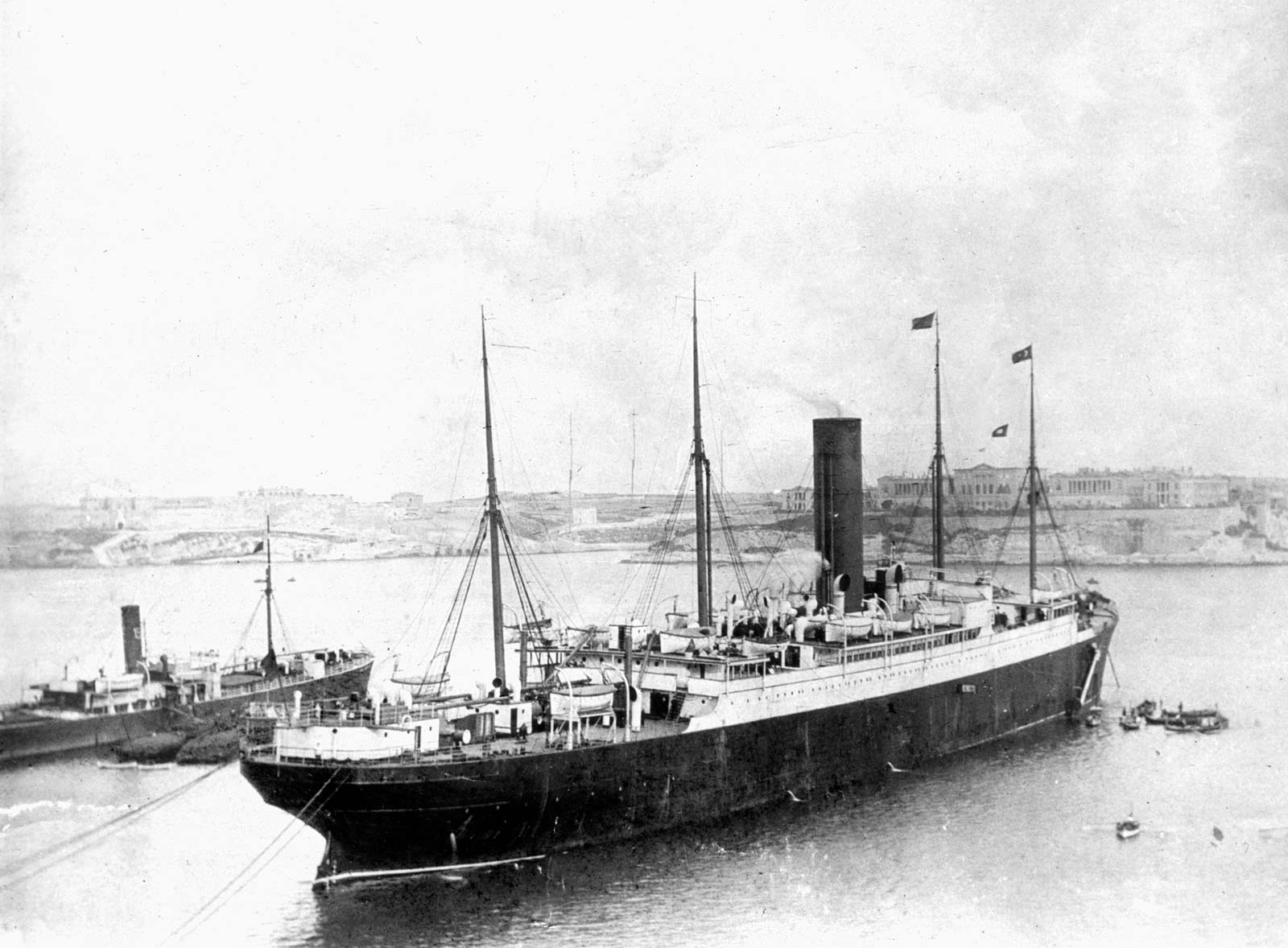
Carpathia.

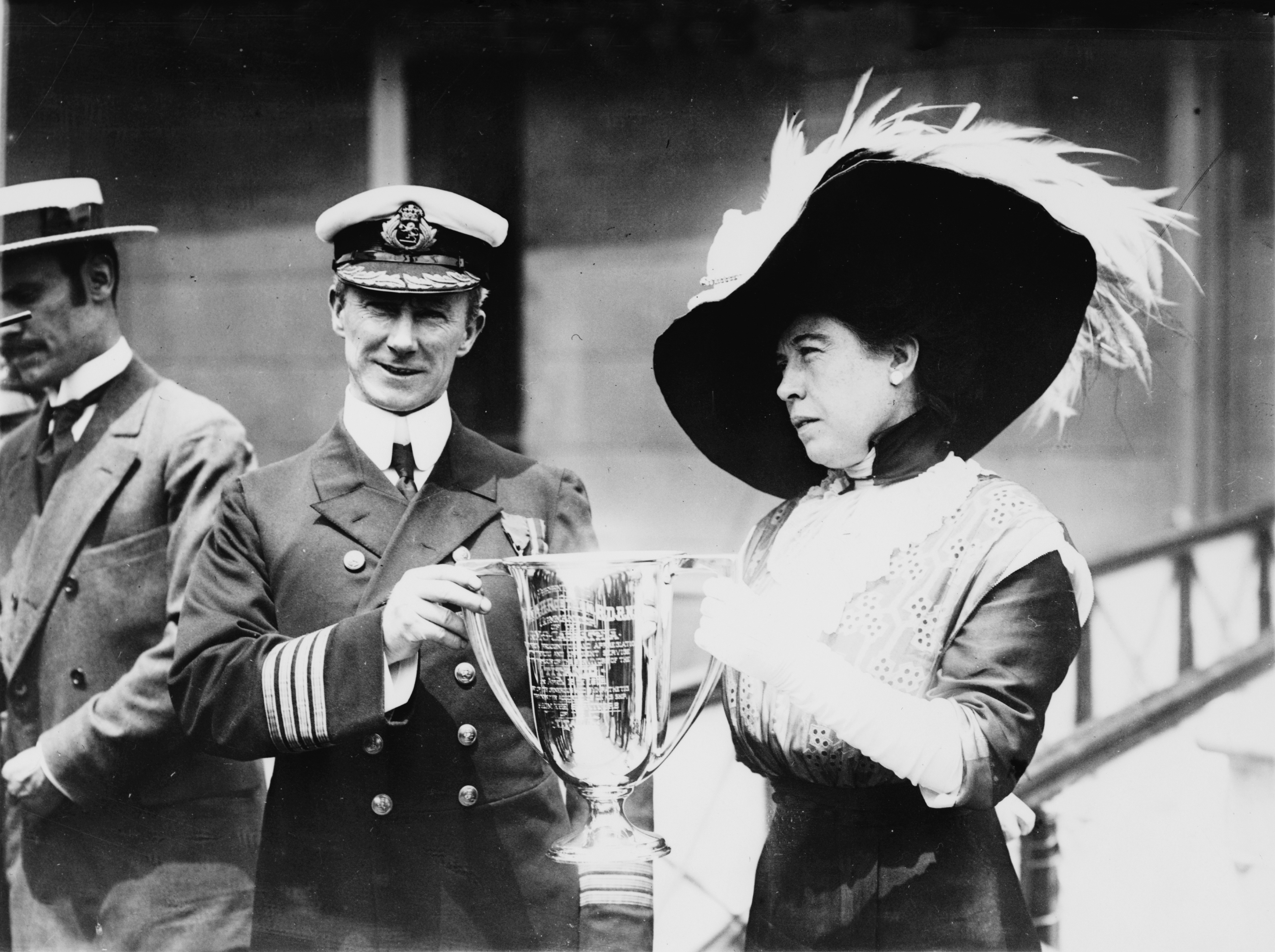
Margaret Brown (right) giving Captain Arthur Henry Rostron a golden award for his service in the rescue of Titanic's survivors

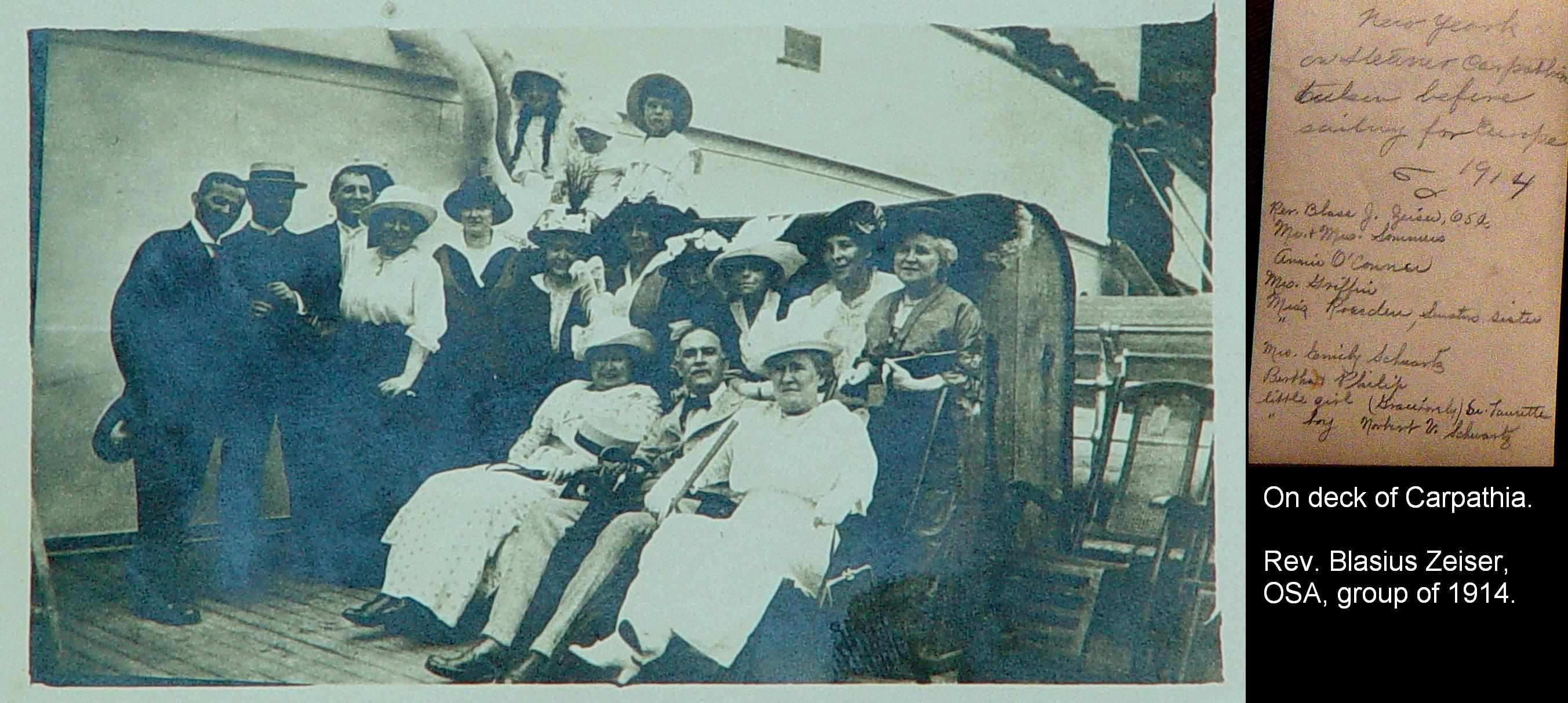
Rare on-deck photo of Carpathia's passengers (c. 1914), unconnected with the Titanic disaster

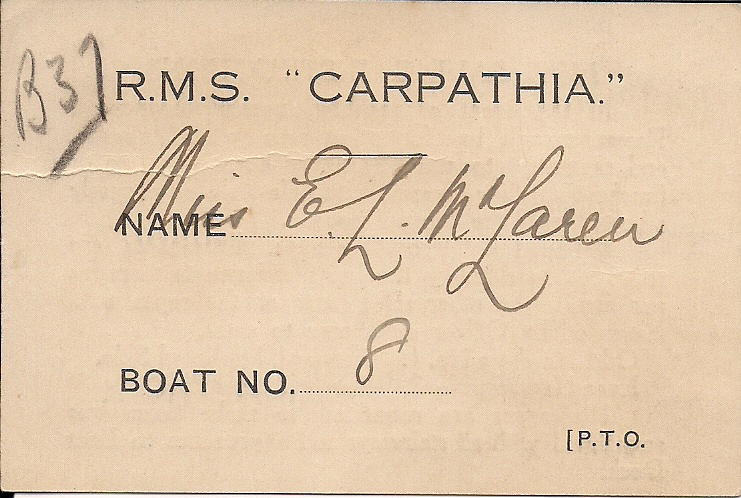
A lifeboat card from Carpathia, used to identify a Titanic survivor's lifeboat

== See also ==
- SS Californian, another vessel that was involved with the sinking of Titanic and sank in the First World War, famously missing Titanic's distress calls.
- SS Mount Temple, another vessel which responded to Titanic's distress calls and rushed to their aid but was forced to stop on the other side of the icefield.
