= Frankfort =

Frankfort may refer to:

== Places ==
=== Germany ===
- Frankfurt am Main, alternative name. "Frankfort" is the form of the name in the Hessian and Palatine dialects which are spoken in the region where Frankfurt is located.
- Frankfurt (Oder)

=== South Africa ===
- Frankfort, Eastern Cape
- Frankfort, Free State

=== United Kingdom ===
- Frankfort, Norfolk, England

=== United States ===
- Frankfort, Alabama, an unincorporated community
- Frankfort, Illinois, a village
- Frankfort, Franklin County, Illinois, a former town now merged with the city of West Frankfort
- Frankfort, Indiana, a city
- Frankfort, Kansas, a city
- Frankfort, Kentucky, the state capital and best-known U.S. city with this name
- Frankfort, Maine, a town
- Frankfort, Michigan, a city
- Frankfort (town), New York, a town
  - Frankfort (village), New York, within the town of Frankfort
- Frankfort, Lucas County, Ohio, an unincorporated community
- Frankfort, Ohio, a village
- Frankfort, South Dakota, a city
- Frankfort, Washington, a ghost town
- Frankfort, Marathon County, Wisconsin, a town
- Frankfort, Pepin County, Wisconsin, a town
- Frankfort Township (disambiguation), several places

== People ==
- Frank Frankfort Moore (1855–1931), British dramatist, novelist and poet
- Henri Frankfort (1897–1954), Dutch Egyptologist, archaeologist and orientalist
- Jacob Frankfort (1801–unknown), first known Jewish immigrant to Los Angeles, California
- Four holders of the title Viscount Frankfort de Montmorency

== Other uses ==
- The Frankfort meteorite of 1868, which fell in Alabama, United States (see meteorite falls)

== See also ==
- Frankford (disambiguation)
- Frankfurt (disambiguation)
