= Montmagny Seamount =

Seamount offshore of Newfoundland and southwest of the Grand Banks

- Location within North Atlantic

Location
- Location: North Atlantic Ocean, 700 km (430 mi) south of Cape Race
- Group: Fogo Seamounts
- Coordinates: 40°22′N 51°33′W
- Country: Canada

Geology
- Type: Submarine volcano
- Age of rock: Early Cretaceous

Montmagny Seamount, formerly known as Minia Seamount, is an undersea mountain in the North Atlantic Ocean, located about 700 km (430 mi) south of Cape Race in Canadian waters off Atlantic Canada. It rises to a height of over 1,000 m (3,300 ft) and has an areal extent of 440 km^{2} (170 mi^{2}), making it slightly larger than the Quebec city of Montreal.

Montmagny is one of the seven named Fogo Seamounts. It was originally named Minia Seamount after a Canadian cable ship that helped search for bodies from the Titanic disaster. However, this name had already been in use for a seamount further to the northeast and was therefore renamed in 1997 to Montmagny Seamount after the Canadian steamship SS Montmagny. This steamship participated in two recovery missions after the Titanic disaster.
