= Frankfurter (surname) =

Frankfurter is a surname. Notable people with the surname include:

- David Frankfurter (1909–1982), Croatian–Israeli assassin of Nazi leader Wilhelm Gustloff
- Felix Frankfurter (1882–1965), Associate Justice of the United States Supreme Court
- Mavro Frankfurter (1875–1942), Croatian and Vinkovci rabbi
- Moses Frankfurter (1672–1762), dayan, rabbi, writer, and printer based out of Amsterdam
- Philipp Frankfurter (c. 1450 – 1511), Viennese writer
