= SS Frankfurt =

German-built steamship

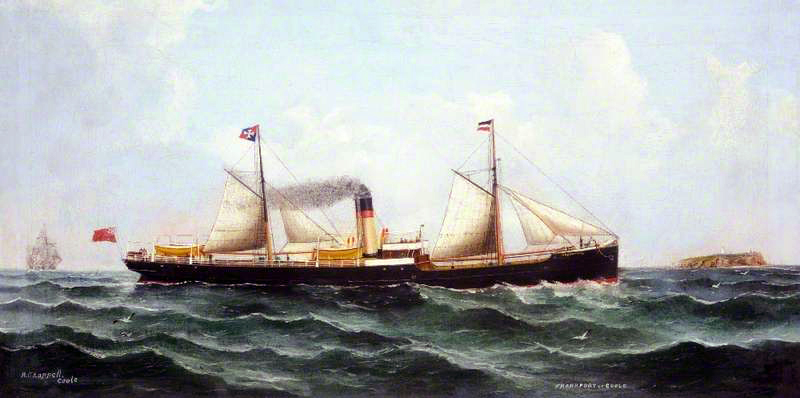

History

German Empire
- Name: Frankfurt
- Owner: Norddeutscher Lloyd
- Port of registry: Bremen
- Builder: Joh. C. Tecklenborg, Geestemunde
- Yard number: 169
- Launched: 17 December 1899
- Maiden voyage: 31 March 1900
- In service: 1900–1914
- Out of service: 1919
- Identification: code letters QGWB; Wireless call sign DFT
- Fate: Surrendered to the United Kingdom

History

United Kingdom
- Name: Frankfurt
- Owner: White Star Line (1919–1922)
- Port of registry: Liverpool
- Acquired: 1919
- In service: 1919
- Out of service: 1922
- Fate: Sold to the Oriental Navigation Company

History

Hong Kong
- Name: Sarvistan
- Owner: Oriental Navigation Company
- Port of registry: Hong Kong
- Acquired: 1922
- In service: 1922
- Out of service: 1931
- Fate: Scrapped in Japan

General characteristics
- Type: passenger ship
- Tonnage: 7,341 GRT
- Length: 429.0 ft (130.8 m)
- Beam: 54.3 ft (16.6 m)
- Depth: 39.4 ft (12.0 m)
- Decks: 2
- Installed power: 2 × triple-expansion engines; 509 NHP
- Propulsion: 2 × screws
- Speed: 13 kn (24 km/h; 15 mph)
- Capacity: passengers: 2,007
- Sensors & processing systems: submarine signalling

SS Frankfurt was a German steamship built by Joh. C. Tecklenborg. First launched on 17 December 1899, Frankfurt was first operated under Norddeutscher Lloyd. She took frequent passages between Germany and the United States from 1900 to 1918. Many of her passengers were migrants. In 1919, Frankfurt was acquired by the White Star Line after she was surrendered to the United Kingdom in World War I. In 1922, Frankfurt was then sold to the Oriental Navigation Company in British Hong Kong, where she was renamed Sarvistan.

In 1912, she was one of the first ships to respond to the distress signals from RMS Titanic.

== History ==
Frankfurt was built by Joh. C. Tecklenborg in Geestemunde (present-day Bremerhaven, Germany), and the second of her namesake to be launched for Norddeutscher Lloyd on 17 December 1899. Most of the ship's activity prior to the First World War was transporting mainly German and Austrian migrants to the United States. On 31 March 1900, her maiden voyage started from Bremen to Baltimore. On 25 December 1901, Frankfurt took the first trip to Galveston, Texas, after which she took frequent trips from Bremen to either Baltimore, Galveston, or both. In 1908, she sailed to South America. Then, starting in 1910, she started the first of many voyages from Bremen to Philadelphia to Galveston. In 1914, she took voyages from Bremen, to Boston, and then to New Orleans. At the conclusion of the First World War, Frankfurt was surrendered to the United Kingdom and was acquired by the White Star Line in 1919. In 1922, the ship was sold to the Oriental Navigation Company in British Hong Kong and renamed Sarvistan. In 1931, she was scrapped in Japan.

== Sinking of RMS Titanic ==
At roughly 12:15 AM (Titanic' time) on 15 April 1912, while eastbound from Galveston to Bremerhaven, Frankfurt was the first vessel to respond to distress signals from the RMS Titanic. Under the orders of Captain Edward John Smith, Titanic's wireless operator, Jack Phillips, tried to reach out to Frankfurt to acknowledge his position. However, Frankfurt's operator, W. Zippel, only answered with "Standby". It can only be speculated whether he informed his captain at this time. At 12:38 Frankfurt sent her position to Titanic and was told by Phillips to inform his bridge and come to assistance. At this time the Frankfurt was between 120 and 150 nautical miles away from the Titanic. This already made it difficult for Frankfurt's wireless operator to hear and understand Titanic's calls. According to some reports the Frankfurt's wireless signal strength indicate that she was actually closer to the Titanic (According to the wireless operator on Mount Temple and the surviving wireless operator on Titanic, Harold Bride). However, this is most likely due to a more powerful wireless transmitter installed in the Frankfurt compared to the surrounding ships.

At around 1:23 AM, Titanic's wireless transmitter lost power, hence debilitating her communication with Frankfurt and many other ships responding to her distress calls. As Frankfurt was no longer receiving calls from Titanic, Zippel tried to regain contact with her with the message "What is the matter with you?", which had unintentionally angered Phillips. Phillips, frustrated that the Frankfurt had seemed not to have known the situation the whole time after receiving Titanic's first distress call, answered: "You are a fool! Stand by and keep out!". However, this was most likely not heard by Frankfurt's operator due to the distance between the ships and Titanic's fading signal strength.

George Behe of the Titanic Historical Society pointed out that Zippel, at the time of Phillips' outrage, was well aware of the seriousness of Titanic's situation. Even though Hattorff did not know the actual scope of the situation, he assumed it to be the worst with the limited details he had. He even assumed that the Titanic went down at 1:23 AM since that was the last time that he heard a message from Titanic.

Once the Titanic's situation was realized, according to Überall (a German magazine), the Frankfurt's captain, Hattorff, steered toward the Titanic's position at full speed. He ordered the ship's galley to bake bread and the crew to provide blankets for the passengers they would rescue. Captain Hattorff estimated that by the given coordinates, he could make it to the site by 11:00 AM.

The Frankfurt was the first to notify the SS Californian, the closest ship to the Titanic, that she had sunk overnight.

Frankfurt Seamount, one of the Fogo Seamounts southeast of the Grand Banks of Newfoundland in the North Atlantic Ocean, is named after Frankfurt.

== Annotations ==
1. There was a previous ship owned by Norddeutscher Lloyd also called Frankfurt built in 1829 by Caird & Company in Greenock, Scotland, and scrapped in La Spezia, Italy, in 1897, two years before the launching of the newer Frankfurt in 1899. It had a similar career to that of her sister taking transatlantic voyages from Bremerhaven to cities like New Orleans and also once had a voyage to South America. However, unlike her younger sister, the older Frankfurt sailed to New York City and even Havana, Cuba.
