= Frankfort Township =

Frankfort Township may refer to:

- Frankfort Township, Franklin County, Illinois
- Frankfort Township, Will County, Illinois
- Frankfort Township, Knox County, Nebraska
