= Robin Gardiner =

English Titanic conspiracy theorist

- Born: Robin Gardiner; 24 May 1947; Headington, England.
- Died: 23 July 2017 (aged 70)
- Education: City of Oxford College (Engineering)
- Occupations: Writer, conspiracy theorist, engineer
- Spouse: Lynn Gardiner
- Children: William Gardiner
- Parent(s): Harold Gardiner; Audrey Gardiner

Robin Gardiner (24 May 1947 – 23 July 2017) was an English Titanic conspiracy theorist who made several theories in which the Titanic never sank. Most of the conspiracy theories revolved around an alleged switch with Titanic's sister ship, the RMS Olympic.

== Biography ==
He was born in the suburb of Oxford, Headington on 24 May 1947, the middle child of three, his parents were Harold Gardiner, a military man, and Audry Gardiner. His fascination with the RMS Titanic started during his childhood and he researched her history until his death, writing several books where he covered his controversial theory.

He married Lynn in Oxford on 20 January 1979 and the couple had one son, Will. He died from stomach cancer on 23 July 2017, at the age of 70 (Robin Gardiner died not his son).

== Gardiner's Ship That Never Sank ==
One of the most controversial and complex theories was put forward by Robin Gardiner in his book, Titanic: The Ship That Never Sank?. In it, Gardiner draws on several events and coincidences that occurred in the months, days, and hours leading up to the sinking of the Titanic, and concludes that the ship that sank was in fact Titanic's sister ship Olympic, disguised as Titanic, as an insurance scam by her owners, the International Mercantile Marine Group, controlled by American financier J.P. Morgan that had acquired the White Star Line in 1902.

Olympic was the slightly older sister of Titanic, built alongside the more famous vessel but launched in October 1910. Her exterior profile was nearly identical to Titanic, save for minor details such as the number of portholes on the forward C decks of the ships, the spacing of the windows on the B decks, and the forward section of the A deck promenade on Titanic that had been enclosed only a few weeks before she set sail on her ill-fated maiden voyage. Both ships were built with linoleum floors, but shortly before she was due to set sail J. Bruce Ismay, managing director of the White Star Line, inexplicably ordered the floors aboard Titanic carpeted over.

On 20 September 1911, the Olympic was involved in a collision with the Royal Navy Warship HMS Hawke in the Brambles Channel in Southampton Water while under the command of a harbour pilot. The two ships were close enough to each other that Olympic's motion drew the Hawke into her aft starboard side, causing extensive damage to the liner – both above and below its waterline (HMS Hawke was fitted with a re-inforced 'ram' below the waterline, purposely designed to cause maximum damage to enemy ships). An Admiralty inquiry assigned blame to the Olympic, despite numerous eyewitness accounts to the contrary.

Gardiner's theory plays out in this historical context. Olympic was found to be at blame in the collision (which, according to Gardiner, had damaged the central turbine's mountings and bent the keel, giving the ship a slight permanent list to port). Because of this finding, White Star's insurers Lloyd's of London allegedly refused to pay out on the claim. White Star's flagship would also be out of action during the extensive repairs, and the Titanic's completion date, which was already behind schedule due to Olympic's return to the yard after her loss of a propeller blade, would have to be delayed. All this would amount to a serious financial loss for the company. Gardiner proposes that, to make sure at least one vessel would be earning money, the badly damaged Olympic was patched up and then converted to become the Titanic. The real Titanic when complete would then quietly enter service as the Olympic.

The Titanic indeed had a list to port leaving Southampton. Inadequate trimming of cargo and bunkers would likely result in such and the crew seems to have demonstrated a lack of proficiency on several occasions. A list to port was noted by several Titanic survivors including Lawrence Beesley who wrote in his book about the sinking: "I then called the attention of our table to the way the Titanic listed to port (I had noticed this before), and we watched the skyline through the portholes as we sat at the purser's table in the saloon." (The dining saloon windows were double rows of portholes covered on the inside with screens of leaded decorative glass with no clear view of the outdoors.) This was echoed by survivor Norman Chambers, who testified that after the collision: "However, there was then a slight list to starboard, with probably a few degrees in pitch; and as the ship had a list to port nearly all afternoon, I decided to remain up."

Gardiner states that few parts of either ship bore the name, other than the easily removed lifeboats, bell, compass binnacle, and name plates. Everything else was standard White Star issue and was interchangeable between the two ships, and other vessels in the White Star fleet. While all other White Star Line Ships had their name engraved into the hull, the Titanic alone had its name riveted over top. In recent pictures of the wreck depicting a spot where two riveted plates that had spelled Titanic fell off, the letters MP appear to be stamped into the hull.

The plan, Gardiner suggests, was to dispose of the Olympic, which had allegedly been damaged beyond economic repair in a way that would allow White Star to collect the full insured value of a brand new ship. He supposes that the seacocks were to be opened at sea to slowly flood the ship. If numerous ships were stationed nearby to take off the passengers, the shortage of lifeboats would not matter as the ship would sink slowly and the boats could make several trips to the rescuers.

Gardiner uses as evidence the length of Titanic's sea trials. Olympic's trials in 1910 took two days, including several high speed runs, but Titanic's trials reportedly only lasted for one day, with (Gardiner alleges) no working over half-speed. Gardiner says this was because the patched-up hull could not take any long periods of high speed. Perhaps this was due to the fact that Titanic as a nearly identical twin sister of the Olympic was expected to handle exactly the same, or perhaps the Board of Trade inspectors were in on the scheme.

Gardiner maintains that on 14 April, First Officer Murdoch (who was not officially on duty yet) was on the bridge because he was one of the few high-ranking officers other than Captain Smith who knew of the plan and was keeping a watch out for the rescue ships. One of Gardiner's most controversial statements is that the Titanic did not strike an iceberg, but an IMM rescue ship that was drifting on station with its lights out. Gardiner based this hypothesis on the idea that the supposed iceberg was seen at such a short distance by the lookouts on the Titanic because it was actually a darkened ship, and he also does not believe an iceberg could inflict such sustained and serious damage to a steel double-hulled vessel such as the Titanic.

Gardiner further hypothesises that the ship that was hit by the Titanic was the one seen by the Californian firing distress rockets, and that this explains the perceived inaction of the Californian (which traditionally is seen as failing to come to the rescue of the Titanic after sighting its distress rockets). Gardiner's hypothesis is that the Californian, another IMM ship, was not expecting rockets but a rendezvous. The ice on the deck of the Titanic is explained by Gardiner as ice from the rigging of both the Titanic and the mystery ship she hit. As for the true Titanic, Gardiner alleges that she spent 25 years in service as the Olympic and was scrapped in 1935.

Researchers Bruce Beveridge and Steve Hall took issue with many of Gardiner's claims in their book, Olympic and Titanic: The Truth Behind the Conspiracy. Author Mark Chirnside has also raised serious questions about the switch theory.
