= Carpathia Seamount =

Seamount offshore of Newfoundland and southwest of the Grand Banks

- Location within North Atlantic

Location
- Location: North Atlantic Ocean, 660 km (410 mi) southeast of Cape Race
- Group: Fogo Seamounts
- Coordinates: 41°6′N 49°33′W
- Country: Canada

Geology
- Type: Submarine volcano
- Age of rock: Early Cretaceous

Carpathia Seamount, also known as Carpathia Knoll, is an undersea mountain in the North Atlantic Ocean, located about 600 km (370 mi) southeast of Cape Race in Canadian waters off Atlantic Canada. It rises to a height of over 1,000 m (3,300 ft) and has an areal extent of 550 km^{2} (210 mi^{2}), making it slightly larger than the Ontarian city of Kingston. Carpathia Seamount and Mount Temple Seamount about 90 km (56 mi) to the west are among the closest seamounts to the RMS Titanic wreck.

Carpathia Seamount is one of the seven named Fogo Seamounts. Its name is derived from the British steamship RMS Carpathia, which was the first on the scene after the RMS Titanic collided with an iceberg. The Carpathia rescued passengers of the Titanic following her sinking.
