= Frankfurt Seamount =

Seamount offshore of Newfoundland and southwest of the Grand Banks

- Location within Atlantic Ocean

Location
- Location: North Atlantic Ocean, 560 km (350 mi) south of Cape Race
- Group: Fogo Seamounts
- Coordinates: 42°16′N 53°00′W
- Country: Canada

Geology
- Type: Submarine volcano
- Age of rock: Early Cretaceous

Frankfurt Seamount, also known as Frankfurt Knoll, is an undersea mountain in the North Atlantic Ocean, located about 480 km (300 mi) south of Cape Race on the North American continental rise. Its summit is more than 2,000 m (6,600 ft) below sea level and rises to a height of over 1,000 m (3,300 ft). With an areal extent of 320 km^{2} (120 mi^{2}), Frankfurt Seamount is larger than the New Brunswick city of Saint John.

Frankfurt Seamount is one of the seven named Fogo Seamounts. Its name is derived from SS Frankfurt, a German steamship that was the first to respond to the distress signal from the sinking RMS Titanic.
