= Titanic conspiracy theories =

Pseudohistory of RMS Titanic

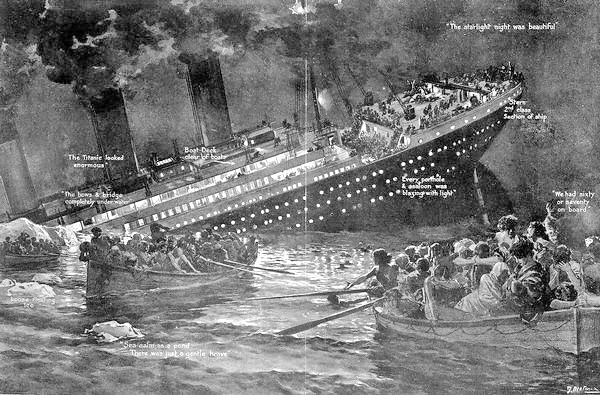
Illustration of the sinking of the Titanic

On April 14, 1912, the Titanic collided with an iceberg, damaging the hull's plates below the waterline on the starboard side, causing the front compartments to flood. The ship then sank two hours and forty minutes later, with approximately 1,496 fatalities as a result of drowning or hypothermia. Since then, many conspiracy theories have been suggested regarding the disaster. These theories have been refuted by subject-matter experts. These include the hypothesis that the ship was swapped with its sister ship RMS Olympic as part of an insurance scam, and the claim that J. P. Morgan deliberately sank the ship to eliminate opponents of the Federal Reserve.

== Olympic exchange hypothesis ==
One of the controversial and elaborate theories surrounding the sinking of the Titanic was advanced by Robin Gardiner in his book Titanic: The Ship That Never Sank? (1998). Gardiner draws on several events and coincidences that occurred in the months, days, and hours leading up to the sinking of the Titanic, and concludes that the ship that sank was in fact Titanic's sister ship Olympic disguised as Titanic, as an insurance scam by its owners, the International Mercantile Marine Group, controlled by American financier J. P. Morgan, who had acquired the White Star Line in 1902.

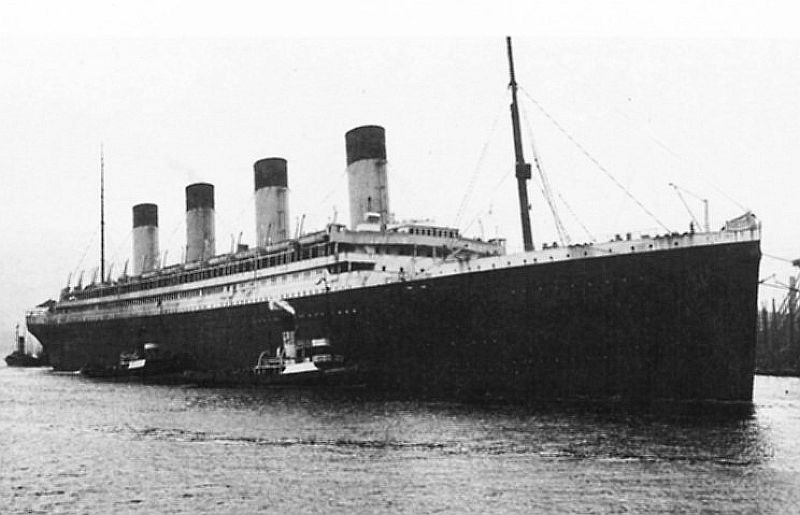
A photograph of the RMS Olympic.

Researchers Bruce Beveridge and Steve Hall took issue with many of Gardiner's claims in their book Olympic and Titanic: The Truth Behind the Conspiracy (2004). Author Mark Chirnside has also raised serious questions about the switch theory. British historian Gareth Russell, in his book, The Ship of Dreams: The Sinking of The Titanic and the End of the Edwardian Era, (2019) calls the theory "so painfully ridiculous that one can only lament the thousands of trees which lost their lives to provide the paper on which it has been articulated." He notes that, "since the sister ships had significant interior architectural and design differences, switching them secretly in a week would be nearly impossible from a practical standpoint. A switch would also not be economically worthwhile, since the ship's owners could have simply damaged the ship while docked (for instance, by setting a fire) and collected the insurance money from that 'accident', which would have been far less severe, and infinitely less stupid, than sailing her out into the middle of the Atlantic with thousands of people, and their luggage, on board, and ramming her into an iceberg". Maritime historian Chris Frame also noted that the Olympic and Titanic were at vastly different stages of construction when the two ships met in both 1911 and 1912, stating: "It is far more profitable to run a ship for decades than to sink it for a one-time payment. Sinking the Olympic for an insurance claim would have been a terrible business decision." Furthermore, maritime researcher Mike Brady has published extensive video analysis of the theory in which he notes an attempt to "set the record straight on Gardiner's theory and reveal the truth behind the great Titanic conspiracy theory; the greatest fraud in modern historiography." According to maritime historian J. Kent Layton, both Titanic and Olympic had a distinct construction yard number in parts of the ships, including their wood paneling: Olympic's yard number was 400, while Titanic's was 401. Multiple items bearing the number 401 have been recovered from the wreck of the Titanic, and artifacts auctioned off after the Olympic was retired in 1935 feature the number 400.

== Deliberately sunk ==
Another claim that started gaining traction in late 2017 alleges that J. P. Morgan deliberately sank the ship to kill off several millionaires who were in opposition to the Federal Reserve. The claim appears as early as 2002 in the book The Secret Terrorists by conspiracy theorist Bill Hughes, where it is purported that the sinking of the Titanic was part of a larger Jesuit plot to create a central bank in the United States. Some of the wealthiest men in the world were aboard the Titanic for her maiden voyage, several of whom, including John Jacob Astor IV, Benjamin Guggenheim, and Isidor Straus, were allegedly opposed to the creation of a U.S. central bank. No evidence of their opposition to Morgan's centralized banking ideas has been found: Astor and Guggenheim never spoke publicly on the subject, while Straus spoke in favor of the concept. Straus advocated banking reform, but his support was not unconditional. Reports in the Moline Daily Dispatch (Illinois) and the Austin Daily Herald (Minnesota), both dated October 17, 1911, highlighted his disagreements with aspects of the proposed reforms. His advocacy should therefore not be interpreted as blanket support for the Aldrich plan or every feature of a proposed central banking system. All three men died during the sinking. Conspiracy theorists suggest that Morgan arranged to have the men board the ship and then sunk it to eliminate them. Morgan cancelled his ticket for Titanic's maiden voyage due to a reported illness, while Guggenheim had not purchased a ticket before Morgan's cancellation. Morgan, nicknamed the "Napoleon of Wall Street", had helped create General Electric, U.S. Steel, and International Harvester, is the namesake of JPMorgan Chase, and was credited with almost single-handedly saving the U.S. banking system during the Panic of 1907. Morgan did have a hand in the creation of the Federal Reserve, and owned the International Mercantile Marine, which owned the White Star Line, and thus the Titanic.

Morgan, who had attended the Titanic's launching in 1911, had booked a personal suite aboard the ship with his own private promenade deck and a bath equipped with specially designed cigar holders. He was reportedly booked on the ship's maiden voyage but instead cancelled the trip and remained at the French resort of Aix-les-Bains to enjoy his morning massages and sulfur baths. His allegedly last-minute cancellation has fueled speculation among conspiracy theorists that he knew of the ship's fate. This theory has been refuted by Titanic experts George Behe, Don Lynch, and Ray Lepien who have each provided alternate, more widely accepted theories as to why Morgan cancelled his trip.

Conspiracy theorist Stew Peters has advanced an alternative version of the theory, alleging the Rothschilds were behind both the Federal Reserve and the Titanic's sinking. Peters also claimed that the Titan submersible implosion in 2023 was orchestrated via sabotage to prevent its own passengers from discovering that the Titanic was sunk by a "controlled demolition" instead of an iceberg.

== See also ==
- Encyclopedia Titanica – Online encyclopedia about the Titanic
- Legends and myths regarding the Titanic – "Unsinkable" ship and other made-up details

== Bibliography ==
- Halpern, Samuel; Weeks, Charles (2011). "Description of the Damage to the Ship". In Halpern, Samuel (ed.). Report into the Loss of the SS Titanic: A Centennial Reappraisal. Stroud, UK: The History Press. ISBN 978-0-7524-6210-3.
