= Sohm Abyssal Plain =

Geographic feature of the North Atlantic Ocean

Coordinates: 34°N 55°W

The Sohm Abyssal Plain is in the North Atlantic and has an area of around 900,000 square kilometres (350,000 sq mi). It is located off the coast of the Canadian Maritime provinces and New England in the United States. The region was named for Rudolf von Willemoes-Suhm, a German naturalist on the Challenger expedition in the late-19th Century.
