= Titanic Memorial =

Titanic Memorial can refer to:

- Titanic Memorial, Belfast, Northern Ireland
- Memorial to the Engine Room Heroes of the Titanic, Liverpool, England
- Titanic Memorial (New York City), United States
- Titanic Engineers' Memorial, Southampton, England
- Titanic Memorial (Washington, D.C.), United States

== See also ==
- Straus Park, in New York, memorializing Ida and Isidor Straus, who died on Titanic
- The Jack Phillips memorial cloister in Godalming, commemorating the radio operator who remained at his post while Titanic sank
