= Titanic Memorial (Washington, D.C.) =

Memorial in Washington, D.C., U.S.

- U.S. National Register of Historic Places
- D.C. Inventory of Historic Sites
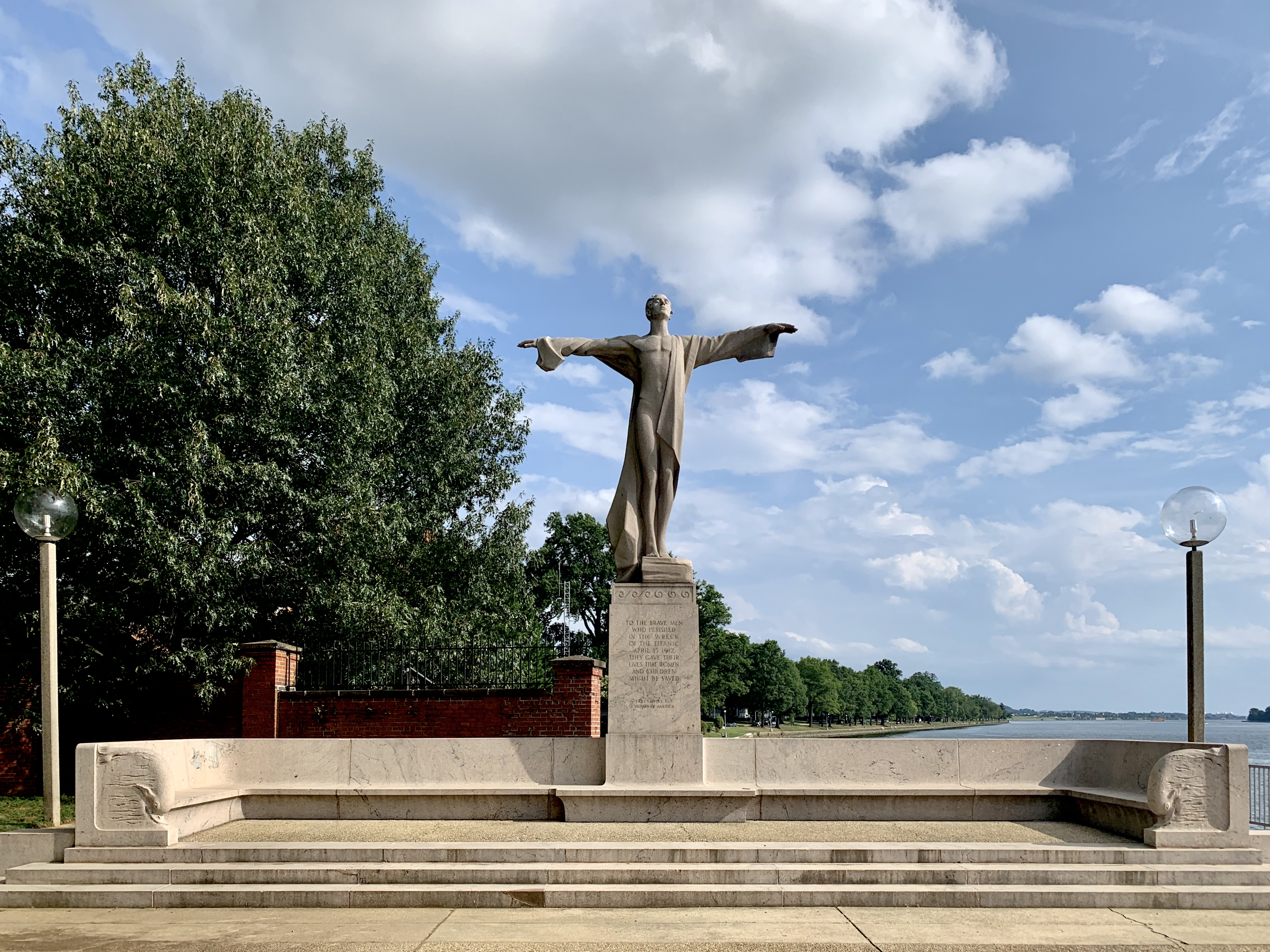
- Titanic Memorial in 2019

- Location within Washington, D.C.
- Location: Near 4th and P Street, SW, Washington, D.C., U.S.
- Coordinates: 38°52′19″N 77°01′09.5″W
- Built: 1931
- Architect: Gertrude Vanderbilt Whitney (designer); John Horrigan and Piccirilli Brothers (sculptors); Henry Bacon (architect); Meeker Brothers (stonework); R. B. Phelps Stone Company (fabricator, current location)
- Architectural style: Neoclassical
- NRHP reference No.: 07001060

Significant dates
- Added to NRHP: October 12, 2007
- Designated DCIHS: February 22, 2007

The Titanic Memorial is a granite statue in the Southwest Waterfront neighborhood of Washington, D.C., that honors the men who gave their lives so that women and children might be saved during the sinking of the Titanic. Ten days after the sinking, on April 25, 1912, a group of women formed a committee to raise money for a memorial to honor the sacrifice, with a limit of $1 per person. After sending thousands of cards to other women throughout the U.S., the funds the committee had raised alongside funding from the federal government were enough to complete the project. The competition-winning design by Gertrude Vanderbilt Whitney, who later opened the Whitney Museum of American Art, became her first major commission.

After planning and seeking approval from different agencies, the memorial was installed in 1930 and dedicated in May 1931. Among those at the dedication were President Herbert Hoover, First Lady Lou Henry Hoover, former first lady Helen Herron Taft, and other government officials. To make room for the John F. Kennedy Center for the Performing Arts, the memorial was placed in storage for two years. It was reinstalled at its current location at Southwest Waterfront Park. It is sited near 4th and P Street SW near Fort Lesley J. McNair and across the Washington Channel from East Potomac Park.

The centerpiece of the memorial depicts a partly clad male figure with arms outstretched standing on a square base. The base is flanked by a square exedra, created by architect Henry Bacon, which encloses a small, raised platform. The memorial was added to the District of Columbia Inventory of Historic Sites and the National Register of Historic Places in 2007. The statue is one of a small number of prominent outdoor sculptures in Washington designed by women.

== Memorial ==
=== Planning ===
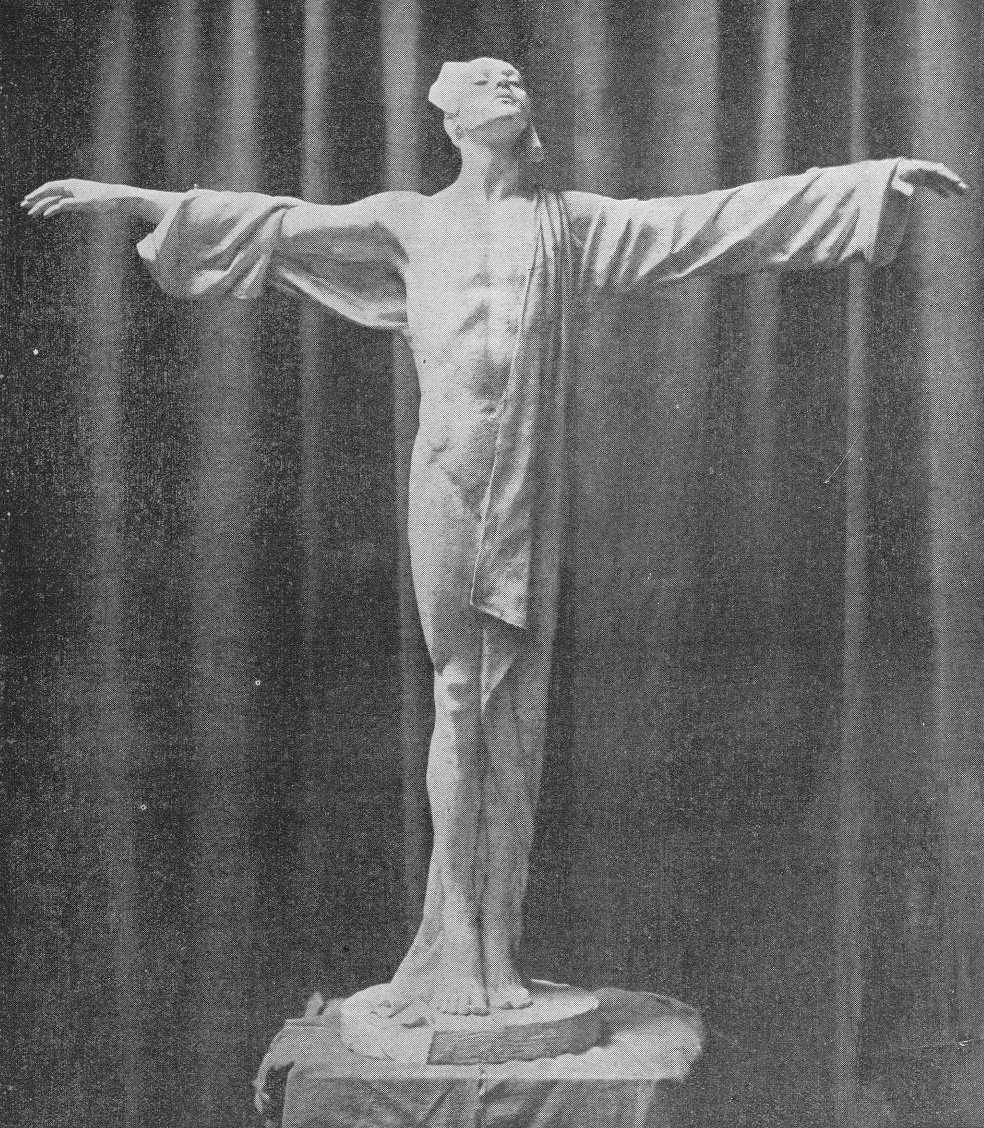
In 1914, The New York Times printed a photograph of Gertrude Vanderbilt Whitney's winning design for the memorial.

On April 15, 1912, the Titanic sank in the Atlantic Ocean after hitting an iceberg. Among the 2,223 people on board the ship, 706 survived. Around 70 percent of those who died were men, who were told the life rafts were for women and children. Ten days after the sinking, on April 25, 1912, an association of prominent women created the Committee of One Hundred to erect a memorial to honor the men who gave up their spot on a lifeboat. The committee's members first included U.S. congresswoman Florence Prag Kahn; philanthropist Laura Spelman Rockefeller; wife of the 26th U.S. vice president, Cornelia Cole Fairbanks; wife of senator Oscar W. Underwood, Bertha Woodward; wife of the FDA commissioner Harvey Washington Wiley, Anna Kelton; and the wife of jurist Theodore Marburg.

The women began a fundraising campaign for a memorial they pictured to include a large arch in a prominent place. The first woman to donate $1, the limit for each person (equivalent to $18.36 in 2025), was First Lady Helen Taft. Thousands of letters were sent to women across the country who were involved with various groups and societies, asking for donations to help erect the memorial. The committee had raised $43,000 by January 1914, and the remaining cost to erect the memorial was paid for by the U.S. government. In addition to wanting an arch as the memorial, the committee wanted it to be made of white marble and feature Lombardy poplar planted in a semi-circle.

There was a competition to design the memorial where eight sculptors submitted entries. The winner of the competition, Gertrude Vanderbilt Whitney, was selected in 1914 to design the memorial. Her design dropped the plans for an arch in favor of a statue of a nude man with his arms outstretched, rising 15 feet (4.6 m). Changes were made to the final design so the man's genitals were not visible. She had worked on the project since 1912, drawing various designs, including one seen by the committee's secretary. The Titanic design became her first large commission and one of her most notable. Sculptors John Horrigan and the Piccirilli Brothers created the statue with input from Henry Moreschi, another sculptor who had lost the commission to Whitney. The architect for the memorial was Henry Bacon, who previously designed the Lincoln Memorial, and the fabricator was R. B. Phelps Stone Company.

The statue, which Whitney described as having "a [facial] expression of sublime sacrifice", was completed in 1916. The statue and pedestal were carved from a 20-ton slab of granite. The erection of the memorial in Washington, D.C. was approved by Congress on March 3, 1917, and completed in 1918, but it would be years before the memorial was dedicated. Delays, including improvements to the site near the Potomac River and approval from various parties, were needed before a ceremony could take place. The United States Commission of Fine Arts approved plans for the site in 1919, but it took another six years before other agencies approved the final design and site. The statue was displayed in a New York City art gallery for more than ten years before it was finally installed in 1930. The memorial was dedicated the next year, the same year Whitney opened her Whitney Museum in New York City.

=== Dedication ===
The dedication of the memorial took place on May 26, 1931. Whitney was unable to attend due to an illness. Amongst those in attendance of the dedication were President Herbert Hoover and his wife, First Lady Lou Henry Hoover, Helen Herron Taft, members of the president's cabinet, and other guests of honor. Secretary of State Henry L. Stimson led the ceremony with a comment that Whitney's design of a man with his arms outstretched was reminiscent of Jesus' sacrifice by crucifixion. U.S. Representative Robert Luce praised the design and told the audience the memorial was "an enduring symbol of a characteristic of human nature that should be an inspiration for generations to come." He noted the heroism shown by many during the sinking of the Titanic and feared a future decline of such traits.

His speech was followed by the wife of Senator James W. Wadsworth Jr. officially handing over ownership of the memorial to the United States. Bishop James E. Freeman led the invocation and Taft, who was the first donor to the memorial, then unveiled the statue. As it was unveiled, the United States Marine Band played the national anthem and a sailor hoisted a flag above the statue. The crowd then sang My Country, 'Tis of Thee and a wreath was placed at the memorial by the wife of United States Department of State clerk, Robert S. Chew.

=== Later history ===
During the 1936 Northeastern United States flood, the memorial was damaged when the Potomac River overflowed. In 1966, the memorial was moved from its original location near the intersection of New Hampshire Avenue and Rock Creek and Potomac Parkway due to the construction of the John F. Kennedy Center for the Performing Arts. The memorial sat in a warehouse in Fort Washington, Maryland, for the next two years until a new site was found. It was moved to its current location in 1968 without another dedication ceremony. R. B. Phelps Stone Company served as the fabricator for the new site.

Beginning in 1978, a group of men mostly involved in local news operations began meeting at the memorial on each anniversary of the sinking. The group, known as the Men's Titanic Society, now annually holds a black-tie event to remember the men's sacrifice during the sinking. The memorial was added to the District of Columbia Inventory of Historic Sites on February 22, 2007, and listed on the National Register of Historic Places on October 12, 2007. It is one of five prominent outdoor sculptures in Washington made by women, and is a rare religious-themed work representing a non-religious subject. It is also one of four outdoor sculptures in Washington that are a form of representational art. Another artwork in the city, the Butt–Millet Memorial Fountain, is dedicated to two passengers who died on the Titanic: presidential aide Archibald Butt and artist Francis Davis Millet.

== Location and design ==
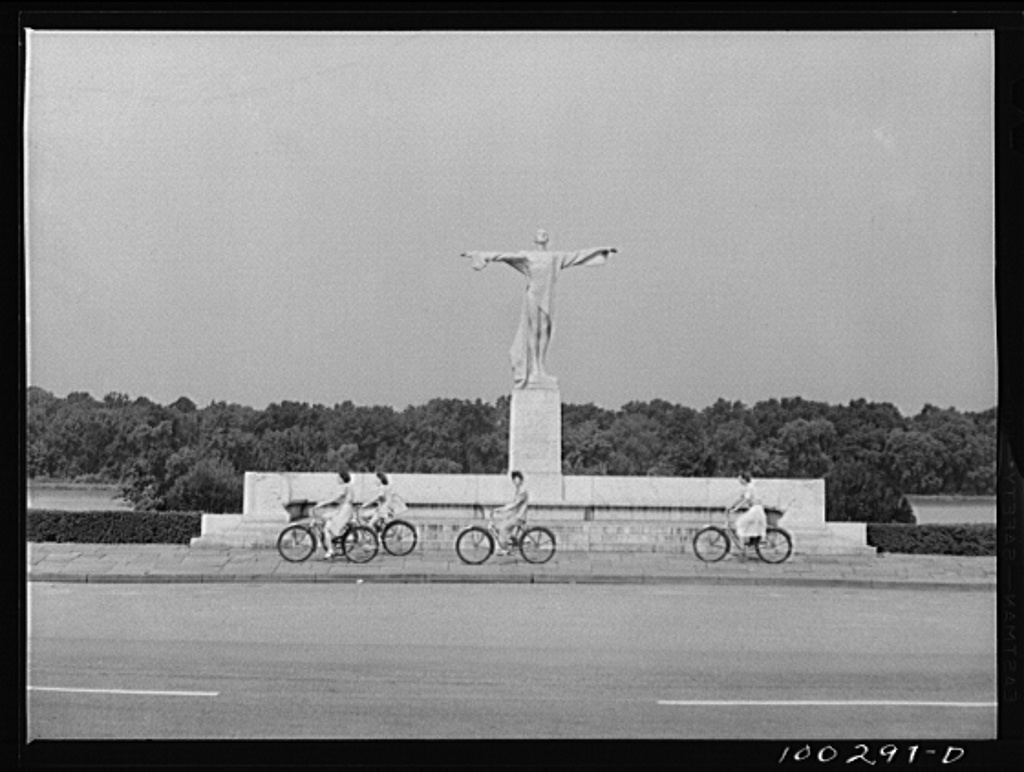
The memorial at its original location

The Titanic Memorial is located on Reservation 717 in the Southwest Waterfront Park, a public park near the intersection of 4th and P Streets SW, in the Southwest Waterfront neighborhood of Washington, D.C. The memorial is near Fort Lesley J. McNair, which is southeast of the park, across the Washington Channel from East Potomac Park, and is three blocks southwest from Waterfront station on the Washington Metro. The large Wharf mixed-use development lies just north of the park.

The sculpture, base, and platform are all pink granite while the foundation is concrete. There are three granite steps leading to the platform. The statue, which depicts a nude man draped with a robe, represents "Self Sacrifice". His arms are outstretched in the shape of a cross and his eyes are closed. He is standing on an uneven block above a relief of waves on the pedestal. It is possible the statue is the inspiration for Kate Winslet's character in Titanic, when she says "I'm flying, Jack!", but director James Cameron has never confirmed this. The statue is 12 feet (3.7 m) tall, 8 feet (2.4 m) wide, and 2 feet (0.6 m) long. It rests on a base which measures 5.5-feet (1.7 m) tall, and 4-feet (1.2 m) wide and long. The platform is 50 feet (15.2 m) long with a diameter of 13 feet (4 m). It includes an exedra, decorated on each end with a dolphin that features a bench.

=== Inscriptions ===
The following inscriptions are on the memorial:

Front:

TO THE BRAVE MEN WHO PERISHED IN THE TITANIC
APRIL 15 1912
THEY GAVE THEIR
LIVES THAT WOMEN
AND CHILDREN
MIGHT BE SAVED

ERECTED BY THE
WOMEN OF AMERICA

Side:

GERTRUDE VANDERBILT WHITNEY 1931

Back:

TO THE YOUNG AND THE OLD
THE RICH AND THE POOR
THE IGNORANT AND THE LEARNED
ALL
WHO GAVE THEIR LIVES NOBLY
TO SAVE WOMEN AND CHILDREN

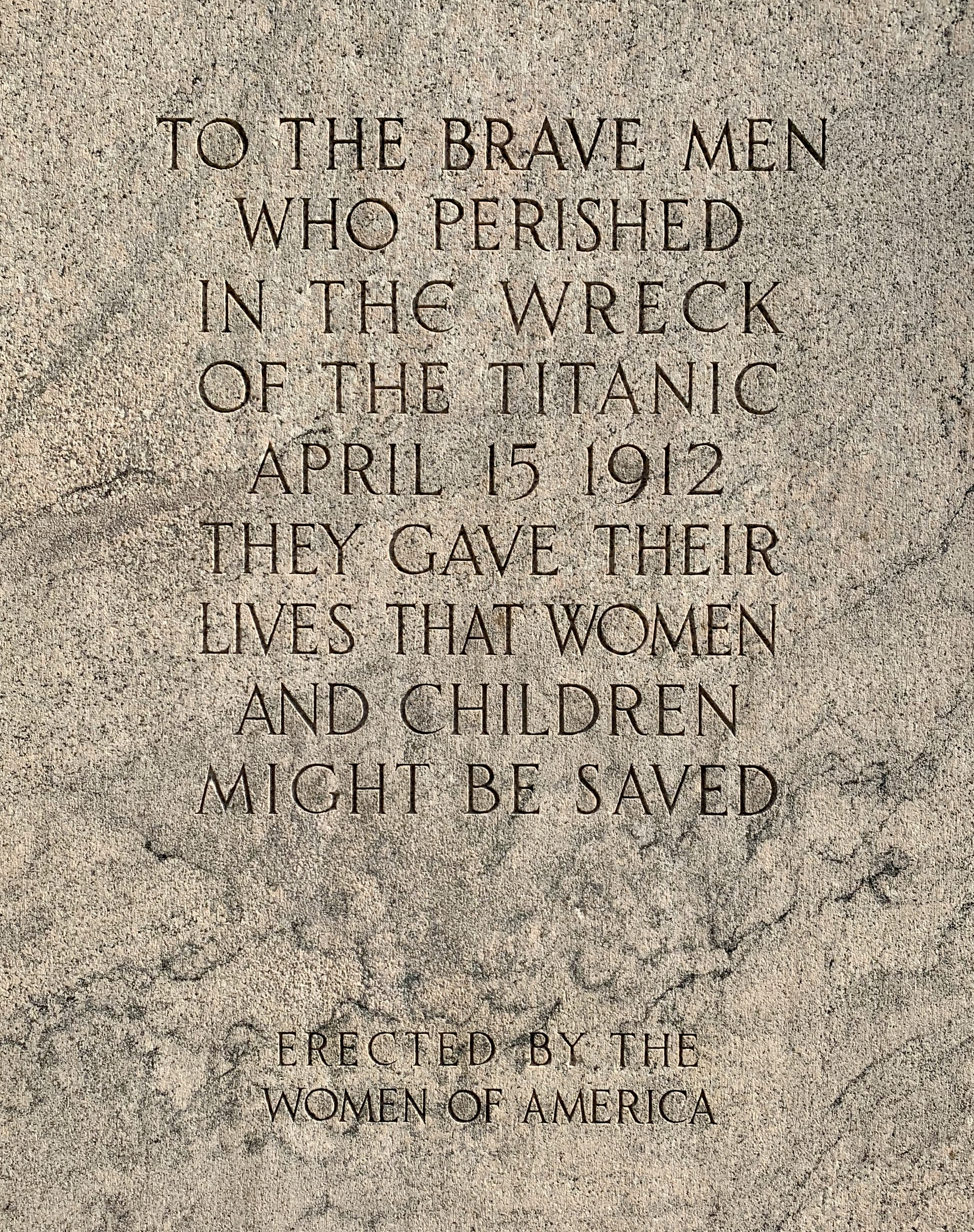
Front of the pedestal

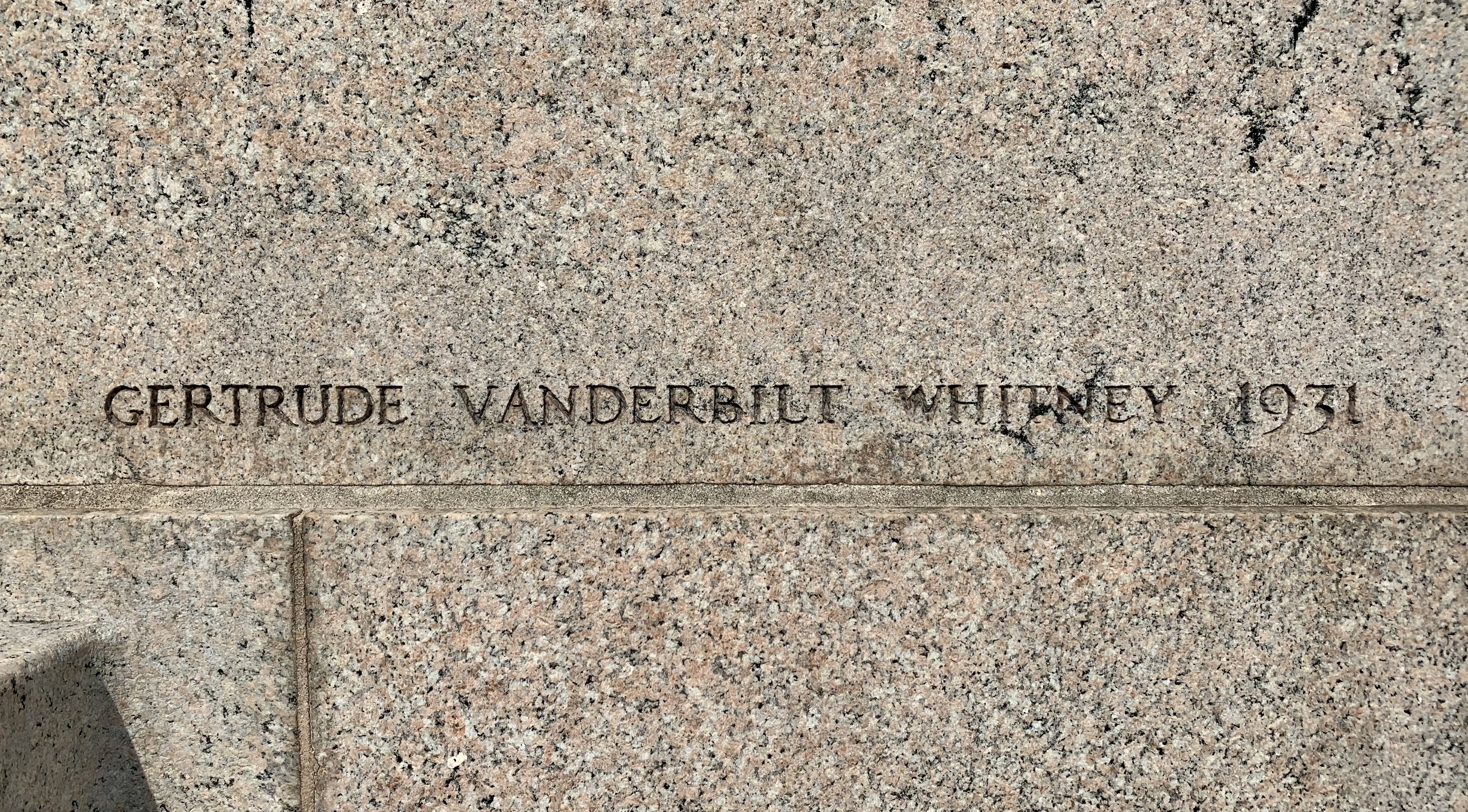
Side of the pedestal

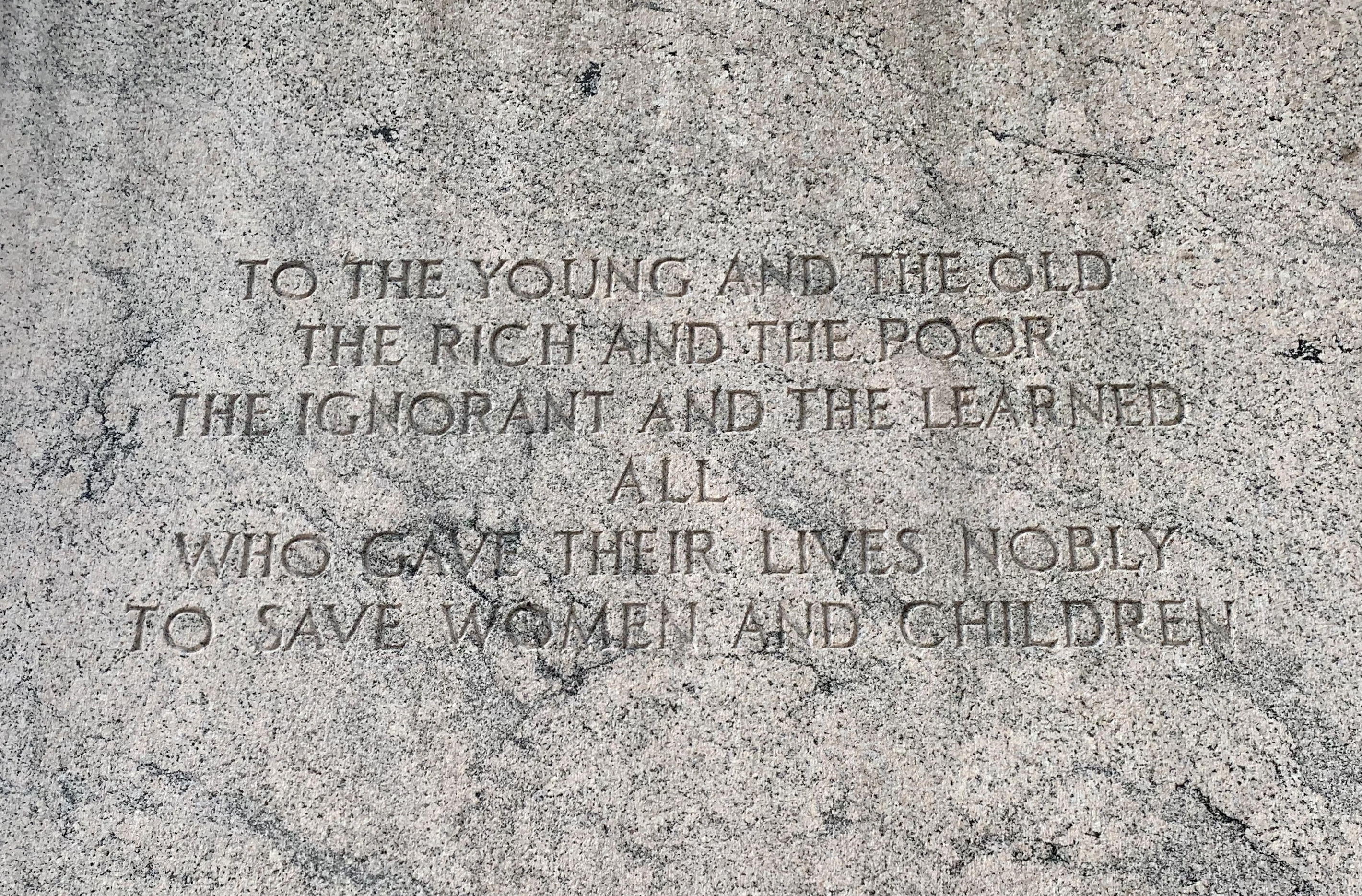
Back of the pedestal

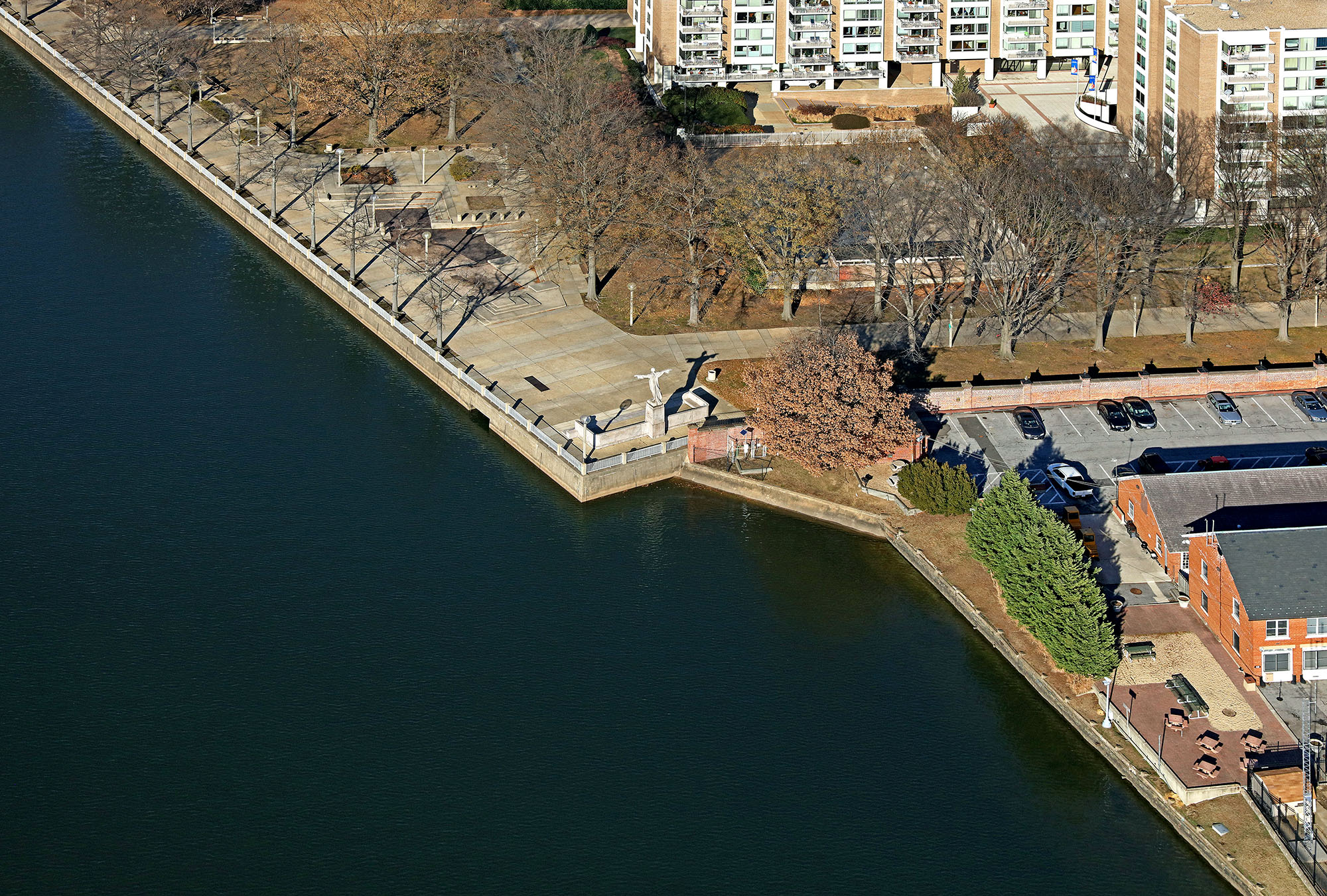
Aerial view of the memorial

== Notes ==
1. The historic landmark nomination form can be found at the bottom of the linked page in pdf format.

== See also ==
- List of public art in Washington, D.C., Ward 6
- Memorials and monuments to victims of the Titanic
