= Donald E. Wilkes Jr. =

American lawyer

- Born: July 30, 1944; Daytona Beach, Florida
- Died: June 7, 2019 (aged 74)
- Occupations: Author, Professor of Law

Donald Eugene Wilkes Jr. (July 30, 1944 – June 7, 2019) from Daytona Beach, Florida) was professor of law at the University of Georgia School of Law.

A graduate of the University of Florida (B.A., 1965; J.D., 1969) Wilkes became professor of law at the University of Georgia in 1971. He was a member of the State Bar of Georgia starting in 1972 and in 1975–1976 was a fellow in Law and the Humanities at Harvard University Law School.

An authority on the law of Habeas corpus, Wilkes's work State Postconviction Remedies and Relief Handbook was cited by the U.S. Supreme Court in the case Wall v. Kholi 131 S.Ct. 1278 (U.S. 2011).

Wilkes is credited with the introduction of the term New Federalism in relation to criminal procedure in the United States in a series of essays in the Kentucky law Journal in the mid 1970s.

Wilkes retired from University of Georgia School of Law in 2012. He died, aged 74, on June 7, 2019.
