= Butt–Millet Memorial Fountain =

Artwork by Thomas Hastings and Daniel Chester French

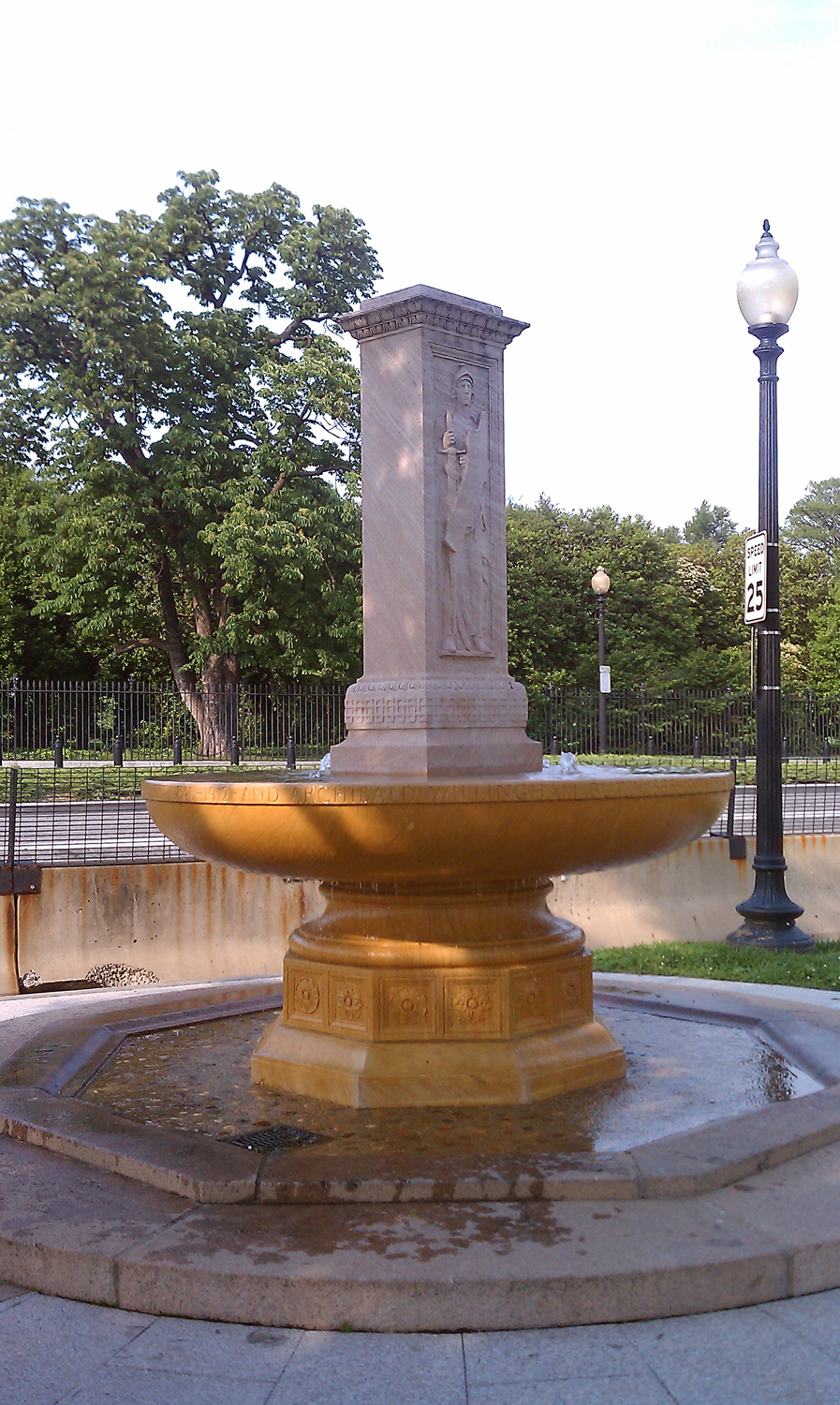
- Interactive map of Butt–Millet Memorial Fountain
- Location: President's Park, Washington, D.C.
- Coordinates: 38.895269°N 77.037461°W
- Designer: Thomas Hastings, designer Daniel Chester French, bas-reliefs
- Type: Fountain and sculpture
- Material: Tennessee marble base, granite column
- Width: 8 ft (2.4 m)
- Height: 12 ft (3.7 m)
- Completion date: 1913
- Dedicated to: Archibald Butt; Francis Davis Millet

The Butt–Millet Memorial Fountain is a memorial fountain in President's Park in Washington, D.C., in the United States. Dedicated in October 1913, it commemorates the deaths of Archibald Butt (the military aide to President William Howard Taft) and Francis Davis Millet (a journalist and painter, and Butt's close friend and housemate). Both men died during the sinking of the RMS Titanic on April 15, 1912.

== Genesis of the memorial fountain ==
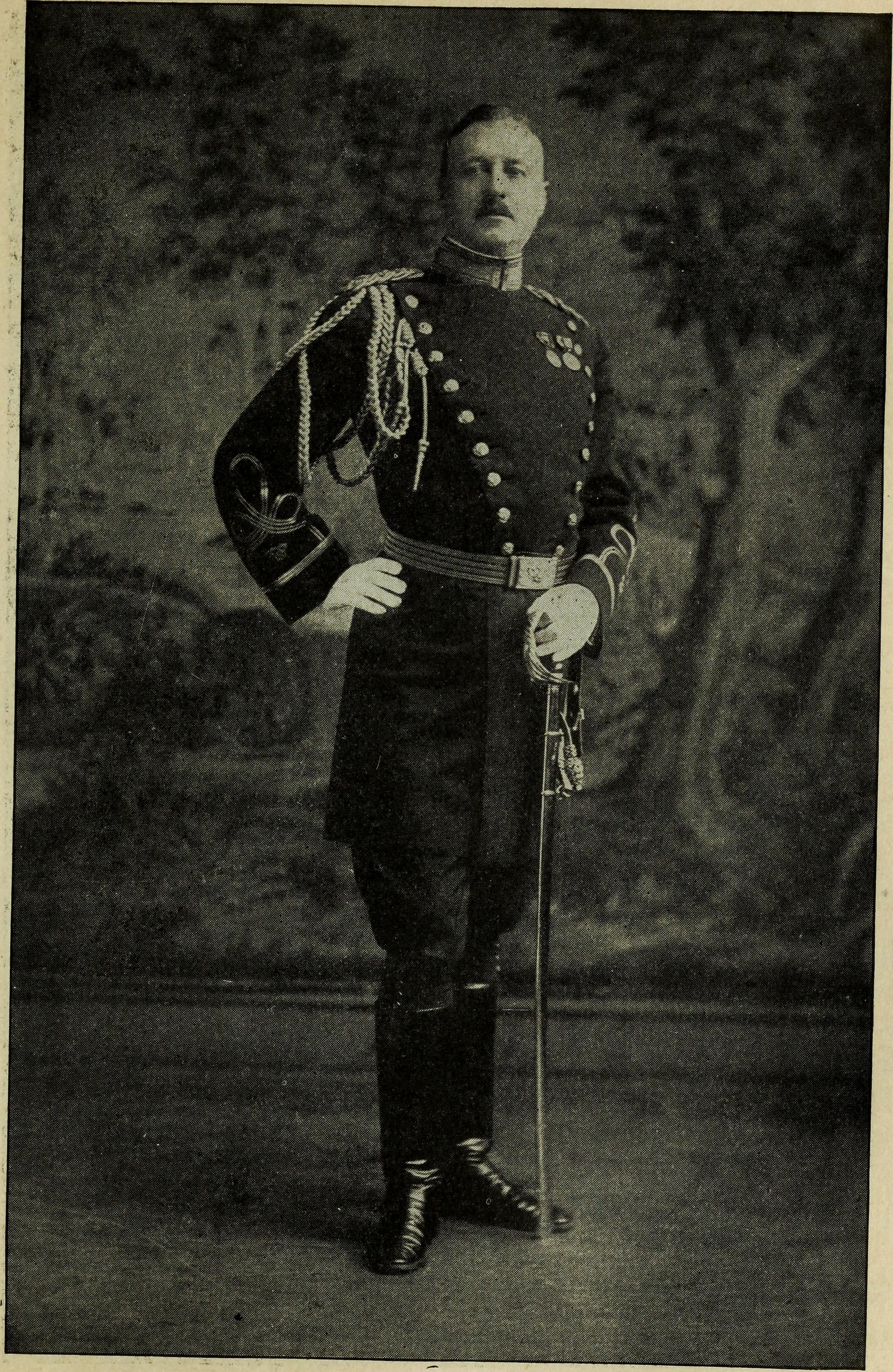
Major Archibald Butt, ca. 1912

Archibald Butt was a captain in the United States Army Quartermaster Corps who had served in the Philippines (from 1898 to 1904), in Washington, D.C. (from 1904 to 1906), and in Cuba (from 1906 to 1908). Theodore Roosevelt had become acquainted with Butt's logistics and animal husbandry work in the Philippines and was impressed by his hard work and thoughtfulness. Taft had served as chair of the Second Philippine Commission (the body which was organizing a civilian government in the country in the wake of the Spanish–American War and the first battles of the Philippine–American War) from 1900 to 1901 and as Governor-General of the Philippines from 1901 to 1904. Taft knew Butt well from their time together overseas. Roosevelt asked Butt to serve as his military aide in April 1908. When Taft became president in March 1909, he asked Butt to stay on as military aide. Butt proved to have strong negotiating skills and a good head for numbers, which enabled him to become Taft's de facto chief negotiator on federal budget issues. In 1911, Butt was promoted to the rank of major.

Butt lived in a large mansion at 2000 G Street NW that was later sold to Senator Underwood from Alabama in 1914. Since about 1910, Butt and Millet had lived together in the house. (Millet's wife, Lily, resided in the Millet home in Italy.) "Millet, my artist friend who lives with me" was Butt's designation for his companion. They were known for throwing spartan but large parties that were attended by members of Congress, justices of the Supreme Court, and President Taft himself. Newspapers characterized the intense, deep friendship the men shared as a "Damon and Pythias" relationship. There is some speculation that Butt and Millet were gay lovers. Historian Richard Davenport-Hines wrote in 2012:

The enduring partnership of Butt and Millet was an early case of "Don't ask, don't tell." Washington insiders tried not to focus too closely on the men's relationship, but they recognized their mutual affection. And they were together in death as in life.

By 1912, Taft's first term was coming to an end. Roosevelt, who had fallen out with Taft, was known to be considering a run for president against him. Close to both men and fiercely loyal, Butt began to suffer from depression and exhaustion. Millet (himself one of Taft's circle) asked Taft to give him a leave of absence to recuperate before the presidential primaries began. Taft agreed and ordered Butt to go on vacation. Butt left on a six-week vacation to Europe on March 1, 1912, accompanied by Millet. Butt booked passage on the RMS Titanic for his return to the United States. He boarded the Titanic on April 10, 1912; Millet boarded the ship at Cherbourg, France, later that same day. Butt and Millet were playing cards on the night of April 14 in the first-class smoking room when the Titanic struck an iceberg. The ship sank two and half hours later, with a loss of over 1,500 lives.

Both Butt and Millet went down with the Titanic. Butt's remains were never found. Millet's body was recovered on April 27, and he was buried in East Bridgewater, Massachusetts.

Taft was devastated by Butt's death. When he learned Butt had not survived, he "broke down and wept, 'his whole body was shaken with convulsive sobs'." On May 2, 1912, a memorial service was held in the Butt family home in Augusta, Georgia. Taft spoke at the service, almost breaking down twice as he said:

If Archie could have selected a time to die he would have chosen the one God gave him. His life was spent in self–sacrifice, serving others. His forgetfulness of self had become a part of his nature. Everybody who knew him called him Archie. I couldn't prepare anything in advance to say here. I tried, but couldn't. He was too near me. He was loyal to my predecessor, Mr. Roosevelt, who selected him to be military aide, and to me he had become as a son or a brother.

A second ceremony was held in Washington, D.C., on May 5, during which Taft broke down and wept—bringing his eulogy to an abrupt end.

=== Building the memorial ===
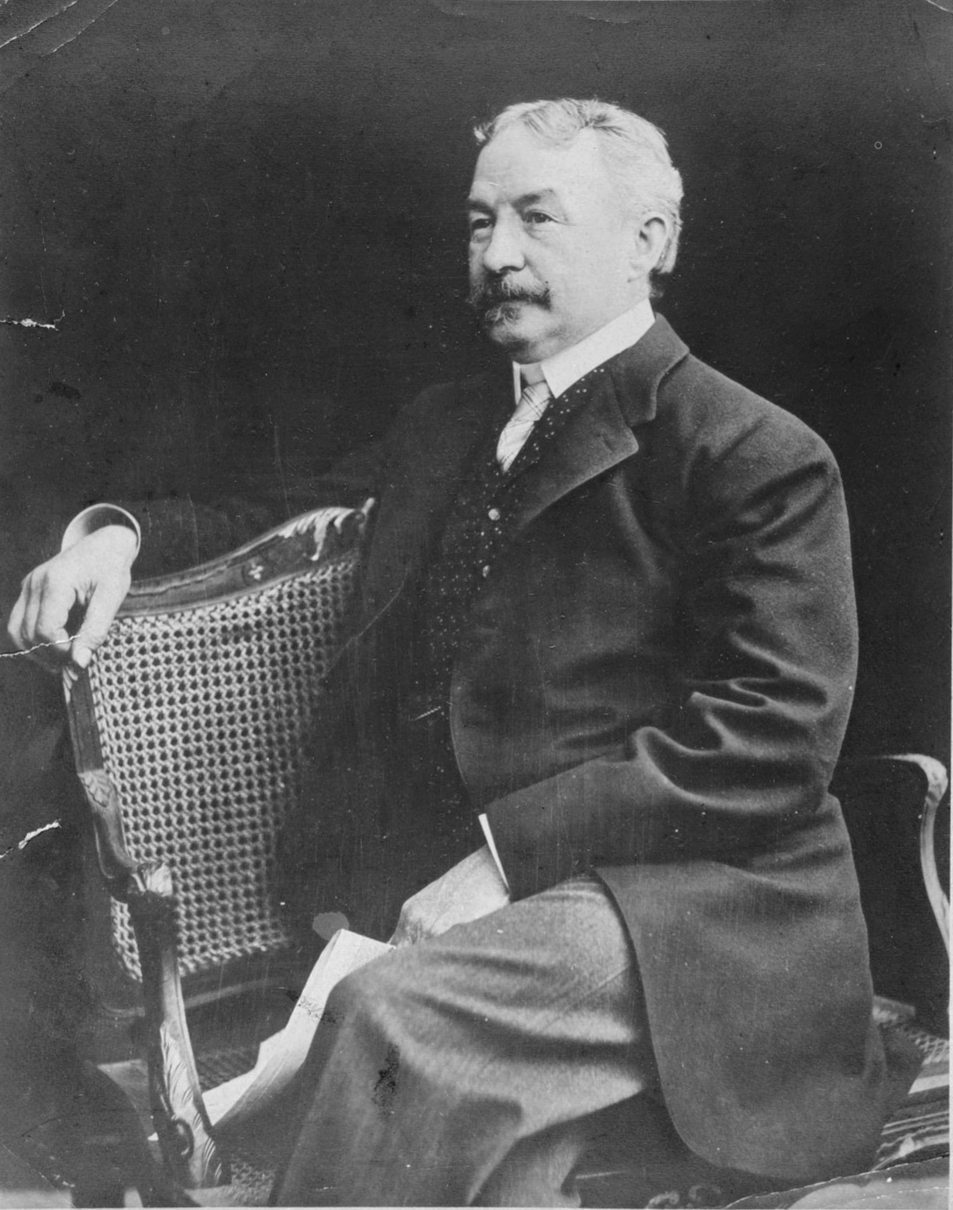
Francis Davis Millet, ca. 1910

On May 16, 1912, Senator Augustus Octavius Bacon of Georgia submitted a resolution in the U.S. Senate authorizing private persons to construct a memorial to Butt and Millet on federally owned land somewhere in the District of Columbia. Bacon argued that Butt (who was an aide to the president) and Millet (who was vice chair of the United States Commission of Fine Arts at the time of his death) were both public servants who deserved to be memorialized separately from the rest of the dead. Bacon also said that a number of memorials in the city had been financed by private dollars, and the Butt–Millet memorial would be no different. As originally introduced, the resolution barred the memorial from being placed on the grounds of the Capitol, Library of Congress, or White House. Bacon asked that the resolution be adopted by the Senate immediately, but Senator William Borah objected and the resolution was referred to the Committee on the Library (which had the authority to accept any work of the fine art on behalf of Congress and designate a location for its placement).

Plans for erecting a memorial to Butt and Millet began shortly after the introduction of the Senate resolution. Taft agreed to chair the memorial committee. Taft's personal secretary, Charles D. Hilles, and his military aide, Colonel Spencer Cosby, led the fund-raising on behalf of the committee. Charles J. Bell of the American Security and Trust Company was the treasurer. Members of the foreign diplomatic corps and several high government officials had already donated several thousand dollars to the memorial fund by mid-May. Taft himself had made the first contribution. At this point in time, The Ellipse (the southern part of President's Park) was chosen for the site of the memorial. However, the memorial committee was thinking only of erecting a bronze tablet.

An attempt to pass the resolution on June 8 failed after Senator Porter J. McCumber objected to its passage. The committee favorably reported the resolution on August 10, 1912, and the Senate adopted the resolution on August 12. The House of Representatives received the committee's report on August 22, and passed the legislation the following day. As enacted, the resolution removed the restriction on the memorial's location. Taft signed the legislation into law on August 24.

During work on the congressional legislation, the memorial commission altered its plans. Despite press reports that the memorial would be a bronze tablet, a fund-raising letter issued in May 1912 by the memorial commission said the memorial's final form had not been chosen. That changed in early June, when the commission decided to add a fountain to the tablet. The memorial commission had also settled on Thomas Hastings and Daniel Chester French as the memorial's designers. By late August 1912, the commission eliminated the tablet in favor of just a fountain. By April 1913, the memorial commission had added a shaft with two bas-relief figures—one representing chivalry (Butt) and one representing art (Millet).

By law, both the President and the Commission of Fine Arts had to approve the location and design of the memorial. Both approvals were given, and work on the foundation for the fountain began on June 18, 1913. Just over $3,000 was spent constructing the memorial fountain. Hastings and French donated their services.

Initial press reports in 1912 indicated that Taft planned an elaborate dedication ceremony for the memorial. But Taft was no longer president by late 1913, having lost the presidential election to Woodrow Wilson. The Butt–Millet Memorial Fountain was dedicated without ceremony on October 25, 1913.

Among the donors to the memorial were John Dustin Archbold, Henry Bacon, Daniel Burnham, Arno B. Cammerer, Champ Clark, Kenyon Cox, Frank Miles Day, Theodore N. Ely, William Corcoran Eustis, Charles Lang Freer, Henry Clay Frick, Cass Gilbert, Eugene Hale, Henry Lee Higginson, Samuel Isham, Jean Jules Jusserand, Seth Low, Henry Rutgers Marshall, Gari Melchers, Count Helmuth von Moltke, Charles Nagel, Frederick Law Olmsted, William Church Osborn, Charles A. Platt, Henry Kirke Porter, David F. Sellers, Henry L. Stimson, Louis Comfort Tiffany, Francis E. Warren, George P. Wetmore, Post Wheeler, George W. Wickersham, Blanton Winship, and John Sharp Williams.

== About the memorial ==
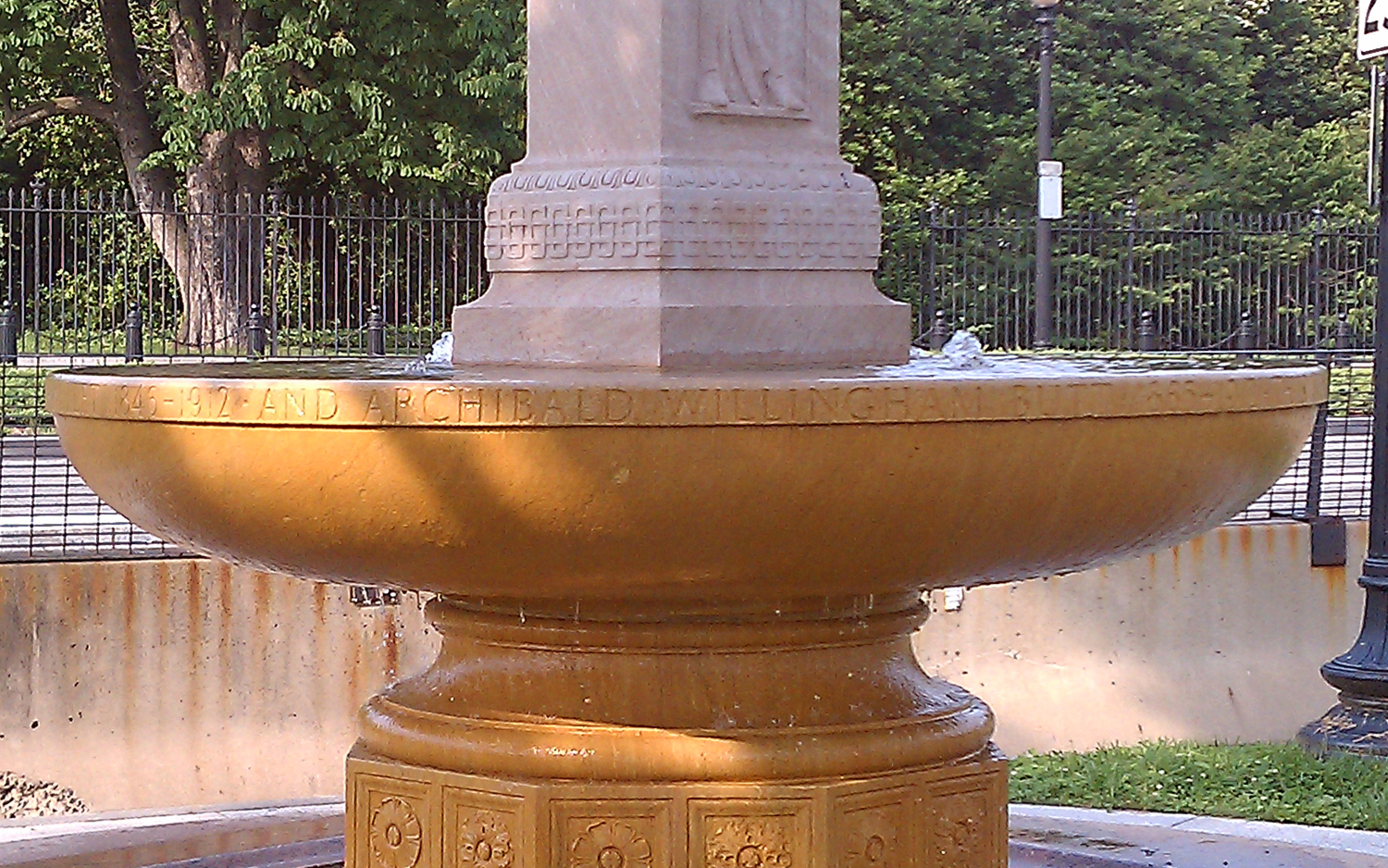
Detail of the inscription on the memorial fountain

The Butt–Millet Memorial Fountain is located in the northwestern portion of the Ellipse, at the western junction of Ellipse Road NW and E Street NW. The First Division Monument is to the northwest, and the south lawn of the White House is across the street to the north and northeast.

The Butt–Millet Memorial Fountain is 12 feet (3.7 m) high. An octagonal grey granite base supports an 8 feet (2.4 m) wide bowl of golden brown Tennessee marble. A grey granite Neoclassical column rises from the center of the bowl. Two figures in low bas-relief are depicted, one on the north and one on the south side of the column. The northern figure of a woman with paint brush and palette, represents the fine arts. The southern figure of a man in armor and helmet, holding a shield, represents military valor. Four globes in the bowl surround the granite column and emit water, which cascades over the edge of the bowl into a shallow receptacle in the grey granite base. The fountain bowl was designed to be a source of drinking water for horses used by park police patrols.

An inscription around the lip of the bowl reads: "In memory of Francis Davis Millet – 1846–1912 – and Archibald Willingham Butt – 1865–1912. This monument has been erected by their friends with the sanction of Congress."

== See also ==
- List of public art in Washington, D.C., Ward 2
- Public sculptures by Daniel Chester French
- Titanic Memorial (Washington, D.C.)

== Bibliography ==
- Abbott, Lawrence F. "Introduction." In Butt, Archibald Willingham. The Letters of Archie Butt, Personal Aide to President Roosevelt. Lawrence F. Abbott, ed. Garden City, N.Y.: Doubleday, 1924.
- Brewster, Hugh. Gilded Lives, Fatal Voyage: The Titanic's First-Class Passengers and Their World. New York: Random House, 2012.
- Carrier, Thomas J. Washington D.C.: A Historical Walking Tour. Charleston, S.C.: Arcadia Publishing, 1999.
- Committee on the Library. Joint Memorial to Maj. Archibald W. Butt and Francis Davis Millet. To accompany S.J. Resolution 108. Rept. No. 866. 62d Cong., 2d sess. June 8, 1912.
- Evelyn, Douglas E.; Dickson, Paul; and Ackerman, S.J. On This Spot: Pinpointing the Past in Washington, D.C. 3rd rev. ed. Sterling, Va.: Capital Books, 2008. ISBN 1-933102-70-5
- The Fountain in Memory of Francis Davis Millet, Archibald Willingham Butt. Washington, D.C.: [no publisher listed], 1913.
- Garrison, Webb B. A Treasury of Titanic Tales. Nashville, Tenn: Rutledge Hill Press, 1998.
- Lynch, Don. Titanic: An Illustrated History. New York: Hyperion, 1993.
- Schemmel, William. Georgia Curiosities: Quirky Characters, Roadside Oddities & Other Offbeat Stuff. Guilford, Conn.: Globe Pequot Press, 2011.
- Stephenson, George M. American History Since 1865. New York: Harper & Bros., 1939.
- Tompkins, Sally K. and Boucher, Jack E. A Quest for Grandeur: Charles Moore and the Federal Triangle. Washington, D.C.: Smithsonian Institution Press, 1993.
