= Titanic Memorial (New York City) =

Lighthouse in Manhattan, New York

Coordinates: 40°42′27″N 74°00′14″W

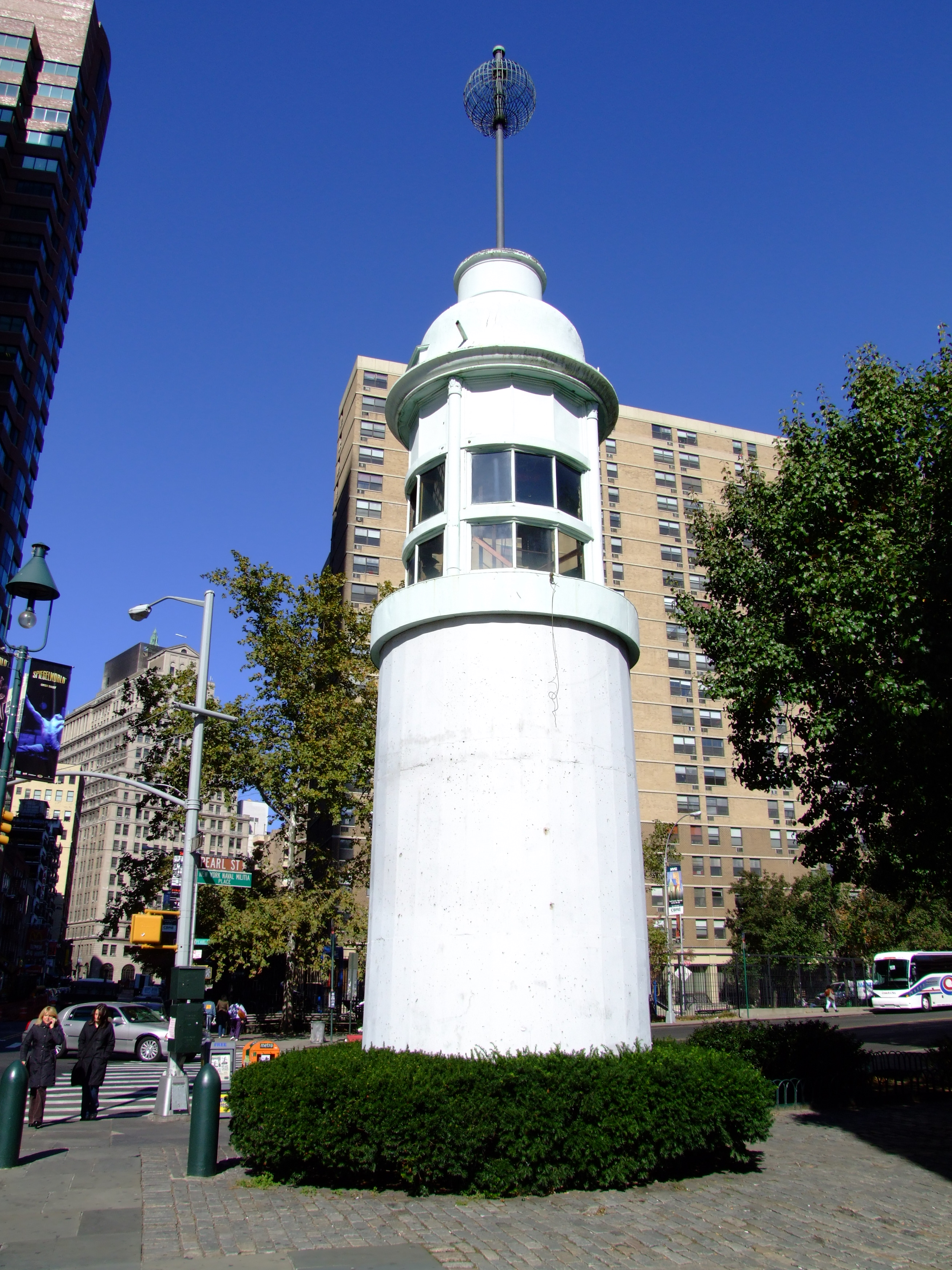
Titanic Memorial Lighthouse

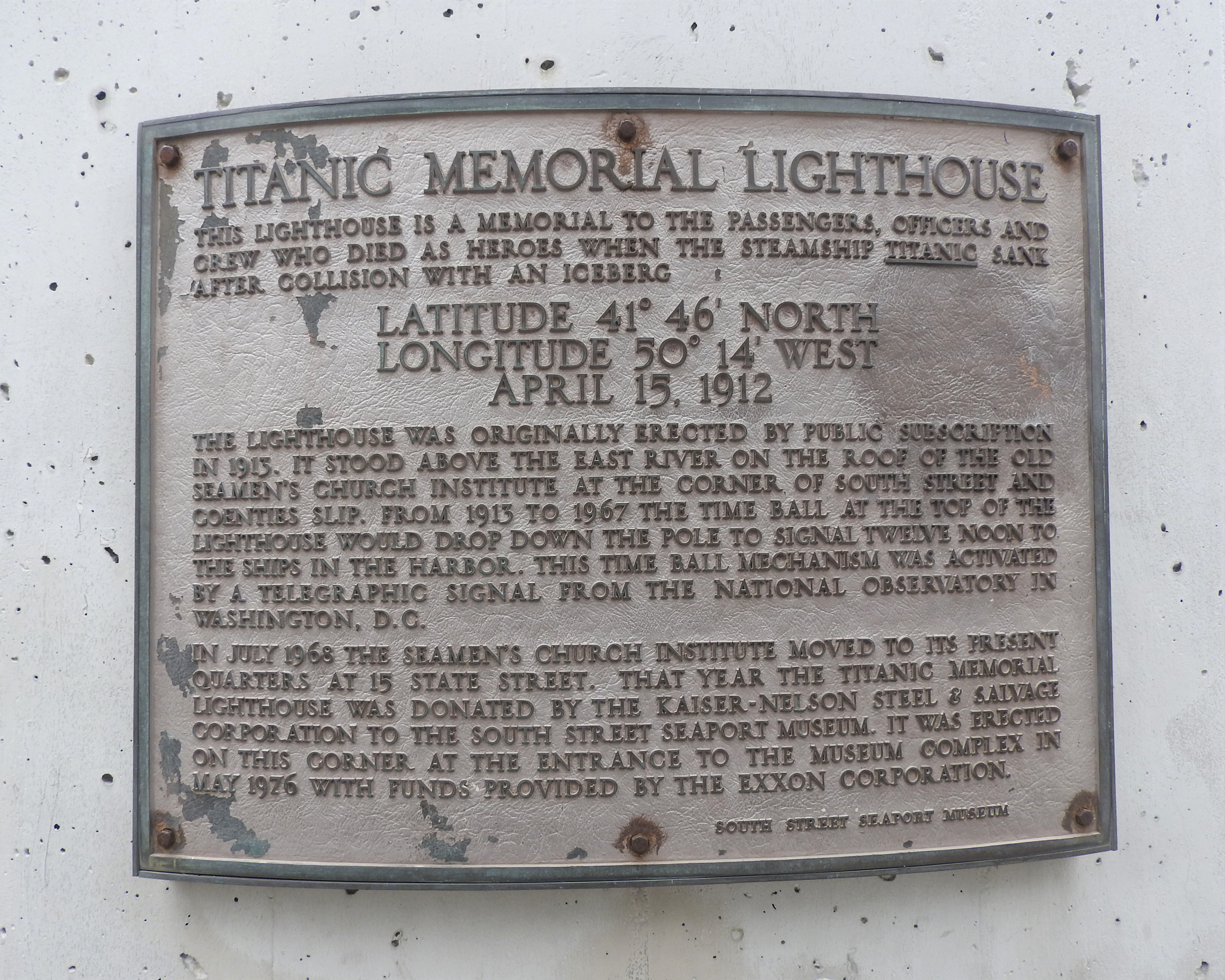
Dedication plaque on the Lighthouse

The Titanic Memorial is a 60-foot-tall (18 m) lighthouse at Fulton and Pearl Streets in the Financial District of Lower Manhattan in New York City. It was built, in part at the instigation of Margaret Brown, to remember the people who died on the RMS Titanic on April 15, 1912. It has a time ball.

== History ==
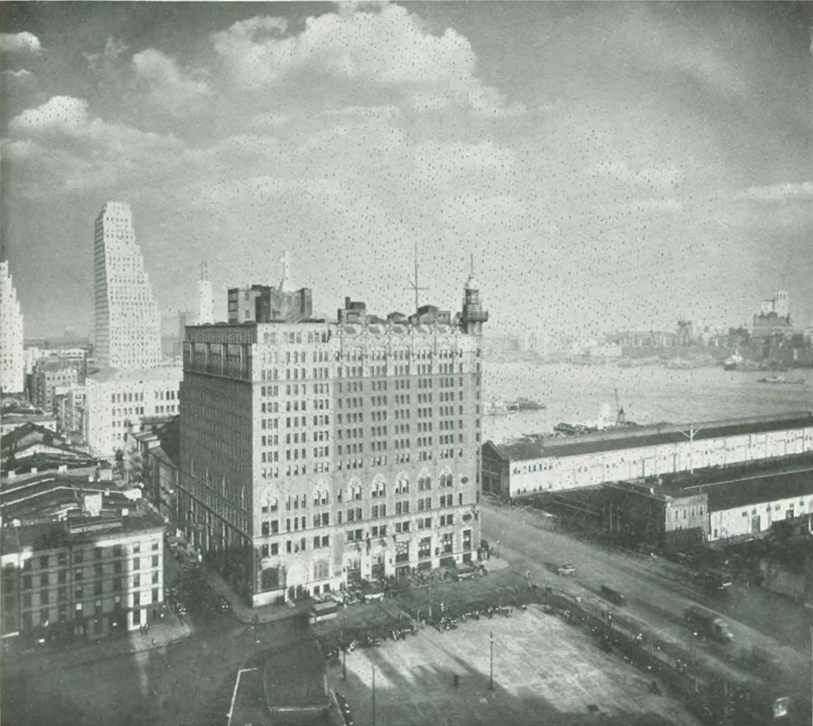
The Seaman's Church Institute of New York building in about 1934, with the lighthouse and time ball atop the building

The lighthouse was originally erected by public subscription and was formally dedicated on April 15, 1913, the one-year anniversary of the sinking, with an address given by Episcopal bishop David H. Greer. It stood above the East River on the roof of the old Seamen's Church Institute of New York and New Jersey at the corner of South Street and Coenties Slip. From 1913 to 1967, a time ball at the top of the lighthouse would be raised to the top of the rod and dropped down the pole to signal twelve noon to ships in New York Harbor; the time ball mechanism was activated by a telegraphic signal transmitted from the Naval Observatory in Washington, D.C.

In July 1968, the Seamen's Church Institute moved to 15 State Street. That year, the Titanic Memorial Lighthouse was donated by the Kaiser-Nelson Steel & Salvage Corporation to the South Street Seaport Museum. It was erected at the entrance to the museum complex, on the corner of Fulton and Pearl streets, in May 1976, with funds provided by the Exxon Corporation. Charles Evans Hughes III was the architect for the 1976 re-erection of the New York City Titanic Memorial.

In 2019, plans for a restoration were laid by the Friends of Titanic Lighthouse Restoration, whose members include descendants of Titanic victims and survivors. In 2022, they talked about a potential Titanic museum on Pier 16. In April 2023, the Seaport Museum announced that it had hired architects Jan Hird Pokorny Associates to handle a restoration to be completed in 2024.

== Other memorials ==
- Straus Park, 6 miles (9.7 km) away on the Upper West Side of Manhattan at Broadway and West 106th Street, is a memorial to Ida and Isidor Straus, who died on Titanic.
- Memorials and monuments to victims of the Titanic
