= Phillips Memorial Cloister =

Titanic memorial to the Jack Phillips in Surrey

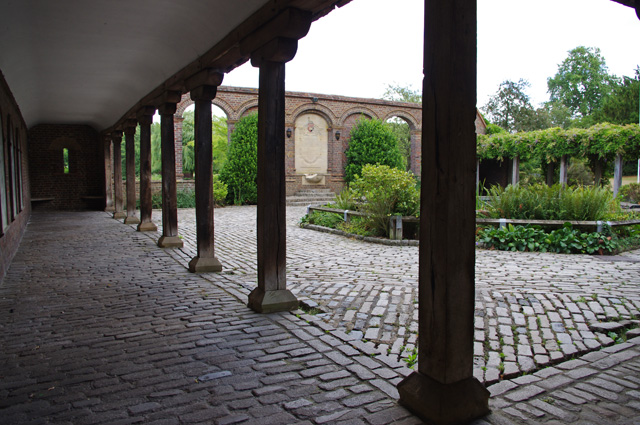
- Inside the cloister

General information
- Type: Memorial
- Location: Godalming, Surrey, England
- Coordinates: 51.1878°N 0.6161°W
- Year built: 1913

Listed Building – Grade II
- Official name: Phillips Memorial Cloister
- Designated: 01 February 1991
- Reference no.: 1044566

The Phillips Memorial Cloister is a Grade II listed memorial in Godalming, Surrey, dedicated to Jack Phillips, a senior wireless operator who worked for the Marconi Company aboard the Titanic.

The memorial was built in 1913 following Phillips' death aboard the Titanic, located alongside the Phillips Memorial Garden in the church grounds of St Peter's and St Paul's in Godalming. Restoration work was carried out in 2012 for the centenary of the Titanic's sinking. By around that time it had become popular with visitors as well as researchers. It has been said to be the largest memorial associated with the sinking of the Titanic.

The memorial bears an inscription that reads:

S.O.S
This cloister is built
in memory of
John George Phillips
a native of this town
Chief wireless telegraphist of
the ill-fated S.S. Titanic
he died at his post
when the vessel foundered
in mid-Atlantic
on the 15th day of
April 1912

== Jack Phillips ==
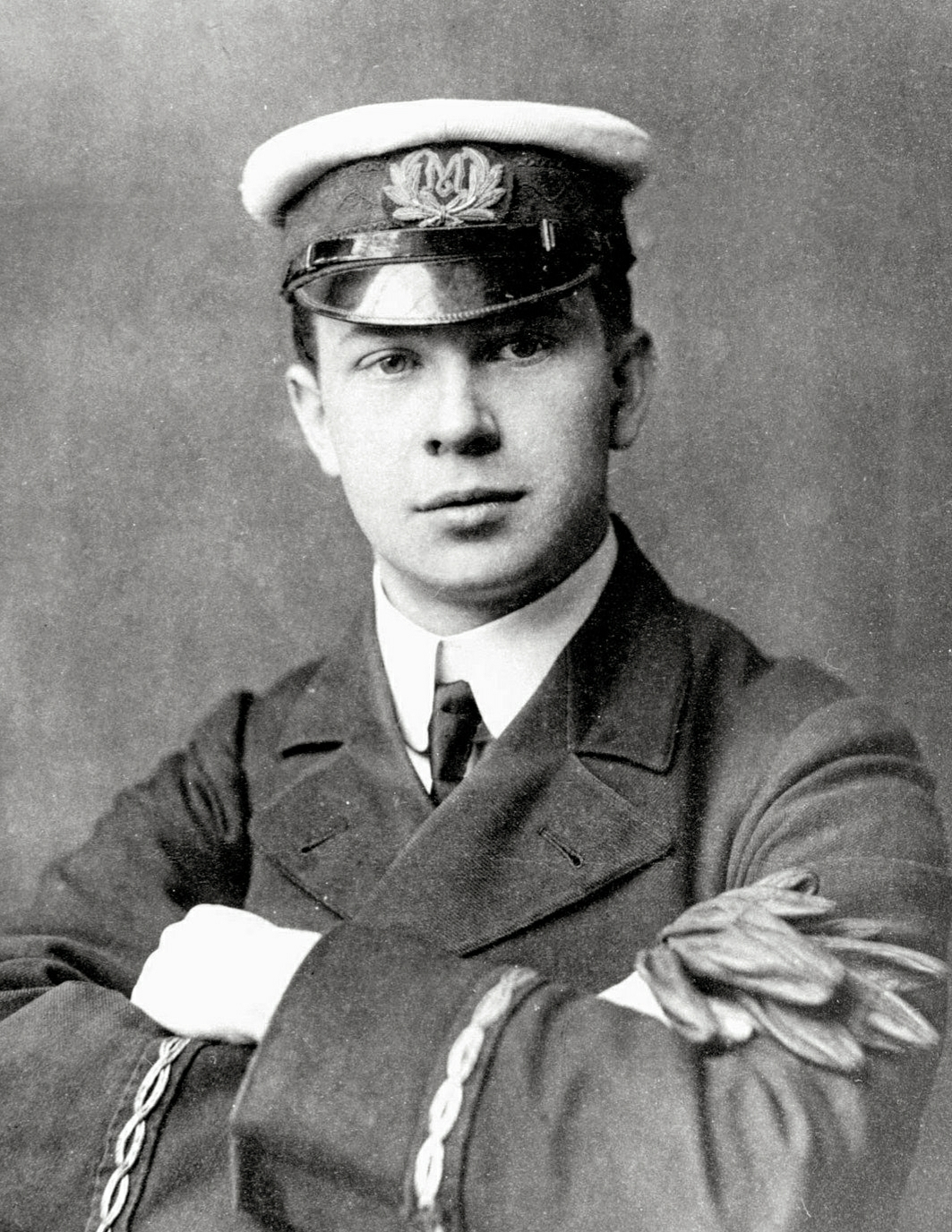
Jack Phillips c. 1910

Jack Phillips was born in 1887 at 11 Farncombe street, nearby to the current site of the memorial cloister and went on to join the Marconi Company in 1906.

On its maiden voyage, Phillips held the post of Chief Wireless telegraphist aboard the Titanic alongside his junior Harold Bride who would survive.

Jack played a vital role in calling for help from nearby ships and has been celebrated as a hero with his story gaining public attention, and was personally revered for his sense of duty by Bride. He stayed at his post even after he was officially relieved by Captain Smith, inspiring Bride to do the same.

The final message sent by Jack aboard the Titanic was sent out and received by the RMS Virginian three minutes before its sinking.
