= List of works by Thomas Taylor =

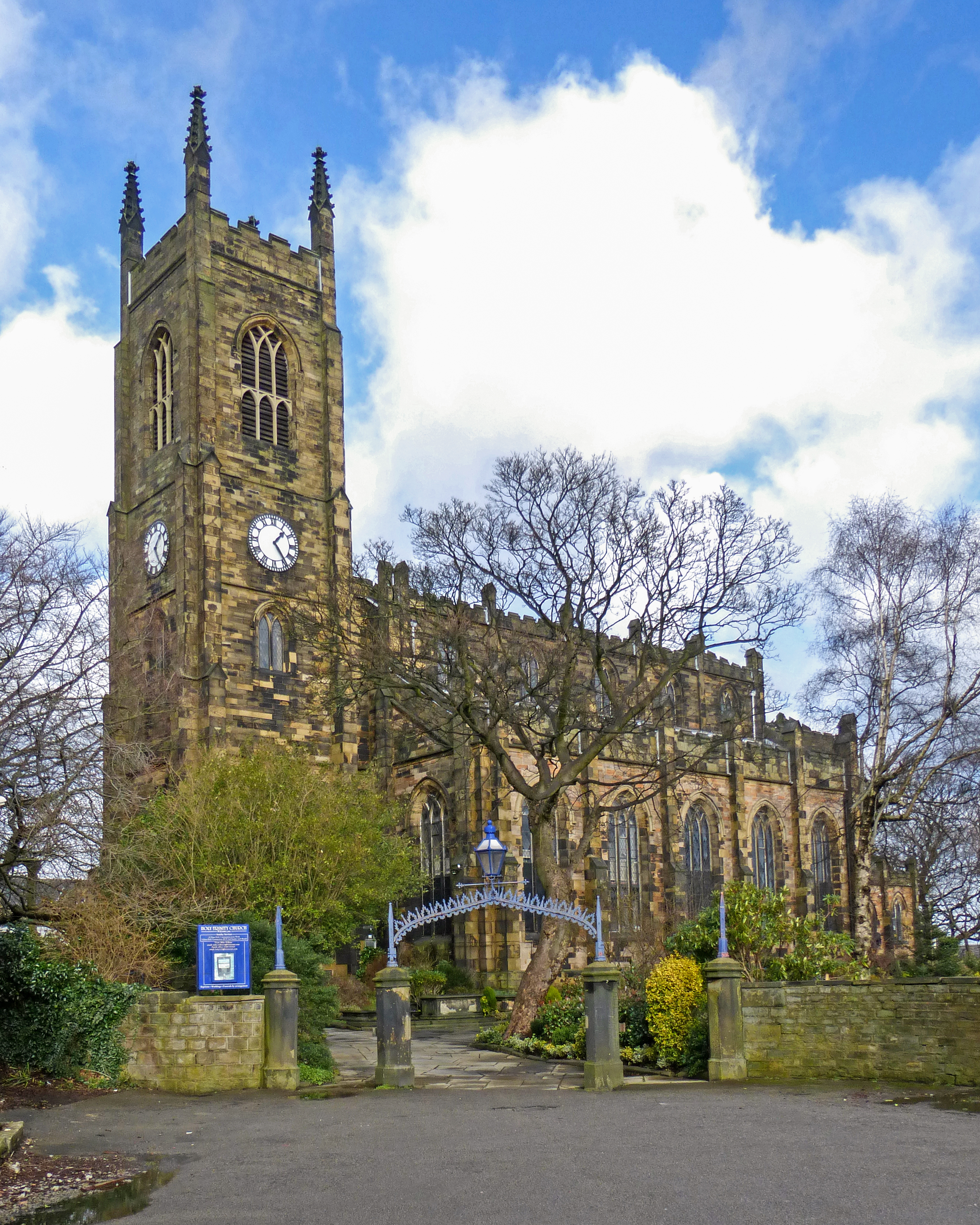
Holy Trinity Church, Huddersfield

Thomas Taylor (1777/78–1826) was an English artist and architect. He first worked in the London office of James Wyatt, and later moved to Leeds, West Yorkshire, where he established an architectural practice. His major works were the design of churches in the vicinity of his office, in Yorkshire and Lancashire. Taylor was a pioneer in the use of the Gothic Revival style for church architevcture, and received seven commissions for Commissioners' churches.

== Key ==
Grade	Criteria
Grade I	Buildings of exceptional interest.
Grade II*	Particularly important buildings of more than special interest.
Grade II	Buildings of special interest.

== Works ==
Name	Location	Photograph	Date	Notes	Grade
Leeds Parish Church	Leeds, West Yorkshire; 53.7952°N 1.5360°W	—	1808–1812	Rebuilt the south side in Gothic Revival style, including a large window in the transept. The church was replaced by the current church in 1837–41.	—
Stables, Woolley Hall	Woolley, West Yorkshire; 53.6135°N 1.5058°W	—	c. 1810	Later used as accommodation for a residential college.	II
Court House	Leeds, West Yorkshire	—	1811–1813	In Neoclassical style, incorporating a portico with four Corinthian columns.	—
Christ Church	Liversedge, West Yorkshire; 53.7118°N 1.6942°W		1812–1816	Taylor's first church, large with a west tower, aisles, a clerestory, and chancel relatively large for the time.	II
Christ Church	Bradford, West Yorkshire	—	c. 1813–1815	A church with a smaller chancel than Liversedge. It was demolished in 1878.	—
St Bartholomew's Church	Colne, Lancashire; 53.8573°N 2.1703°W		1815	Repairs.	I
St Chad's Church	Rochdale, Greater Manchester; 53.6147°N 2.1577°W		1815–16	Repairs.	II*
Church of St Mary the Blessed Virgin	Luddenden, West Yorkshire; 53.7324°N 1.9388°W		1815–1817	A new church replacing an earlier church on the site.	II
Church of St Anne in the Grove	Southowram, West Yorkshire; 53.7093°N 1.8191°W		1815–1818	A new church, the chancel being added later.	II
Holy Trinity Church	Huddersfield, West Yorkshire; 53.6499°N 1.7929°W		1816–1819	A new church with a prominent west tower.	II*
Holy Trinity Church	Littleborough, Greater Manchester; 53.6443°N 2.0939°W		1818–1820	Rebuilt the church, replacing a chapel of ease dating from 1471. Taylor added a new gallery in 1822–23. The chancel was added in 1889 by J. S. Crowther.	II
Holy Trinity Church	Ossett, West Yorkshire; 53.6860°N 1.5828°W	—	1821	Extended a church that had been built in 1806. This church was demolished and replaced in 1862–65.	—
Gildersome Chapel	Gildersome, West Yorkshire; 53.7607°N 1.6356°W	—	1821–22	Added a new gallery to a chapel dating from 1707. The chapel was replaced in 1866.	—
St Lawrence's Church	Pudsey, West Yorkshire; 53.7934°N 1.6668°W		1821–1824	A Commissioners' church built to replace a former chapel of ease.	II
Christ Church	Attercliffe, Sheffield, South Yorkshire		1821–1826	A Commissioners' church with a tower. Bombed in 1940; demolished other than the tower 1950.	—
St Philip's Church	Shalesmoor, Sheffield, South Yorkshire	—	1821–1828	A Commissioners' church with a tower. Demolished in 1952.	> —
Christ Church	Woodhouse Hill, Huddersfield, West Yorkshire; 53.6675°N 1.7693°W		1823–24	A new church with transepts and a west tower surmounted by a broach spire.	II
St Paul's Church	Hanging Heaton, Batley, West Yorkshire; 53.7044°N 1.6091°W		1823–1825	A Commissioners' church, altered in 1894, damaged by fire in 1916, and restored the following year.	II
St Mary's Church	Quarry Hill, Leeds, West Yorkshire	—	1823–1825	A Commissioners' church with a tower. Demolished in the late 1970s.	—
St John's Church	Dewsbury, West Yorkshire; 53.6920°N 1.6508°W		1823–1827	A Commissioners' church with a west tower, crenellated parapets and lancet windows.	II
School	Attercliffe, Sheffield, South Yorkshire; 53.3955°N 1.4304°W	—	1824	Built as a girls' national school; later a clubroom.	II
St Peter's Church	Birstall, West Yorkshire; 53.7316°N 1.6702°W	—	1824	Alterations to a medieval church, which was demolished and replaced in 1863–70.	II*
St John's Church	Roundhay, Leeds, West Yorkshire; 53.8305°N 1.4895°W		1824–1826	A small church with a west tower surmounted by a broach spire with lucarnes. The churchyard walls, gates and gatepiers are listed separately, also at Grade II.	II
St Peter's Church	Earlsheaton, Dewsbury, West Yorkshire	—	1825–1827	A Commissioners' church with transepts, tower and spire. Demolished in 1971.	—
Holy Trinity Church	Ripon, North Yorkshire; 54.1380°N 1.5285°W		1826–27	A new church, with a cruciform plan and a tall steeple. Alterations were made later in the 19th century.	II
School and almshouses	Roundhay, Leeds, West Yorkshire; 53.8297°N 1.4891°W		Undated	For Stephen Nicholson of Roundhay Park.	II

== See also ==
- List of Commissioners' churches in Yorkshire
