= St Bartholomew's Church, Colne =

Coordinates: 53.8572°N 2.1703°W

St Bartholomew's, Colne
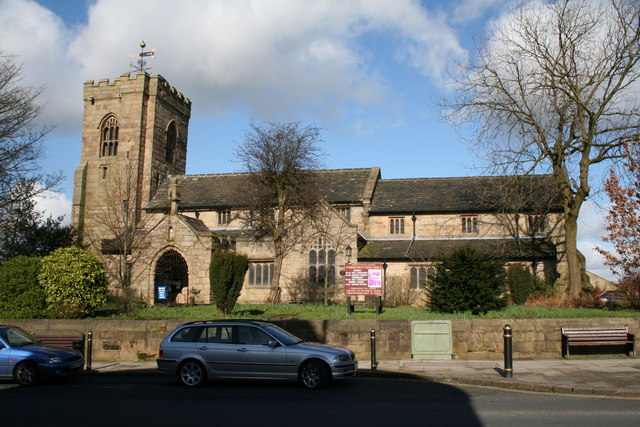

- Location in the Borough of Pendle
- OS grid reference: SD 88897 40125
- Location: Church Street, Colne, Lancashire
- Country: England
- Denomination: Anglican
- Website: achurchnearyou.com/church/11522/

Architecture
- Functional status: Active
- Heritage designation: Grade I
- Designated: 29 January 1988

Specifications
- Height: 62 feet (19 m)

Administration
- Province: York
- Diocese: Blackburn
- Archdeaconry: Blackburn
- Deanery: Pendle

St Bartholomew's Church is in the town of Colne in Lancashire, England. It is an active Anglican parish church in the Diocese of Blackburn. There has been a church on the site since no later than the 12th century although the present building mostly dates from the 16th century. It is recorded in the National Heritage List for England as a designated Grade I listed building.

== History ==
A church has existed on the site from no later than the 12th century and was possibly founded by Robert de Lacy. The present building mostly dates from the early 16th century although there are traces from the late 12th or early 13th century in the north arcade of the nave. The building probably underwent significant restoration in the 16th century. A font was donated to the church by Lawrence Towneley in 1590. In 1815, repairs were made to the north arcade by Thomas Taylor. The building underwent restoration by E. G. Paley in 1856–57, and a further restoration in 1889–91 by Paley, Austin and Paley. In the latter restoration the north aisle was removed and replaced by a double aisle, an organ chamber and vestries were added, the church was reseated, and screens, choir stalls, a pulpit and an altar were added; this restoration cost nearly £7,000 (equivalent to £770,000 in 2025). In 1988 the church was designated a Grade I listed building. The Grade I listing is for buildings "of exceptional interest, sometimes considered to be internationally important".

== Architecture ==
=== Exterior ===
The church is constructed of wrought stone in the Perpendicular and Late Perpendicular styles. Its plan consists of a nave with a south and a double north aisle, a chancel, chapels to the north and south of the chancel, vestries, an organ chamber and a tower to the west. There is a porch to the south. The south windows are straight-headed with four arched lights; the clerestory has three-light windows. The five-light east window has cinquefoil heads and rectilinear tracery. The north aisle has two- and three-light windows.

The tower is 62 feet (19 m) high. It has square buttresses of four stages at the western corners. The three-light belfry windows are pointed and transomed, with tracery in their heads. The tower parapet is crenellated with gargoyles below, to the north and south. The doorway to the tower has a pointed head.

The porch to the south has a niche in its gable, and a sundial in place of a finial. Its entrance has a pointed arch and chamfered orders. Inside there is a stone bench on either side of the entrance.

=== Interior and fittings ===
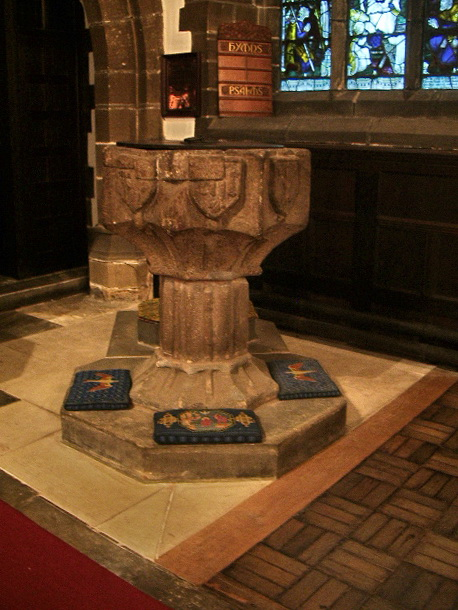
The 16th century baptismal font

The nave measures 55 feet (17 m) by 19 feet (5.8 m). The north and south arcades have four bays; the north has round piers with moulded bases and capitals and the south has octagonal columns, also with moulded bases and capitals. There is an inner and an outer aisle to the north, separated from each other by an arcade of four pointed arches and octagonal piers. The font is octagonal with concave sides, each featuring a shield. The shields contain symbols of the Passion and the initials of Lawrence Towneley. The pulpit is constructed of oak on a stone base.

The chancel measures 42 feet 9 inches (13.03 m) by 20 feet 9 inches (6.32 m). It has a narrow opening into the north aisle. Its arcades to the north and south have octagonal piers and three pointed arches of two chamfered orders. The Banastre chapel to the north, and the Barnside chapel to the south, are both separated from the aisles by oak screens.

The tower has a ring of eight bells. Six of them date from 1814, cast by Thomas Mears of London. The remaining two were given to the church in 1900 by Thomas Hyde of Colne.

== Churchyard ==
The churchyard lies mostly to the south of the church. The oldest dated gravestone is from 1606. There is a medieval stone cross to the south-east of the building. It consists of a square block topped with an octagonal shaft and an octagonal block. The cross has a Grade II listing.

== See also ==
- Grade I listed buildings in Lancashire
- Grade I listed churches in Lancashire
- Listed buildings in Colne
- List of works by Thomas Taylor
- List of ecclesiastical works by E. G. Paley
- List of works by Paley, Austin and Paley
