= Listed buildings in Colne =

Colne is a civil parish in Pendle, Lancashire, England. It contains 45 listed buildings that are recorded in the National Heritage List for England. Of these, one is listed at Grade I, the highest of the three grades, two are at Grade II*, the middle grade, and the others are at Grade II, the lowest grade.

The parish contains the town of Colne and surrounding countryside. Before the arrival of the cotton industry, it was mainly agricultural, and most of the earlier listed buildings are farmhouses, farm buildings, and other houses, Industry is represented by the surviving Primet Foundry. The Leeds and Liverpool Canal runs through the western part of the parish, and the listed buildings associated with it are locks, a bridge, the entrance to a tunnel, and a lock cottage. The other listed buildings include two crosses, a church, a public house, former schools, a toll house, shops, the town hall, almshouses, memorials, and telephone kiosks.

== Key ==
Grade	Criteria
I	Buildings of exceptional interest, sometimes considered to be internationally important
II*	Particularly important buildings of more than special interest
II	Buildings of national importance and special interest

== Buildings ==
Name and location	Photograph	Date	Notes	Grade
Cross; 53.85714°N 2.16998°W	—	Medieval	The stone cross is in the churchyard of St Bartholomew's Church. It has a large square base, and a shaft rising to become octagonal. On the top is a larger octagonal block with some apparent carving.	II
Market cross 53.85717°N 2.16704°W		15th century	The relocated market cross was restored in 1906. It is in stone and is 15 feet (4.6 m) high. The cross stands on a two-stage pedestal on three steps. Its column consists of nine blocks on a moulded base, and it has a brattished cap.	II
Greenfield Farmhouse; 53.85313°N 2.18935°W	—	16th century	This was originally the cross wing of a larger house, and is in stone with some rendering. There are three storeys. In the two lower storeys are seven-light mullioned windows with semicircular heads. Above them are moulded dripstones. In the gabled top storey is a four-light square-headed window.	II
St Bartholomew's Church; 53.85723°N 2.17024°W		16th century	The church was restoration by E. G. Paley in 1856–57, and additions were made to it in 1889–91 by Paley, Austin and Paley. It is a stone church in Perpendicular style, and consists of a nave and chancel with a clerestory, a south aisle, a double north aisle, and a west tower. The tower has angle buttresses, a west doorway, a southeast stair turret, and an embattled parapet.	I
Langroyd Hall; 53.86631°N 2.16922°W	—	1604	A house, later converted into a public house, in stone with a slate roof. It has two storeys, and consists of a main block and a cross wing. On the front is a jettied two-storey porch. The doorway has a moulded surround and a four-centred arched head, and above it is a coat of arms. Most of the windows are sashes, and others are mullioned.	II
Back O' Th' Edge; 53.86810°N 2.17617°W	—	Mid 17th century	A stone house with a stone-slate roof and a central chimney. The windows are mullioned, and above them are moulded and returned drip stones.	II
Great House Farmhouse and Cottage; 53.86657°N 2.17413°W	—	17th century	A house and two cottages in stone with a stone-slate roof. The building is in a T-shaped plan, and has two storeys. The windows are mullioned. There is a doorway with a chamfered four-centred arch that has been converted into a window.	II
Wayside Barn; 53.85293°N 2.18911°W	—	17th century (probable)	The barn has been partly converted into a house. It is in stone with a stone-slate roof and quoins. At the rear is a projection. There are two doorways, one of which has been converted into a window, with massive chamfered lintels.	II
Stanroyd; 53.86078°N 2.14791°W	—	Late 17th century	A stone house with a stone-slate roof, it has an L-shaped plan and two storeys. The windows are mullioned, some with semicircular heads, and others with square heads. The doorway has a chamfered surround and an arched head. Above the openings are moulded drip stones.	II
1–3 Carry Lane; 53.85498°N 2.16124°W	—	1702	Originally one house known as Carry Bridge Hall, it was later divided into three dwellings. The building is in stone with a stone-slate roof in two storeys and six bays. On the front is a jettied porch; the doorway has moulded jambs and lintel, the lintel being inscribed with initials and the date. One of the windows has a stepped head, and above it is a dovecote.	II
Garden Entrance to Hobstones Farmhouse; 53.87124°N 2.18069°W	—	1704	The entrance consists of a shallow stone arch with a pedestrian entrance to the side. The arch is surmounted by a stepped pediment with large ball finials. The pediment contains short columns, between which is blind arcading.	II*
Langroyd Farmhouse and outbuildings 53.86605°N 2.16799°W	—	Early 18th century	The house, the barn, and other outbuildings attached to the rear, are in stone with a stone-slate roof. The house has two storeys and an attic, with its symmetrical gabled entrance front facing the road. The windows are mullioned, the attic window having a moulded semicircular head. The central doorway has a plain surround and a triangular hood.	II
Hobstones Farmhouse and Cottages; 53.87122°N 2.18107°W	—	Early 18th century	A house and two cottages in stone with a stone-slate roof in two storeys. On the front is a two-storey jettied porch that has a doorway with a moulded surround, a massive lintel and an incised datestone. Some of the windows are mullioned, some are stepped, and there are two Venetian windows. Inside the house is an inglenook.	II*
Lidgett; 53.85987°N 2.15037°W	—	1749	The house is in stone with a stone-slate roof, and has three storeys. Most of the windows have retained their mullions. On the front is a porch and a square-headed doorway.	II
Blakey Hall; 53.86326°N 2.19600°W	—	18th century	The house incorporates earlier material. It is in stone with a stone-slate roof, and has two storeys and an attic. Above the doorway is a cornice hood, and the ground floor windows are sashes. In the upper floor are two four-light windows with semicircular heads, and a two-light plain window.	II
Heyroyd; 53.86418°N 2.14405°W	—	c. 1777	A stone house with a Welsh slate roof in two storeys with a symmetrical front of five bays. Over the middle three bays is a pediment containing a Diocletian window. The doorway has Doric pilasters, a pediment, and a fanlight. The windows are sashes.	II
Coal Pit Lane Farmhouse and barn 53.85348°N 2.15521°W	—	Late 18th century	The house and barn are in stone with a stone-slate roof. The house has two storeys, mullioned windows, a doorway with a plain surround, and a glazed porch. The barn is to the left and projects forward.	II
Edge End Farmhouse; 53.86673°N 2.18868°W	—	Late 18th century	The house is in stone with a stone-slate roof, in two storeys and three bays. The windows are mullioned and contain sashes. On the front is a gabled porch, above which is a niche.	II
Gate piers and walls, Heyroyd; 53.86399°N 2.14379°W	—	Late 18th century	The stone gate piers are square and have cornices and ball finials. There are two pairs of piers; on each side the outer pier is joined to the inner pier by a dwarf quadrant wall.	II
Red Lion; 53.85733°N 2.16720°W		1791	A public house in stone with a slate roof. It has two storeys, the top storey having been added in the 19th century. The windows are mullioned, those in the top floor containing sashes. The doorway has rusticated jambs, and it has an elaborate head. Above it is a pedestal carrying a carved reclining lion.	II
Blakey Bridge (No 144); 53.86441°N 2.19704°W		1794	The bridge carries Red Lane over the Leeds and Liverpool Canal. It is in stone and consists of a single elliptical arch with rusticated voussoirs. The bridge has a coped parapet, and curved abutments ending in piers.	II
Bridge over Foulridge Ings Beck; 53.87114°N 2.19136°W		1794	The bridge was built to provide road access over a stream, to the Foulridge Tunnel that carries the Leeds and Liverpool Canal. It is in stone and consists of a single segmental arch with a coped parapet. Its abutments end in piers.	II
Lock No 45; 53.85898°N 2.20098°W		1794	The lock on the Leeds and Liverpool Canal is in stone with wooden gates. The retaining walls curve out at the upper end in quadrants.	II
Lock No 46; 53.85813°N 2.20205°W		1794	The lock on the Leeds and Liverpool Canal is in stone with wooden gates. The retaining walls curve out at the upper end in quadrants.	II
Lock No 47; 53.85738°N 2.20282°W		1794	The lock on the Leeds and Liverpool Canal is in stone with wooden gates. The retaining walls curve out at the upper end in quadrants.	II
Southern entrance, Foulridge Tunnel; 53.87083°N 2.19158°W		1796	The tunnel carries the Leeds and Liverpool Canal. The entrance is in stone and consists of a curving wall with a semicircular arch flanked by piers. There are stone steps on both sides.	II
Sunday School; 53.85717°N 2.16982°W		1812	The first grammar school in the town, it is in stone with a slate roof. There are two storeys and five bays, with a pediment over the central bay containing an oval inscribed plaque. The windows in the ground floor have plain surrounds; those in the upper storey have semicircular heads with keystones and imposts.	II
Woolpack; 53.84970°N 2.16847°W	—	1823	A row of five cottages in stone with a stone-slate roof. They have two storeys at the front and three at the rear. The windows were originally sashes, and these have been replaced by casement windows.	II
Colne Waterside Bridge; 53.85270°N 2.16844°W		Early 19th century	The bridge carries Mill Green over Colne Water. It is in stone, and consists of a single segmental arch with voussoirs and a parapet. It has a roadway of setts, and a flagged pathway on one side.	II
Barrowford Locks Top Lock Cottage; 53.85898°N 2.20071°W		Early 19th century (possible)	The house stands adjacent to lock No. 45 on the Leeds and Liverpool Canal. It is in stone with a stone-slate roof, in two storeys and two bays. The windows are sashes.	II
Toll House, Cottage and Stable; 53.85958°N 2.15050°W	—	Early 19th century (probable)	The former toll house, cottage and stable are in gritstone with a hipped slate roof. The building has two storeys and five bays, comprising a house incorporating a cart entrance, a stable to the right, and a canted toll house to the left. Most of the windows are sashes, with a round window above the cart entrance, and round-headed windows in the canted bay of the toll house.	II
Wanless Water Farmhouse; 53.86704°N 2.19544°W	—	Early 19th century	A stone house with a slate roof in two storeys. The windows are square-headed with mullions, and the central doorway has a plain surround. There is a lean-to extension to the left.	II
St Bartholomew's Church School; 53.85590°N 2.17137°W	—	1844	The school, which is no longer in use, is in sandstone with a slate roof. It has a cruciform plan, and two storeys. Its features include mullioned windows, gables with finials, and a bellcote with a saddleback roof.	II
Alkincoats Lodge; 53.85969°N 2.18310°W	—	c. 1850	The former lodge is in sandstone with a stone-slate roof in Tudor revival style. It has two storeys and two bays, and is in an L-shaped plan. Features include stepped mullioned windows, a doorway with a shallow arched head and a hood mould, and gables with ball finials.	II
Primet Foundry; 53.85296°N 2.18397°W		c. 1850	A former loom factory, foundry and cotton mill, that continued to be extended until 1947, and has since been converted for other uses. It is in sandstone with roofs of Welsh slate, stone-slate, and sheeting. Its components include an engine house, a boiler house, two chimneys (one octagonal, the other circular and truncated), weaving sheds, a foundry, offices, and a smithy.	II
Princess House; 53.85624°N 2.17477°W	—	1867	Originally a house known as Colne Hall, it is in stone with a slate roof, and in Gothic Revival style. The gabled wing to the left has a single-storey bay window with a dentilled parapet. Above this is a three-light sash window with an arched head containing an octofoil. The block to the right has gablets and sash windows. In the angle is a porch with granite pillars and a trilobe head, and a parapet. Between all the windows are granite pillars in front of mullions. On the south side is an oriel window.	II
Shackleton Hall; 53.85686°N 2.17064°W	—	Late 19th century	A row of shops and offices in stone with a slate roof in three storeys. In the ground floor are modern shop fronts, and the upper part is divided into two blocks. The left block has eight bays, with windows forming a continuous arcade in the middle storey, and casement windows in the top floor. The right block has five bays, the middle bay projecting forward under a segmental pediment. The windows in this block are sashes.	II
Town Hall; 53.85665°N 2.17125°W		1893	The town hall is in stone, and has two storeys and a symmetrical five-bay front. In the central bay is an arched entrance flanked by three granite colonettes. The bay rises to a five-stage tower with an oriel window, lancet windows above, clock faces in the fourth stage, and triple bell openings in the top stage. On the summit is a pyramidal roof. Above the other bays is a quatrefoil parapet.	II
Norway House; 53.85600°N 2.17462°W		1906	A shop, originally a Cooperative Store, in stone and reinforced concrete with a slate roof. There are three storeys and eight bays. In the ground floor are shop fronts, and art nouveau corbels. Three of the bays are gabled, two of these containing Venetian windows in the top floor, and the bays between have shaped parapets. The fourth bay has an arched entrance. On the left corner is an oriel window above which is a dome on a colonnade.	II
Hartley Homes; 53.86272°N 2.13265°W	—	1911	A group of 20 almshouses on a sloping site donated by William Pickles Hartley. They are in stone with Westmorland slate] roofs, and are arranged round three sides of a rectangle. Each house is in a single storey, and has a castellated bay window. In the centre of the northern range is a two-stage castellated clock tower.	II
Lychgate, wall and steps, Hartley Homes; 53.86225°N 2.13265°W	—	1911	These are buildings associated with almshouses donated by William Pickles Hartley. The entrance is through a lychgate, which is in stone with a slate roof. It contains iron gates, and is flanked by a boundary wall with iron railings. Beyond it are stepped paths into the garden, and in the centre of the garden is an ornate pedestal for a sundial, with carvings on the faces.	II
Gravestone of Wallace Hartley; 53.85648°N 2.15761°W	—	1912	Wallace Hartley was the bandleader on the RMS Titanic who died on its maiden voyage. The gravestone is in white granite, about 3 metres (9.8 ft) high, and includes a carving of a violin and a bow, and a music book open at the hymn Nearer, my God, to Thee.	II
Wallace Hartley Memorial; 53.85570°N 2.17651°W		1915	Wallace Hartley was the bandleader on the RMS Titanic who died on its maiden voyage. The memorial is by the Bromsgrove Guild. It consists of a pedestal in Portland stone, tapering towards the top and carrying a bronze bust of the head and shoulders of Hartley. Seated beside the bust are bronze seated allegorical figures representing Music and Valour. On the front face of the pedestal is an inscription.	II
War memorial 53.85575°N 2.17625°W		1930	The war memorial is in the form of a propylaeum in Portland stone on a sandstone base. It has three bays with square columns and pilasters supporting an entablature with an inscribed frieze. Inside the structure is a floor of black and grey marble. The names of those lost in the First World War are inscribed on marble panels on the end walls. In the centre is a Stone of Remembrance containing bronze plaques with the names of the casualties in the Second World War.	II
Two telephone kiosks 53.85592°N 2.17418°W	—	1935	A pair of K6 type telephone kiosks, designed by Giles Gilbert Scott. Constructed in cast iron with a square plan and a dome, They have three unperforated crowns in the top panels.	II
