= Thomas Taylor (architect) =

English artist and architect

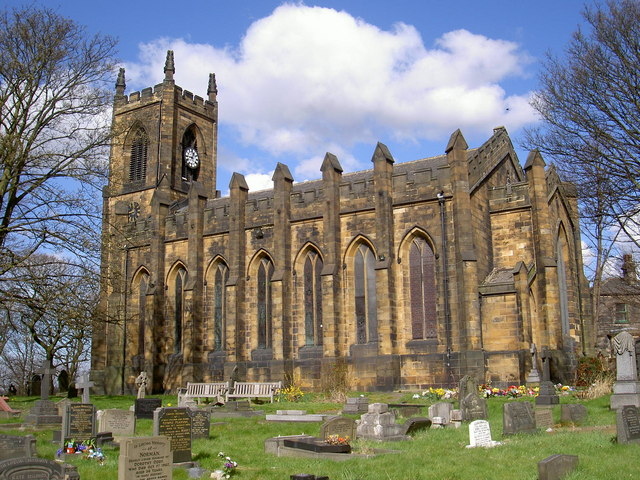
St John's Church, Dewsbury, a Commissioners' church designed by Thomas Taylor

Thomas Taylor (born 1777 or 1778, died 1826) was an English artist and architect. Although he did not achieve the reputation or the output of Thomas Rickman, he was another pioneer in the use of the Gothic Revival style in church architecture.

== Career ==
Nothing is known of Taylor's early life. During the 1790s he was working in the London office of the architect James Wyatt. At the same time, he enrolled in the Royal Academy Schools to study architecture on 15 July 1791, giving his age as 22. Between 1792 and 1811 he exhibited 58 pictures at the Royal Academy. Some of these pictures were landscapes, but most were of medieval buildings. By 1810 he had moved to Leeds, West Yorkshire, where he established an architectural practice, and continued to work as an artist. He died in Leeds in 1826 when he was aged in his late 40s.

== Works ==
His first known architectural work was the rebuilding of the south side of Leeds Parish church (1808–12) in Gothic Revival style, including a large window in the south transept. This was followed by Leeds Court House (1811–13) in Neoclassical style. Taylor's first commission for a new church came from Revd Hammond Robertson (1757–1841), an enthusiast for the use of the Gothic style in church architecture. This was Christ Church, Liversedge, West Yorkshire. Robertson bought the site, paid for the act of Parliament, the Liversedge Chapel of Ease Act 1812 (52 Geo. 3. c. xi) and also paid for the church itself. The foundation stone was laid in 1812, and the church was consecrated in 1816. It was a large church, with aisles, a clerestory, a west tower, and a chancel larger than was normal at the time. Christ Church was the first new church in Gothic style to be built in the local region. More churches followed locally, including Holy Trinity Huddersfield, constructed 1816-19. By 1815–16 he was also working in Lancashire, repairing churches in Colne and Rochdale, and rebuilding Holy Trinity Church, Littleborough (1816–20).

The Church Building Act 1818 provided grants for the building of new churches, especially in areas where their building had not kept up with the growth of the population. The grants were administered by the Church Building Commission, and these churches are generally known as Commissioners' churches. Taylor, because of his recent building experience and his geographical location, was ideally placed to receive commissions for these churches. In all he was commissioned to build seven of these churches, all in Yorkshire, the first being St Lawrence, Pudsey (1819–24). During the time he was designing these churches, he was also designing other new churches, and carrying out repairs and alterations to existing churches.

== See also ==
- List of works by Thomas Taylor

== Sources ==
- Hartwell, Clare; Hyde, Matthew; Pevsner, Nikolaus (2004), Lancashire: Manchester and the South-East, The Buildings of England, New Haven and London: Yale University Press, ISBN 0-300-10583-5
- Port, M. H. (2006), 600 New Churches: The Church Building Commission 1818-1856 (2nd ed.), Reading: Spire Books, ISBN 978-1-904965-08-4
- Pevsner, Nikolaus; Radcliffe, Enid (2003), Yorkshire: The West Riding, The Buildings of England (2 ed.), New Haven and London: Yale University Press, ISBN 0-300-09662-3
- Webster, Christopher (2012), "'Foremost among those who successfully promoted the ancient style of architecture': the churches of Thomas Taylor (1777/8–1826)", in Webster, Christopher (ed.), Episodes in the Gothic Revival: six church architects, Spire Studies in Architectural History, vol. 1, Reading: Spire Books, ISBN 978-1-904965-34-3
