= Colne Primet Academy =

Location
- Dent Street; Colne; Lancashire, BB8 8JF; England
- Coordinates: 53.84922°N 2.18805°W

Information
- Type: Academy
- Local authority: Lancashire
- Authority: Pendle Education Trust
- Department for Education URN: 139130 Tables
- Ofsted: Reports
- Headteacher: Julia Pilkington
- Gender: Mixed
- Age: 11 to 16
- Enrolment: 746 as of October 2022
- Website: http://www.colneprimet.co.uk/

Colne Primet Academy (formerly Colne Primet High School) is a mixed secondary school located in Colne in the English county of Lancashire.

Previously a community school, administered by Lancashire County Council, Colne Primet High School converted to academy status on 1 January 2013, and was renamed Colne Primet Academy. The school is now sponsored by the Pendle Education Trust, but continues to coordinate with Lancashire County Council for admissions.

Colne Primet Academy offers GCSEs, BTECs and ASDAN courses as programmes of study for pupils.

== Notable former staff ==
- Alan Wharton, cricketer
