= Pendle Hippodrome Theatre =

- Location in the Borough of Pendle
- Location: Colne, Lancashire, England
- Coordinates: 53.8581°N 2.1721°W
- Owner: Pendle Hippodrome Theatre Company
- Operator: Pendle Hippodrome Theatre Limited
- Capacity: 489
- Type: Theatre

Construction
- Built: 1914
- Opened: 21 September 1914
- Renovated: 1978–1986
- Architect: RS Pilling
- Main contractor: George Fort

Website
- www.phtheatre.co.uk

The Pendle Hippodrome Theatre is an volunteer-run theatre in Colne, Lancashire in the north of England. It is owned by the Pendle Hippodrome Theatre Company, operating as Pendle Hippodrome Theatre Limited.

The building originally opened in 1914 as a cinema and variety theatre.

The Pendle Hippodrome Theatre was bought in 1978 by three local operatic societies and restored over the following eight years. Owned by The Pendle Hippodrome Theatre Company who perform at the theatre, it is run by volunteers, independently, without outside funding. The Theatre is a registered charity and provides a venue for local performers, schools, musical, drama and dance groups as well as being home to the Theatre Company and the Pendle Hippodrome Youth Theatre.

In December 2014 the Pendle Hippodrome Theatre completed the purchase of the neighbouring public house with the intention of expanding its facilities in the near future.

In June 2015 the Pendle Hippodrome Theatre was awarded with The Queen's Award For Voluntary Service.
