= Frederick Cayley Robinson =

English artist (1862–1927)

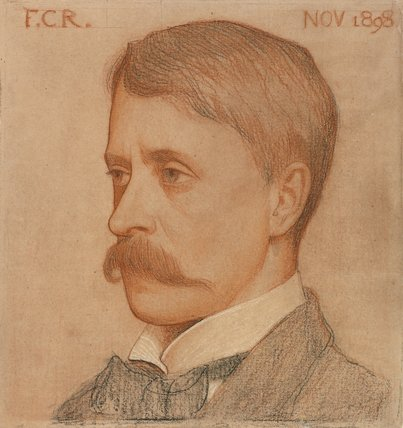
Frederick Cayley Robinson: self-portrait dated 1898, National Portrait Gallery, London

Frederick Cayley Robinson ARA (18 August 1862 – 4 January 1927) was an English artist who created paintings and applied art, including book illustrations and theatre set designs. Cayley Robinson continued to paint striking Pre-Raphaelite and Victorian subjects well into the twentieth century despite this approach becoming deeply unfashionable.

His series of large-scale mural paintings for the Middlesex Hospital entitled Acts of Mercy commissioned around 1915 and completed in 1920 are some of his most impressive works, along with Pastoral (1923; Tate Britain, London), which was bought by the Chantrey Bequest for the nation. However his many smaller paintings, particularly of interiors featuring sombre women as well as the theme of departure, are significant works of modern British art.

== Biography ==
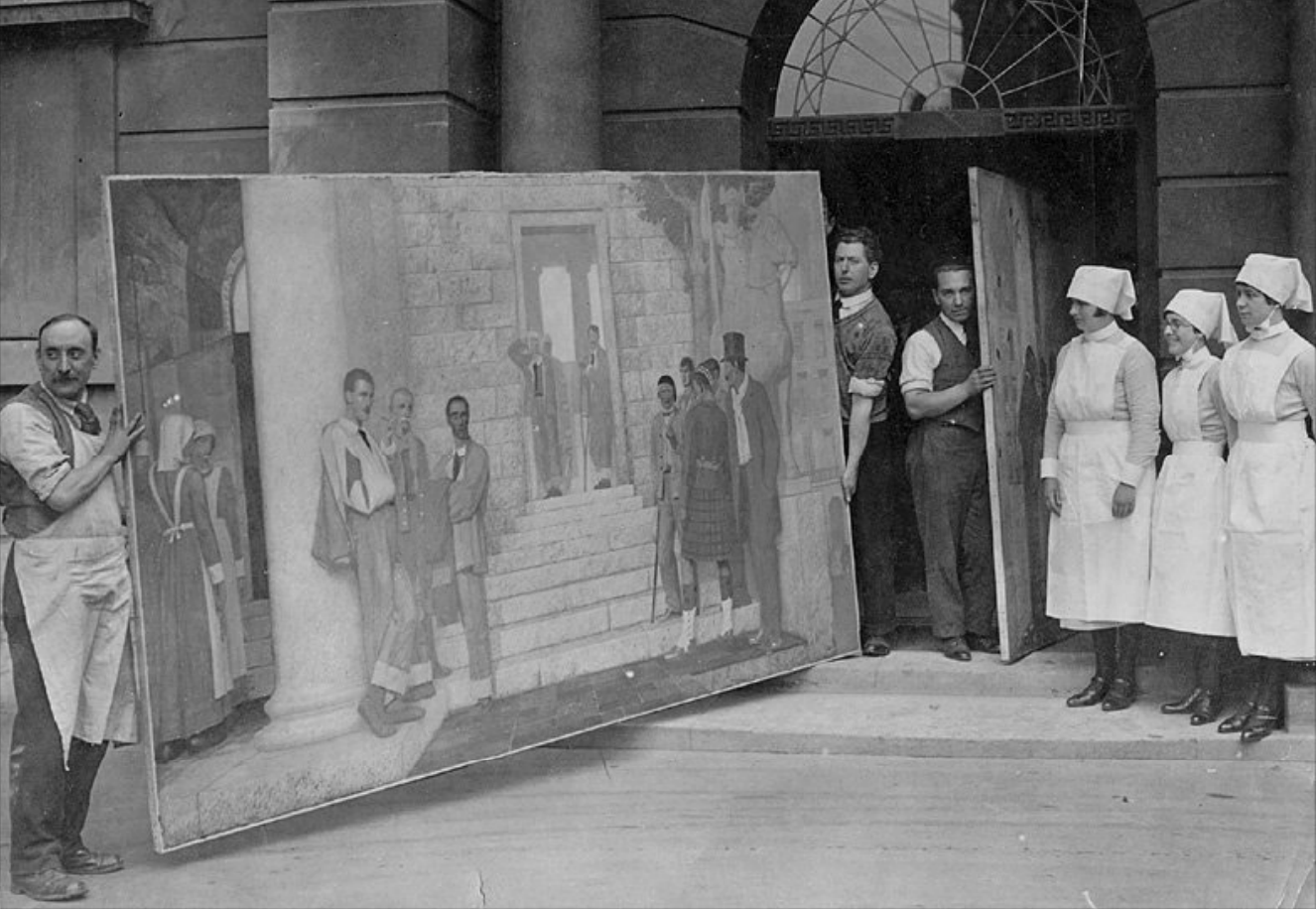
The painting Wounded and sick men gathered outside a hospital, from the Acts of Mercy series, arrives at the Middlesex Hospital in 1920

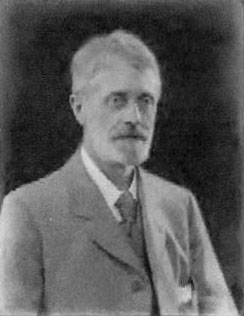
Undated photograph of Cayley Robinson

Born on 18 August 1862, in Brentford-on-Thames, Middlesex, Frederick Cayley Robinson was the son of Frederic Robinson, an engineer. He was educated at the East Cliff House school run by Dr. Frederick George Head, in Cliftonville, and in France at the Lycée de Pau. He studied at the St. John's Wood Art School, London, and from 1885 to 1888 at the Royal Academy Schools. He was elected a member of the Royal Society of British Artists in 1889. Early on, Cayley Robinson painted scenes of the sea in the fashionable Newlyn style, and from 1889 to 1891 he sailed in a boat around Britain.

When he returned, Cayley Robinson studied at the Académie Julian in Paris from 1891 to 1894. The artist's time studying at the académie had a critical influence on his entire artistic output, which displays the influence of European Symbolism, especially the avant-garde group the Nabis and the revival of interest in Edward Burne-Jones in Paris at this time. Like many of his peers, Cayley Robinson felt drawn to a new style of art, moving away from modern impressionism and appearing to emulate the visionary medievalism of the Pre-Raphaelites.

Various connections — for example with the Glasgow School of Art, and within the circle of Charles Ricketts and Charles Shannon — brought Cayley Robinson closer to the occult revival of the period, including the Golden Dawn and esotericism. This context also infused his artworks. From the late 1890s, Cayley Robinson developed his own distinctive oeuvre of artistic expression which combined simple, quiet domesticity – the everyday - with hints of the occult, the mysterious, and the wondrous.

From 1898 to 1901, like many artists of the period, Cayley Robinson visited Florence and during that time studied the Old Masters and techniques such as tempera. In 1904, he became a founder member of the Society of Painters in Tempera. This brought him in contact with a number of other like-minded artists, notably Mary Sargant Florence and Lady Christiana Herringham, both of whom were involved with the suffrage movement.

He was elected a member of the Royal Institute of Oil Painters in 1906. He was elected a member of the NEAC in 1912. In 1919 he was elected a member of the RWS. He was elected ARA (Associate of the Royal Academy of Art) in 1921.

A central theme of Cayley Robinson's paintings was enchantment. He produced very popular illustrations, set designs and costumes for the Haymarket Theatre production in London of Maurice Maeterlinck's The Blue Bird in 1910. In the period 1907–1914, Cayley Robinson was connected with the London-based Art Theosophical Circle, a group which sought forms of artistic enchantment in the modern world. The artist contributed illustrations for their published journal Orpheus.

In 1914, Cayley Robinson moved with his family into 1 Lansdowne House, Lansdowne Road, Kensington, London. This was a custom-built studio apartment block inhabited solely by artists. In the same year, the artist took up his only teaching professorship, at the Glasgow School of Art, which he held for ten years.

Frederick Cayley Robinson died of influenza on 4 January 1927 in a nursing home at 1 Ladbroke Square, Kensington; he was survived by his wife and their daughter Barbara.

== The Outward Bound ==
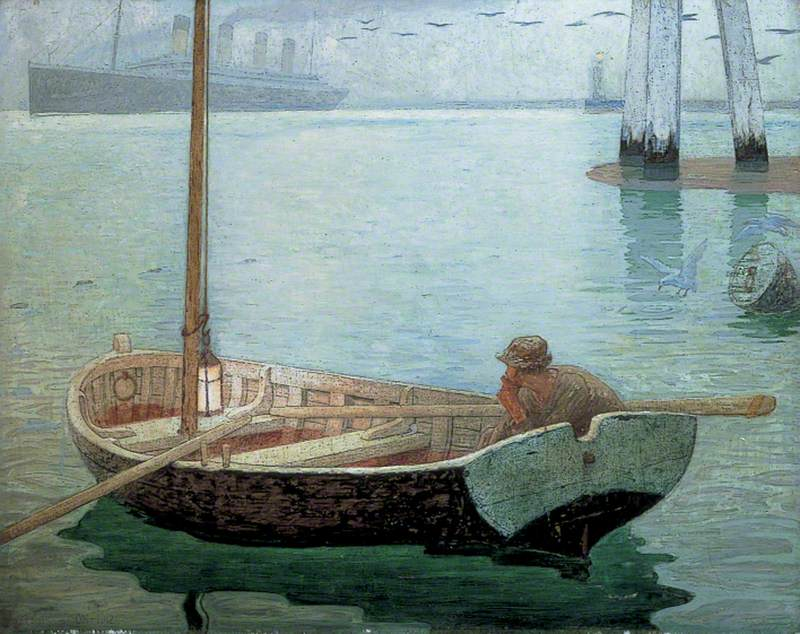
Robinson's 1912 version of The Outward Bound.

Cayley Robinson painted two works named The Outward Bound. His 1903 work shows a young man in a small boat in a harbour watching as a large sailing ship is towed out to sea by a tug. The 1912 work has the same composition, but the departing ship is a four-funnelled liner, identified as the Titanic which sank on its maiden voyage in that year. This version was given to Leeds City Art Gallery by the Leeds Professional Musicians, in memory of Wallace Hartley, the violinist from Dewsbury who led the orchestra on the Titanic and died when it sank. The painting was unveiled in the City Art Gallery by the Lord Mayor of Leeds on 23 December 1912. The 1903 work is in gouache and pencil and measures 30.5 cm × 39 cm (12.0 in × 15.4 in) while the 1912 work is an oil painting of 71.1 cm × 91.4 cm (28.0 in × 36.0 in).

== Exhibitions ==
During his lifetime, Cayley Robinson regularly exhibited at the Royal Academy and the Society of British Painters and held several important solo shows. His first one-man exhibition was held at the Baillie Gallery, London, in 1904.

After his death in 1927, Memorial exhibitions of his work were held in 1928 and 1929. Seventy of his paintings, lent from public and private collections, were exhibited by the Fine Art Society at 148 New Bond St, London, 18 October - 11 November 1977, and at 12 Great King St, Edinburgh, 18 November - 10 December 1977.

Whilst neglected for much of the twentieth century, there has been an increase in the exhibition of Cayley Robinson's work in the twenty-first century:

2006-7: Chasing Happiness at the Fitzwilliam Museum, Cambridge, which displayed his illustrations for Maurice Maeterlinck's The Blue Bird

2010: the National Gallery displayed six works by Cayley Robinson including the four panels of the Acts of Mercy mural series, which had been rescued and purchased by the Wellcome Trust in 2007

2022-23: Many of Cayley Robinson's artworks featured in the exhibition Modern Pre-Raphaelite Visionaries: British Art, 1880-1930 at the Leamington Spa Art Gallery, 13 May - 18 September 2022 and the Watts Gallery, Compton from October 2022- February 2023). A publication entitled Modern Pre-Raphaelite Visionaries: British Art, 1880-1930 was produced to coincide with the exhibition.

== Family ==
Cayley Robinson married in 1898, in Bradford-on-Avon, the painter and illustrator Winifred Lucy Dalley (1861–1936), daughter of the stockbroker John Lambert Dalley. They had one daughter, Barbara (1901–1986), born in Italy, who was a painter of portraits and landscapes. Winifred died in 1936 in their home in Kensington.

== Gallery ==
Works by Frederick Cayley Robinson

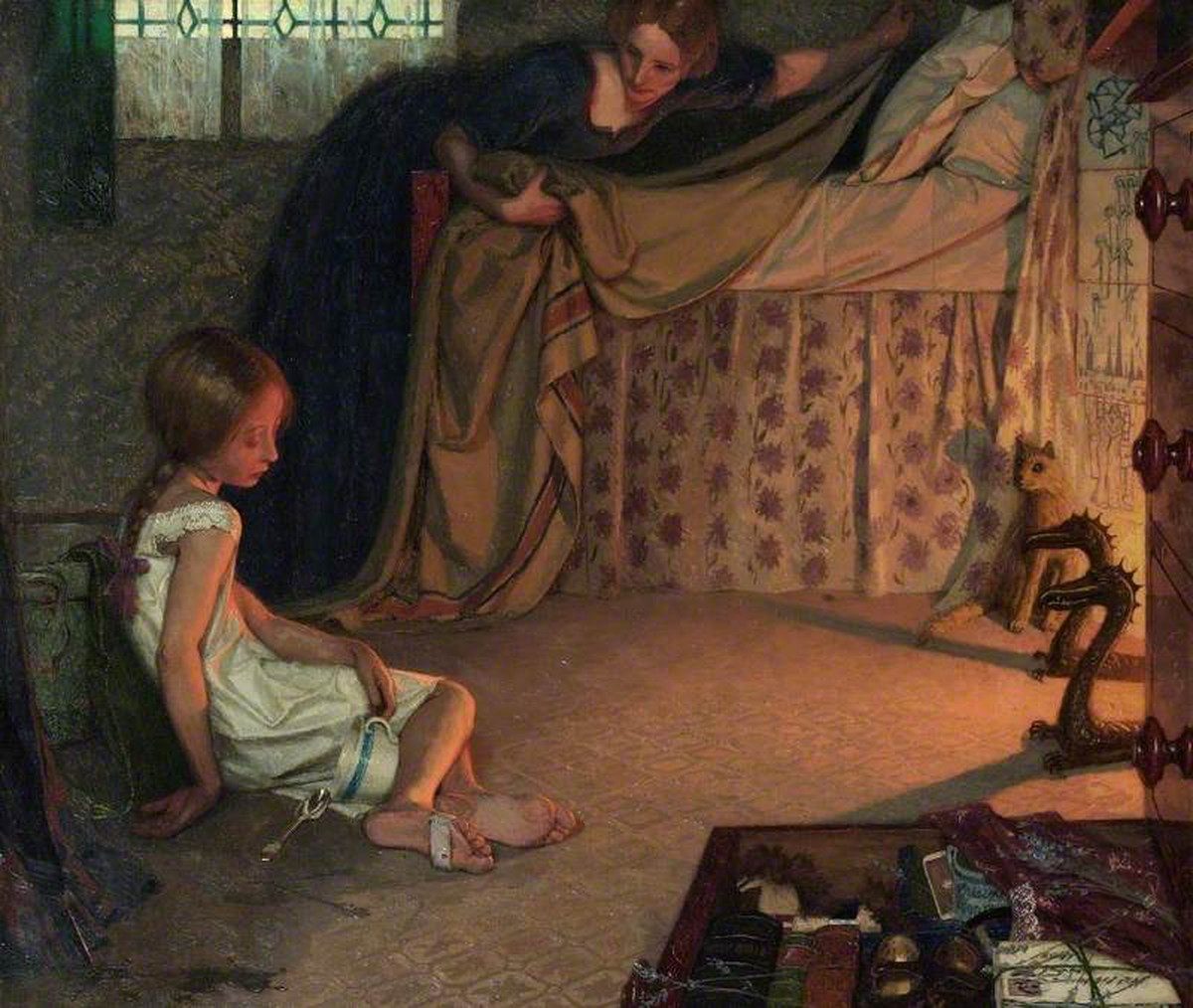
The Foundling, 1896, Leamington Spa Art Gallery

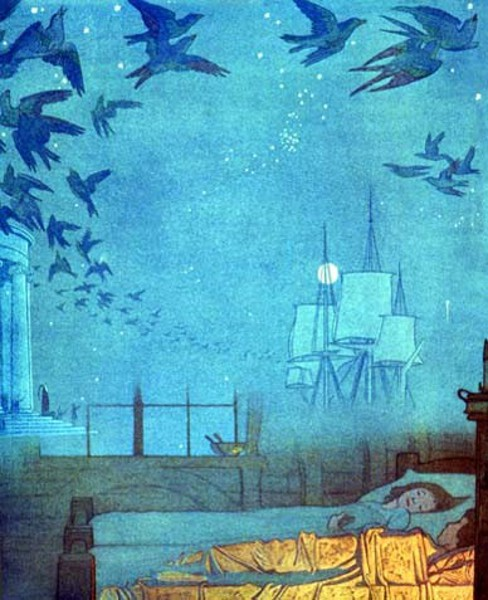
The Blue Bird Dreamships, 1900, Leamington Spa Art Gallery

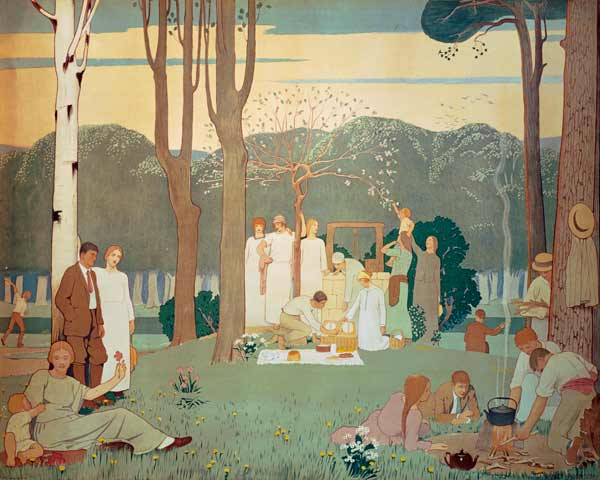
Men, women, and children at a picnic in the park (detail), 1900

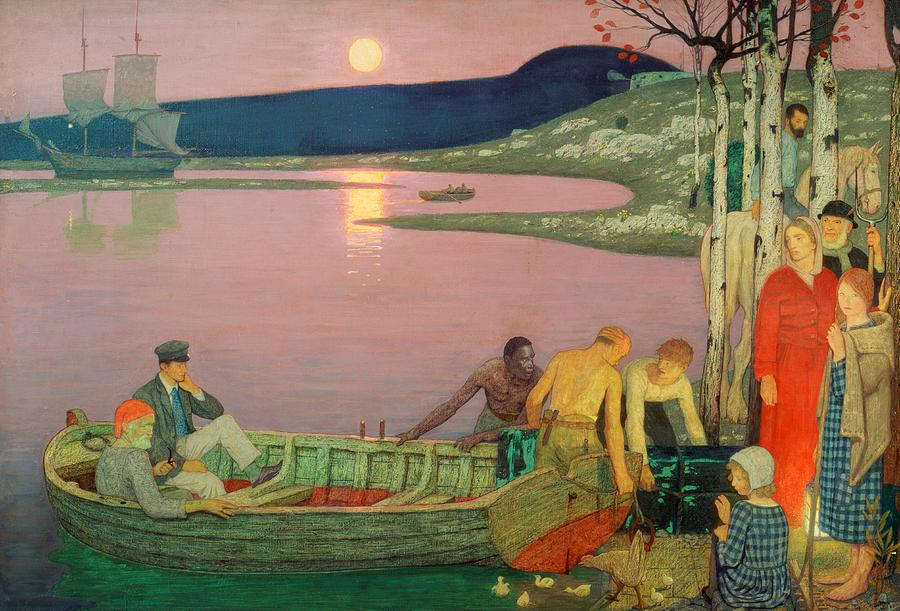
The Call of the Sea, c. 1900

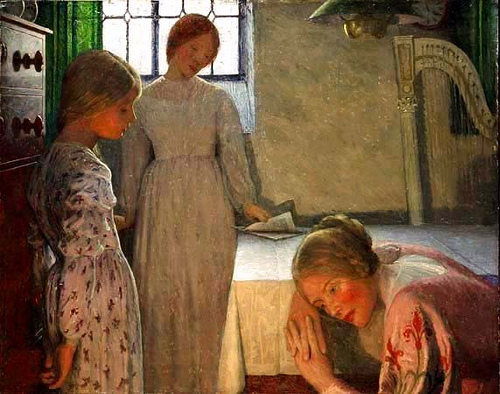
A Winter Evening, c. 1900

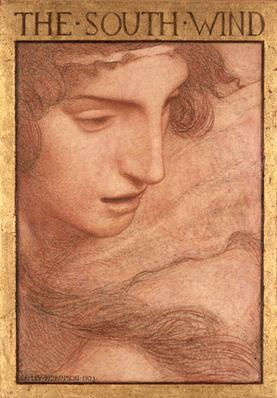
The South Wind, 1903

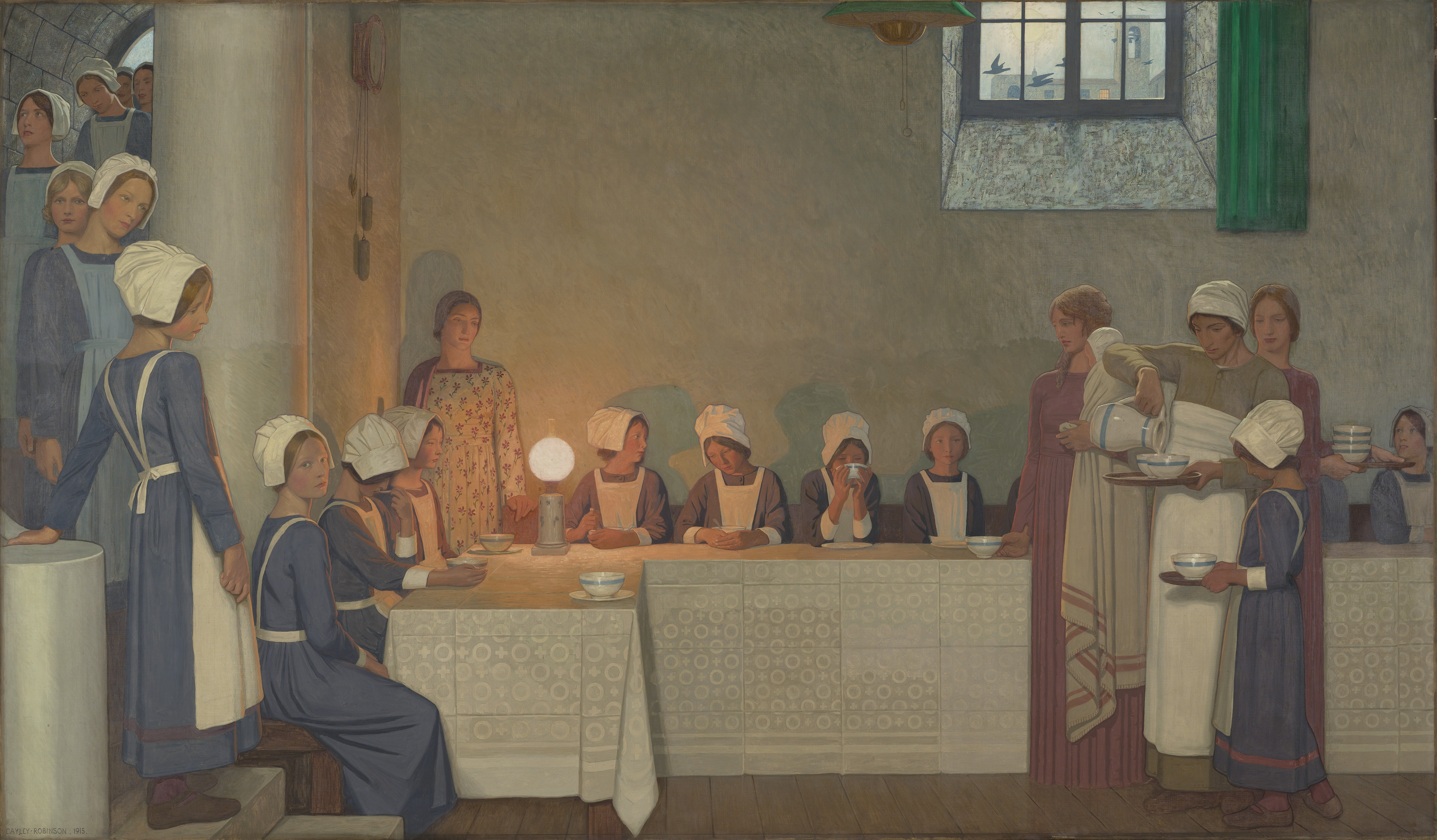
Orphan girls entering the refectory of a hospital, 1915, Wellcome Collection

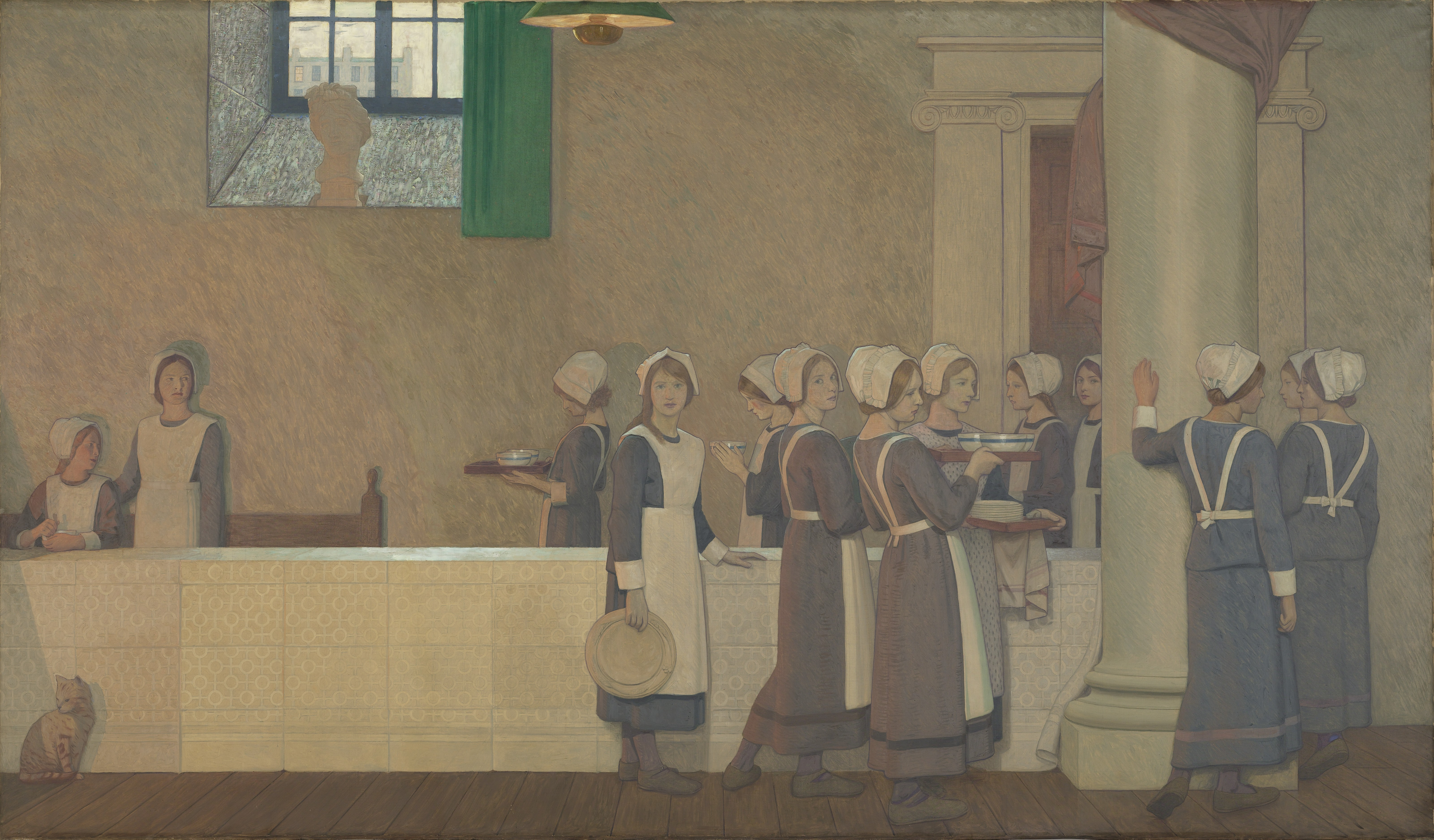
Orphan girls in the refectory of a hospital, proceeding to their place at the table, c. 1915, Wellcome Collection

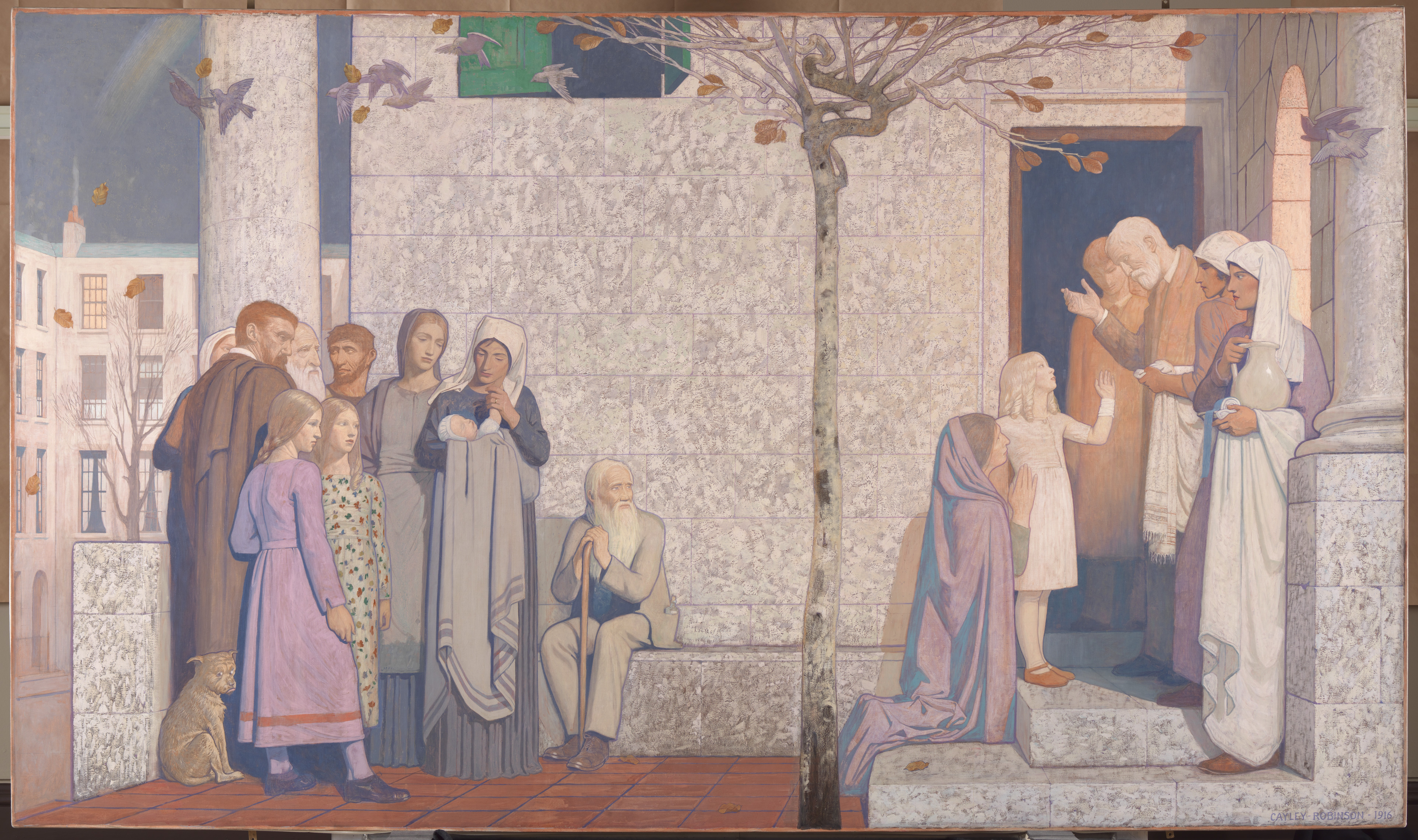
The doctor, 1916, Wellcome Collection

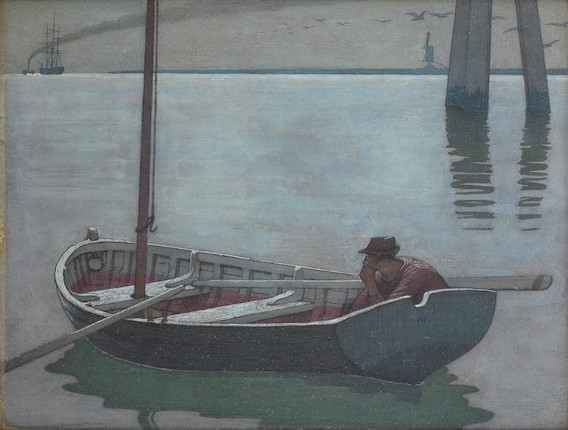
The Outward Bound, 1903

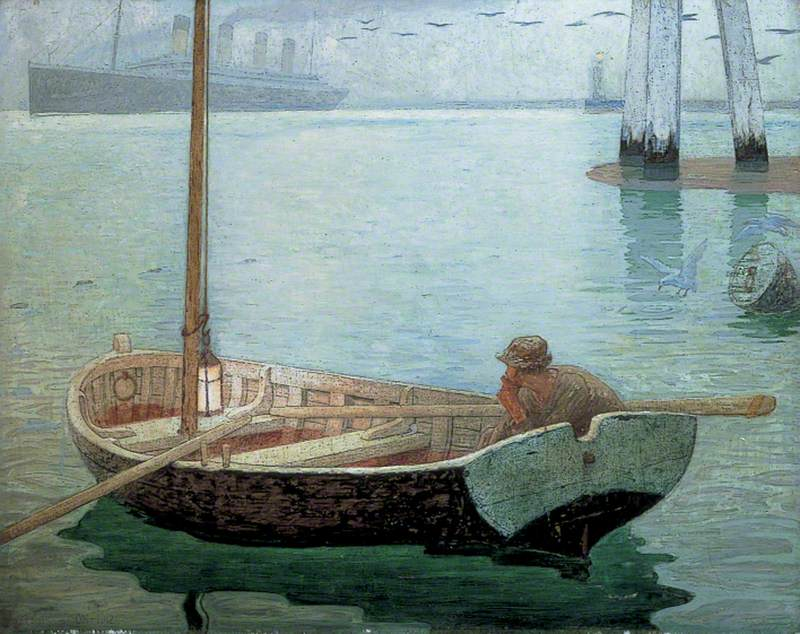
The Outward Bound, 1912, Leeds Art Gallery

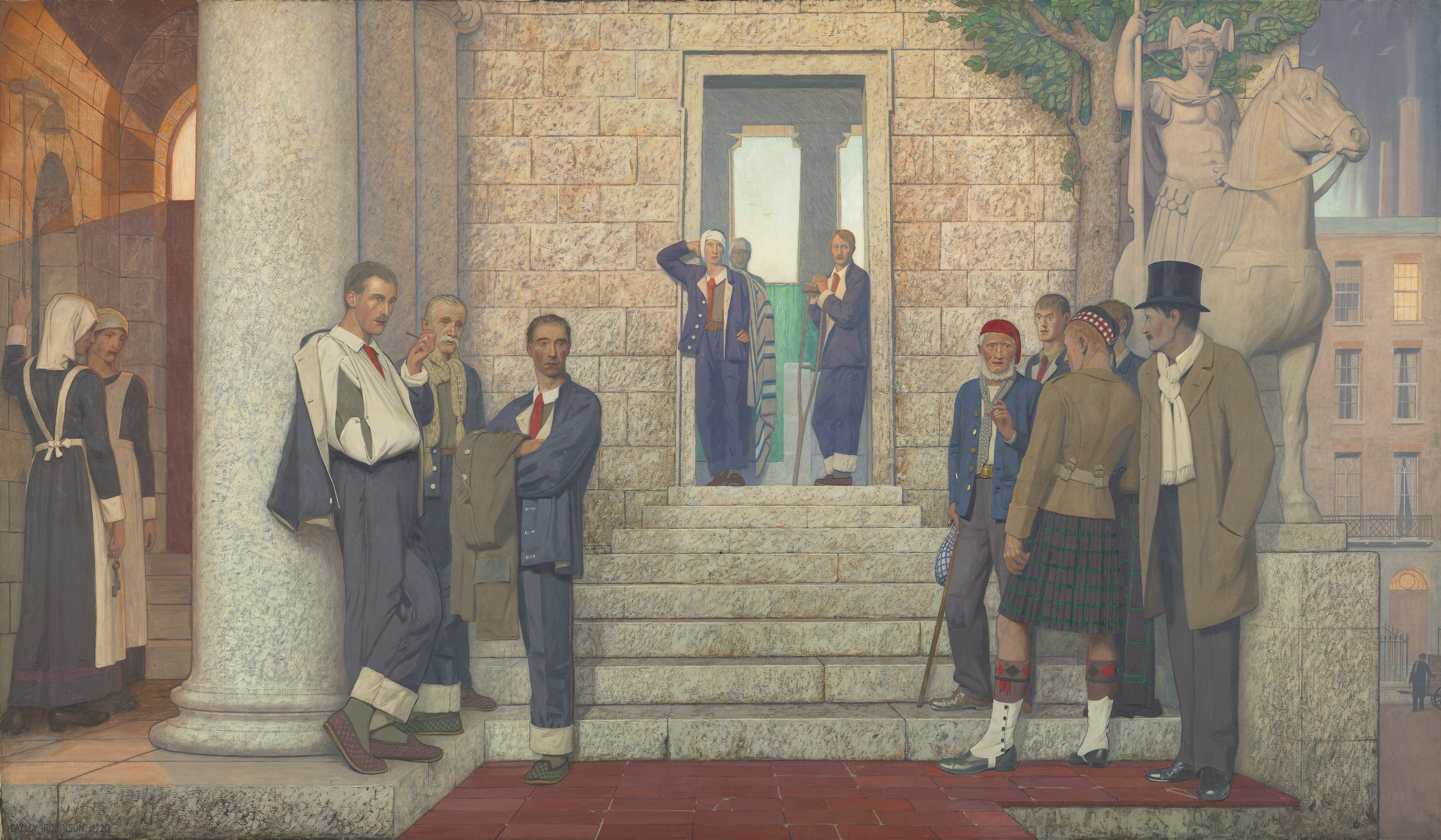
Wounded and sick men gathered outside a hospital, 1920, Wellcome Collection

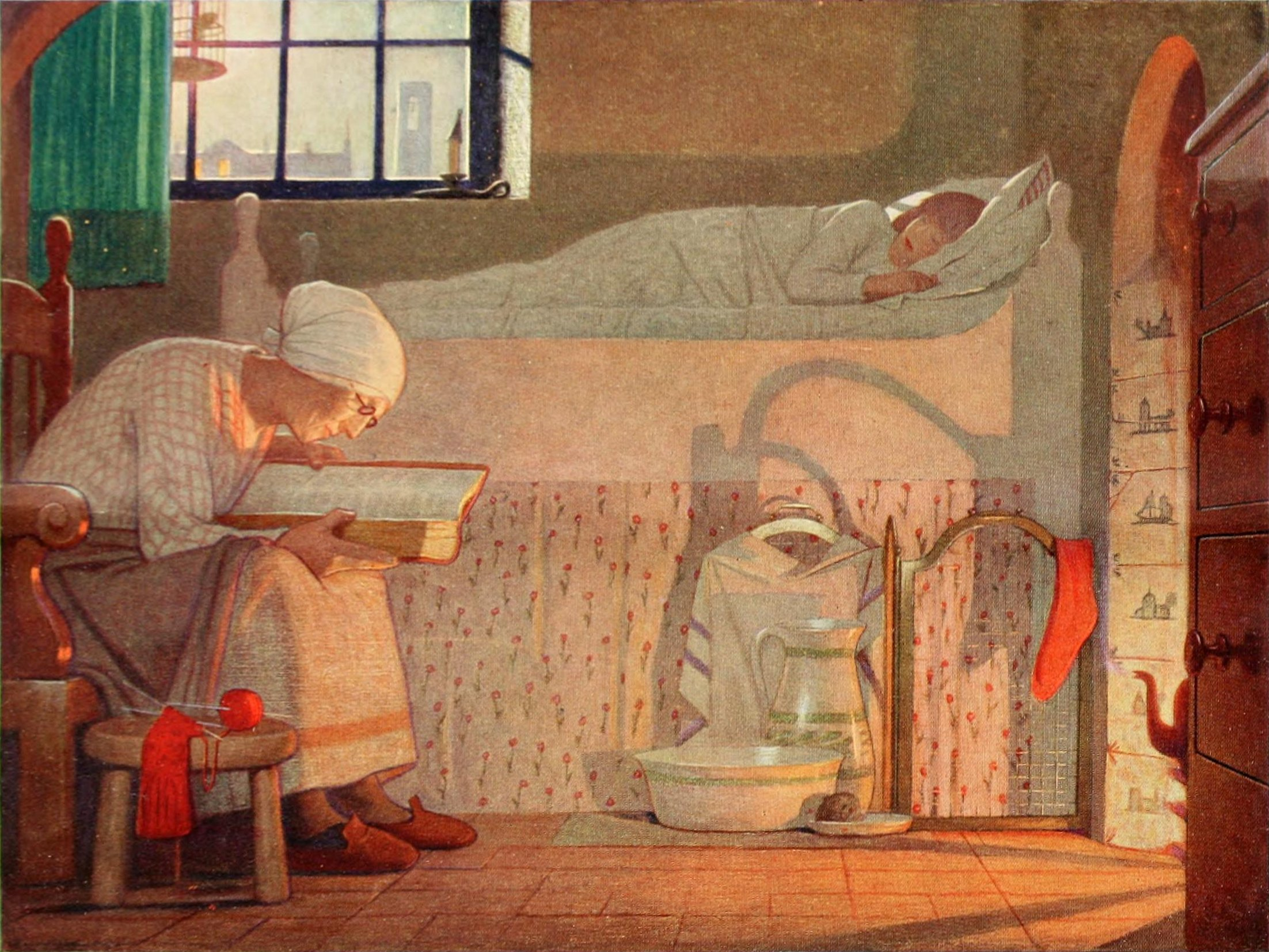
The Word, c. 1922

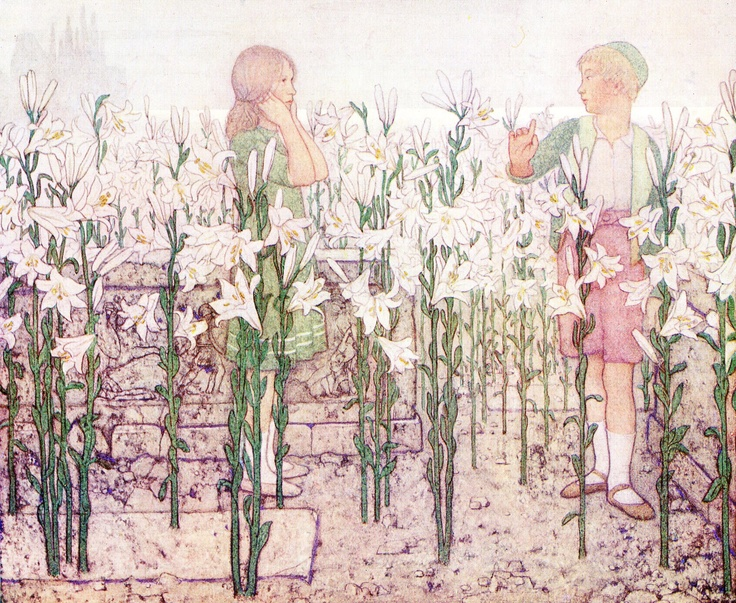
Tyltyl Turns the Diamond, illustration from The Blue Bird, by Maurice Maeterlinck (48th ed. 1923)

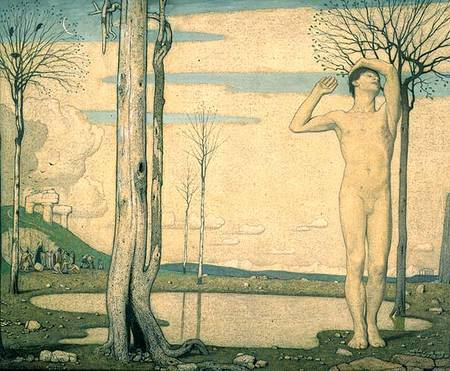
Youth, 1923, private collection

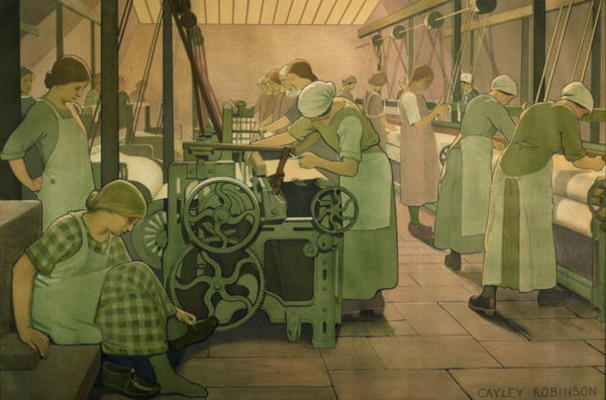
British Industries, 1923, Pinacoteca Nazionale (Siena)

Pastoral, 1923–24, Tate Britain
