= Colne Town Hall =

Municipal building in Colne, Lancashire, England

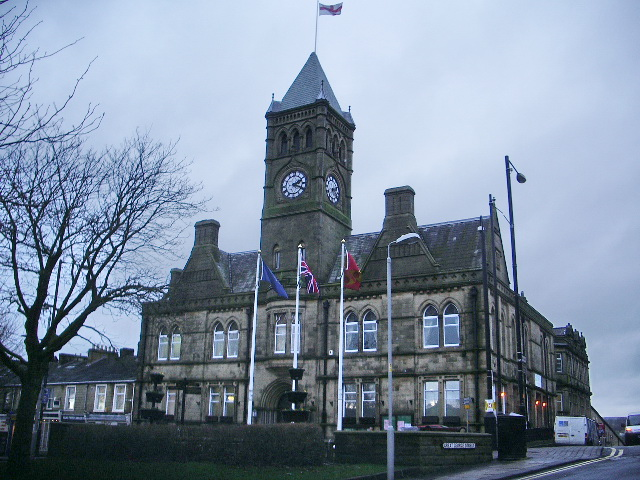
- Colne Town Hall

- Shown in Lancashire Location in Borough of Pendle
- 53.8566°N 2.1713°W
- Location: Albert Road, Colne

History
- Built: 1894

Site notes
- Architect: Alfred Waterhouse
- Architectural style: Gothic style

Listed Building – Grade II
- Official name: Town Hall
- Designated: 29 January 1988
- Reference no.: 1073412

Colne Town Hall is a municipal building in Albert Road, Colne, Lancashire, England. The town hall, which is the meeting place of Colne Town Council, is a grade II listed building.

== History ==
After significant population growth associated with the increasing number of cotton mills in the town, the area became an urban district in 1894. In this context, civic leaders decided the procure a dedicated town hall; the site selected was a vacant site at the corner of two rows of residential properties (Albert Road and New Market Street).

The new building, which was designed by Alfred Waterhouse in the Gothic style, was built with ashlar stone and was officially opened by the chairman of the council, Samuel Catlow, on 13 January 1894. The design involved a symmetrical main frontage with five bays facing onto Albert Road; the central bay featured a doorway flanked by colonettes supporting a stone arch on the ground floor; there was an oriel window on the first floor and a four-stage clock tower with pyramid-shaped roof above. Internally, the principal rooms were the council chamber and the mayor's parlour. The Cambridge quarter-chiming clock was made by Potts of Leeds, and the five bells by Taylor of Loughborough.

A large paving stone, which was hewn from rock from Clough Fold Quarry near Rawtenstall and which measured 10 feet (3.0 m) by 9 feet (2.7 m) and weighed 2 tonnes (4,400 lb), was laid outside the front door of the building during its construction. Investigations conducted by a research team funded by the Heritage Lottery Fund indicated that this paving stone is only exceeded in surface area by the large paving stones in front of St George's Hall in Liverpool. After the area achieved municipal borough status on 14 September 1895, the building became the headquarters of the new borough and Councillor Samuel Catlow became its first mayor.

The building continued to serve as the headquarters of the borough council for much of the 20th century but ceased to be the local seat of government when the enlarged Pendle Borough Council was formed in 1974. It became the meeting place of Colne Town Council when it was formed in 2008.

The town council also took over responsibility for the management of the building in October 2017 and, following a programme of refurbishment works on the ground floor to create "the Waterhouse Bar" as a space for drinks receptions, the town council re-opened the council chamber and the mayor's parlour as venues for marriages and civil partnership ceremonies in February 2020.

== See also ==
- Listed buildings in Colne
