= Dave Walker (footballer, born 1941) =

English footballer

Personal information
- Full name: David Walker
- Date of birth: 15 October 1941
- Place of birth: Colne, England
- Date of death: 21 April 2015 (aged 73)
- Place of death: Hythe, Hampshire, England
- Position: Central defender

Senior career*
Years	Team	Apps	(Gls)
1960–1965	Burnley	38	(1)
1965–1974	Southampton	197	(1)
1974–1975	Cape Town		
Total		235	(2)
- * Club domestic league appearances and goals

David Walker (15 October 1941 – 21 April 2015) was an English professional footballer who played as a central defender for Burnley and Southampton.

He died on 21 April 2015 at the age of 73.
