= Wallace Hartley =

English violinist, and Titanic bandleader (1878–1912)

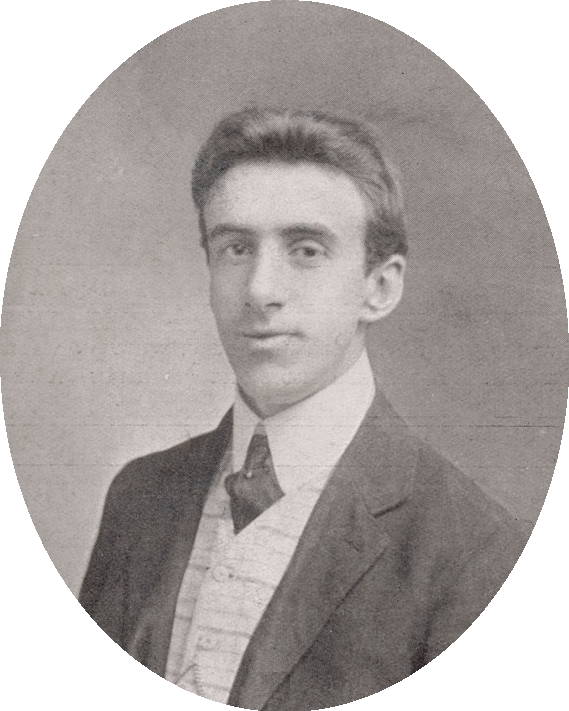
- Portrait of Hartley published in The Illustrated London News, May 1912
- Born: 2 June 1878; Colne, Lancashire, England
- Died: 15 April 1912 (aged 33); North Atlantic Ocean
- Burial place: Keighley Road Cemetery, Colne, Lancashire
- Occupation: Violinist
- Known for: Bandleader aboard RMS Titanic

Wallace Henry Hartley (2 June 1878 – 15 April 1912) was an English violinist, who became best known for his actions during the sinking of the Titanic. The bandleader on the Titanic during its maiden voyage, he led the eight-member band in various pieces as the ship sank on 15 April 1912; neither he nor any of the band survived.

== Life and career ==
Wallace Henry Hartley was born on 2 June 1878 and raised in Colne, Lancashire, England. Hartley's father, Albion Hartley, was the choirmaster and Sunday school superintendent at Bethel Independent Methodist Chapel, on Burnley Road where the family attended worship services. Albion himself introduced the hymn "Nearer, My God, to Thee" to the congregation. Wallace studied at Colne's Methodist day school, sang in Bethel's choir and learned to play the violin from a fellow congregation member.

After leaving school, Hartley started work with the Craven & Union Bank in Colne. When his family moved to Huddersfield, Hartley joined the Huddersfield Philharmonic Orchestra. In 1903, he left home to join the municipal orchestra in Bridlington, where he stayed for six years. He later moved to Dewsbury, Yorkshire and in 1909, he joined the Cunard Line as a musician, serving on the ocean liners RMS Lucania, RMS Lusitania and RMS Mauretania.

Whilst serving on the Mauretania, the employment of Cunard musicians was transferred to the music agency C.W. & F.N. Black, which supplied musicians for Cunard and the White Star Line. This transfer changed Hartley's onboard status, as he was no longer counted as a member of the crew, but rather as a passenger, albeit one accommodated in second-class accommodation at the agency's expense. It later transpired that neither the shipping company nor the music agency had insured the musicians, with each claiming it was the other's responsibility.

In April 1912, Hartley was assigned to be the bandmaster for the White Star Line ship RMS Titanic. He was at first hesitant to again leave his fiancée, Maria Robinson, to whom he had recently proposed. He also wished to meet his family before leaving but was denied permission.

== Sinking of the Titanic ==
After the Titanic hit an iceberg on the night of 14 April 1912 and began to sink, Hartley and his fellow band members started playing music to help keep the passengers calm as the crew loaded the lifeboats. Many of the survivors said Hartley and the band continued to play until the very end. None of the band members survived the sinking, and the story of them playing to the end became popular. A newspaper at the time reported "the part played by the orchestra on board the Titanic in her last dreadful moments will rank among the noblest in the annals of heroism at sea."

Though the final song played by the band is disputed, "Nearer, My God, to Thee" has gained popular acceptance. Walter Lord's book A Night to Remember (1955) popularised wireless officer Harold Bride's account of hearing the song "Autumn". Ellwand Moody, a fellow musician of Hartley on the Mauretania, claimed that Hartley had told him he would play either "Nearer, My God, to Thee" or "Our God, Our Help in Ages Past" if he were ever on a sinking ship. If "Nearer, My God, to Thee" was played, it is uncertain which version Hartley used. His father used the "Propior Deo" version, by Arthur Sullivan, at church, and his family were certain that he would have used that version. It is this tune's opening notes that appear on Hartley's memorial and that were played at his funeral.

Hartley's body was recovered by the Mackay–Bennett almost two weeks after the sinking. Several press reports claimed that Wallace was found "fully dressed with his music case strapped to his body", though this is disputed. The violin that he played on the Titanic was, however, recovered. A gift from his fiancée, Maria Robinson, whom he was to wed in June, it was returned to her.

He was transferred to the Arabic and returned to England. Hartley's father Albion met the ship at Liverpool and brought his son's body back to his home town of Colne, Lancashire. The funeral took place on 18 May 1912. One thousand people attended Hartley's funeral, while an estimated 30,000–40,000 lined the route of his funeral procession.

Hartley is buried in the Keighley Road cemetery, Colne, where a 10 feet (3.0 m) high headstone, containing a carved violin at its base, was erected in his honour.

== Legacy ==
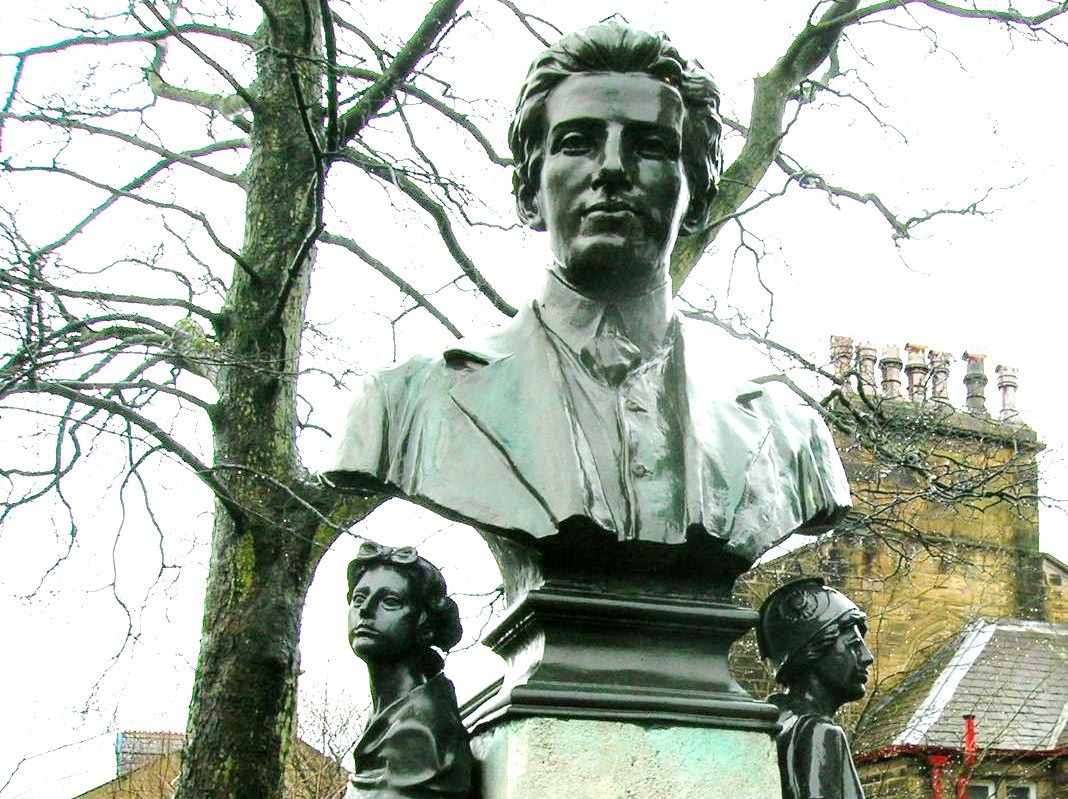
Bust of Wallace Hartley in Albert Road, Colne, Lancashire

=== Memorials ===
A memorial to Hartley, topped by his bust, was erected in 1915 outside what was then the town library. The memorial is inscribed: Wallace Hartley

Bandmaster of the RMS Titanic who perished in the foundering of that vessel, April 15th 1912. Erected by voluntary contributions to commemorate the heroism of a native of this town.

This was later moved slightly to make way for the World War One memorial. Hartley's large Victorian terraced house in West Park Street, Dewsbury, West Yorkshire, bears a blue plaque to remind passers-by that this was the bandleader's home.

Another memorial to the Titanic musicians as a whole was erected in Broken Hill, in north-west New South Wales. The people of Broken Hill were so moved by the bravery of the ship's bandsmen that within a few weeks they had launched a public appeal to create a memorial to them. The memorial, in the shape of a broken pillar, was unveiled in December 1913. The City of Ballarat, Victoria, Australia, has an Edwardian bandstand to commemorate the musicians lost. It was erected by the Ballarat Council with funds raised by the Victorian Band Association, and citizens of the area. The Titanic Memorial bandstand, was unveiled on October 22, 1915. Every year on the anniversary of the sinking of the Titanic, a band still plays "Nearer, My God, To Thee", in the bandstand. In 2001, Hartley's name was still being used when naming new streets and housing in the town of Colne. In 2008, the pub chain J D Wetherspoon named a newly opened pub, (the building having been the long-standing King's Head Hotel up until the mid-1990s), in Colne after the bandleader.

=== Painting ===
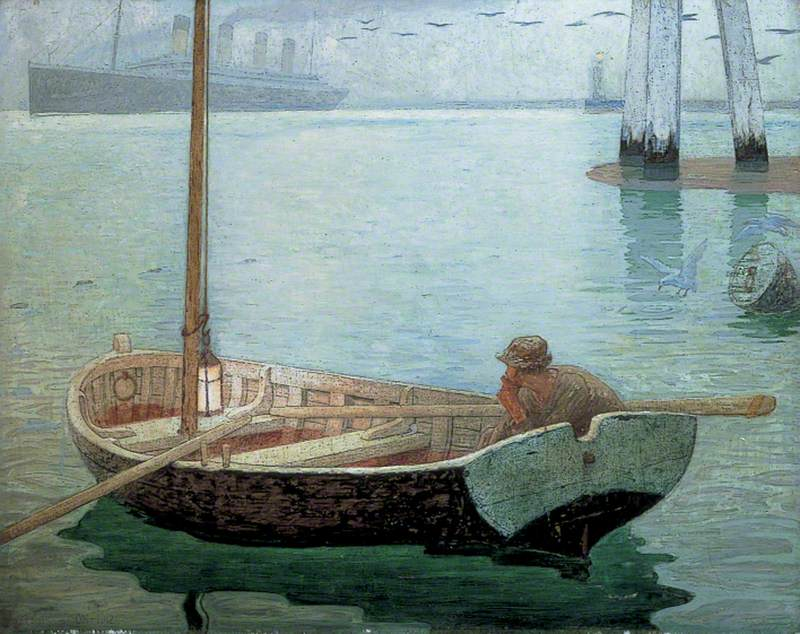
The Outward Bound, 1912, by Frederick Cayley Robinson

Frederick Cayley Robinson's 1912 oil painting The Outward Bound shows a youth in a boat watching as Titanic leaves Southampton. It was commissioned in memory of Hartley, and given to Leeds Art Gallery by the Leeds Professional Musicians. The painting was unveiled in the City Art Gallery by the Lord Mayor of Leeds on 23 December 1912.

=== Violin ===
After Maria Robinson's death in 1939, her sister gave the violin to the Bridlington Salvation Army and told its leader, a Major Renwick, about the instrument's association with the Titanic. It was later passed on to a violin teacher, who gave it to a woman, a former pupil. In 2004 or 2006, it was discovered in an attic by her son. "It's been in the same family for over 70 years," Henry Aldridge & Sons stated.

In March 2013, after two years of in-depth trace analysis by The Forensic Science Service on behalf of auctioneers Henry Aldridge & Son, and seven years of evidence-gathering by the Wiltshire-based auction house, it was announced that a violin found in a British man's attic inside a leather case with the initials "W. H. H." was the instrument used by Hartley during the ship's last moments. The identification was helped by an engraving on the German-made violin which his fiancée (Maria Robinson) had placed on the instrument in 1910 which read: 'For Wallace on the occasion of our engagement from Maria.' Further tests by a silver expert from the Gemmological Association of Great Britain confirmed that the plate on the base of the violin was original and that the metal engraving done on behalf of Maria Robinson was contemporary with those made in 1910. A CT scan enabled experts to view 3D images of the inside of the violin. The fine detail of the scan meant experts could examine the construction, interior and the glue holding the instrument together showing signs of possible restoration. While researching the origins of the violin, the auctioneers Henry Aldridge & Son and Christian Tennyson-Ekeberg, biographer of Wallace Hartley and author of Nearer, Our God, to Thee: The Biography of the Titanic Bandmaster, discovered the transcript of a telegram sent to the Provincial Secretary of Nova Scotia, Canada, dated 19 July 1912 in the diary of Hartley's grieving fiancée, Ms. Robinson, in which she stated, "I would be most grateful if you could convey my heartfelt thanks to all who have made possible the return of my late fiancé's violin." Craig Sopin, the owner of one of the world's largest collections of Titanic memorabilia, a leading Titanic expert, and a general skeptic of Titanic claims believes the violin is "Hartley's violin and not a fraud," reported ABC News.

The Hartley violin was exhibited in Northern Ireland at the shipyard where the RMS Titanic was built (Harland and Wolff), Titanic Belfast, and in the United States at Titanic Branson and Titanic Pigeon Forge museums. It was sold by auction house Henry Aldridge & Son in Devizes, Wiltshire, England, on 19 October 2013 for £900,000 ($1.7 million US).

The violin now resides at Titanic Belfast Museum and is open to public viewing. It has two large cracks and is no longer playable.

After seeing the violin auctioned at Aldridges, British folk singer/songwriter Reg Meuross was inspired to write a song about the story of the violin, "The Band Played Sweet Marie", that was released on his album England Green and England Grey in 2014.

The story of Wallace Hartley and his violin is also the inspiration behind the song "Titanically" written by Canadian singer/songwriter Heather Rankin and David Tyson, with a music video directed by American-Canadian filmmaker Thom Fitzgerald. The music video was released on 2 June 2017, to honour Hartley's birthday.

=== Portrayals ===
On screen, Hartley has been played by:

- Charles Belchier in A Night to Remember (1958 film adaptation of Walter Lord's eponymous 1955 book)
- Victor Langley in S.O.S. Titanic (1979 television movie)
- Jonathan Evans-Jones in Titanic (1997 film)
- Csongor Veer in Titanic (2012 television miniseries)
- Brendan Petrizzo (2022) Titanic 666 (television movie)
