= Colne =

Market town in Lancashire, England

Coordinates: 53.8554°N 2.1756°W

- Colne, with its town hall on the horizon

- Shown within Pendle Borough Location within Lancashire
- Population: 17,855 (2011 Census)
- OS grid reference: SD884399
- Civil parish: Colne
- District: Pendle
- Shire county: Lancashire
- Region: North West
- Country: England
- Sovereign state: United Kingdom
- Post town: COLNE
- Postcode district: BB8
- Dialling code: 01282
- Police: Lancashire
- Fire: Lancashire
- Ambulance: North West
- UK Parliament: Pendle and Clitheroe
- Website: www.cometocolne.com

Colne (/kɒln/) is a market town and civil parish in the Borough of Pendle in Lancashire, England. The town is 3 miles (5 km) northeast of Nelson, 6 miles (10 km) northeast of Burnley and 25 mi (40 km) east of Preston.

The town should not be confused with the unrelated Colne Valley around the River Colne near Huddersfield in West Yorkshire.

Colne is close to the southern entrance to the Aire Gap, the lowest crossing of the Pennine watershed. The M65 terminates west of the town and from here two main roads take traffic onwards towards the Yorkshire towns of Skipton (A56) and Keighley (A6068). Colne railway station is the terminus of the East Lancashire railway line.

Colne adjoins the Pendle parishes of Foulridge, Laneshaw Bridge, Trawden Forest, Nelson, Barrowford and Blacko.

== History ==
Settlement in the area can be traced back to the Stone Age. A Mesolithic camp site, a Bronze Age burial site and stone tools from the Bronze and Stone Ages have been discovered at nearby Trawden. There are also the remains of an Iron Age fort, dating from the 6th century BC, above Colne at Castercliff.

Although a Roman road passes through nearby Barnoldswick, and some Roman coins have been discovered, there is no conclusive evidence of the Romans having occupied the area. There is, however, some debate among local historians as to whether the Romans may have stayed at Castercliff.

From the early 6th century to the late 10th century, Colne came under Northumbrian and then Viking rule, finally coming firmly under Norman control in the 11th century. Then, from the 1090s until 1311, the area was controlled by the de Lacys of Pontefract from their outpost at Clitheroe Castle. Pendle Forest and Trawden Forest date from this period; forests in those times being hunting grounds for royals and other nobles. St Bartholomew's Church dates from before 1122 when the town's market was located in the churchyard. The churchyard used to house the market cross and wooden stocks on wheels and people were placed in these on market days. The stocks are now located in the nearby library. The market cross is in Market Street.

The town developed in two parts: Colne, on top of the ridge; and Waterside, at the base of the southern slope, next to Colne Water. By 1296, a corn mill and a fulling mill had been established down by the river. By the 15th century, Colne had become the main market town in the area with markets (latterly held on Tuesdays) and a major centre for the woollen trade, in particular for the production of lightweight kersey. With the Industrial Revolution, cotton manufacturing became the main industry in the town, fuelled by the completion of the Leeds and Liverpool Canal in 1816, and by the arrival of the railway in 1848.

The cross allows a market to be held there and dates back to the 15th century. The market cross was originally at the junction of Colne Lane and Church Street. It was first moved to the grounds of The Gables on Albert Road, the location of Colne Library until around 1970. It has now been relocated to outside the Market Hall on Market Street, part of the main road through the town centre.

The rise of Chartism saw riots here over the imposition of the 'new' police force in April and August 1840. John Halstead, a special constable, was killed by a mob armed with sharpened iron rails during the second. In both cases troops marched from Burnley Barracks and the violence ceased with their arrival.

Colne is on the edge of the Burnley Coalfield and coal was being mined at Fox Clough, to south of the town, from the early 17th century. Fox Clough Colliery also known as Engine Pit, was started by the Executors of John Hargreaves company, probably around 1832. By the 1840s, a surface drift was located at the foot of the clough, on the south side of Colne Water, and a tramroad crossed the river connecting the colliery to a coal yard in the town. It seems the coal here was not of a high quality, as during the winter of 1860 a local newspaper reported that the frozen canal and diversion of railway wagons had forced the inhabitants of Colne, to resort to town's coal pit. Fox Clough Colliery was abandoned in 1872, but Trawden Colliery (1874 - 1890), located about 200 metres up the valley, continued production from the same workings. The tramroad was marked as disused in 1893. By 1891, there were 30 cotton mills listed in Colne with more in the surrounding areas of Trawden and Laneshaw Bridge. The largest had 2,400 looms and the smallest 56.

== Governance ==
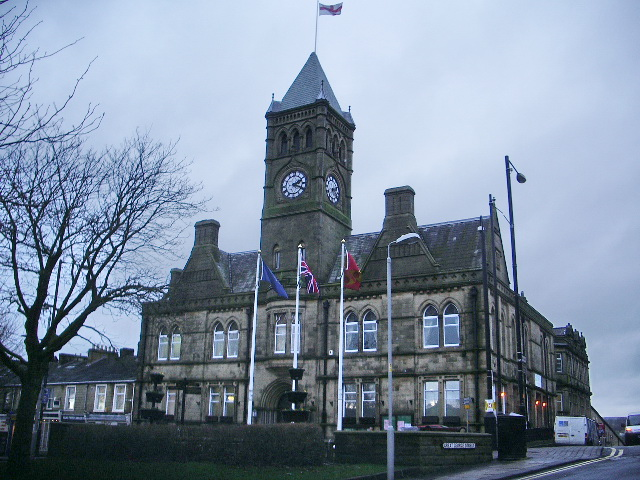
Colne Town Hall

Colne was once a township in the ancient parish of Whalley which became a civil parish in 1866. A local board was formed in 1875, the district including part of Great Marsden, on the south side of Colne Water between Fox Clough and Swinden Clough. This area was made an urban district in 1894 and designated a Municipal Borough in 1895. In 1935 the borough absorbed an area to the east around Barnside, historically a detached part of Foulridge.

In 1974, under the Local Government Act 1972, Colne became part of the Borough of Pendle. Initially Colne formed part of an unparished area, in 1992 a new civil parish of Laneshaw Bridge was created from what had been the eastern side of the municipal borough. A new Colne civil parish was formed in 2008. A town council was re-established at that time; it meets in Colne Town Hall, which was designed by Alfred Waterhouse and opened in 1894.

After boundary changes in 2020 which reduced the number of wards in the borough to 12, three cover parts of Colne parish – Boulsworth & Foulridge, Waterside & Horsfield, and Vivary Bridge. The town is represented on Lancashire County Council in two divisions: Pendle Central and Pendle Rural.

The Member of Parliament for Pendle and Clitheroe, the constituency into which the town falls, is Jonathan Hinder (Labour), who was first elected in 2024.

== Demographics ==
Population of Colne over time
Year	1901	1911	1921	1931	1939	1951	1961	2001	2011
Population	23,000	25,689	24,752	23,791	21,501	20,670	19,430	20,118	17,855
UD (pre-1974) UA (2001) CP (2011 onwards)

The town's population declined during the 20th century, as was the case in many Lancashire mill towns, decreasing from 26,000 in 1911 to approximately 19,000 in 1961.

The United Kingdom Census 2011 recorded a total resident population of 17,855 for Colne civil parish. The town forms part of a wider urban area that had a population of 149,796 in 2001. A similar but larger Burnley Built-up area, as defined in the 2011 census, had a population of 149,422.

In 2011, the racial composition of the town was 95.8% White (93.9% White British), 3.0% Asian, 0.1% Black, 0.9% Mixed, and 0.1% Other. The largest religious groups were Christian (58.5%) and Muslim (2.5%). Among residents aged 16 to 74, 68.5% were classified as economically active and in employment.

== Economy ==
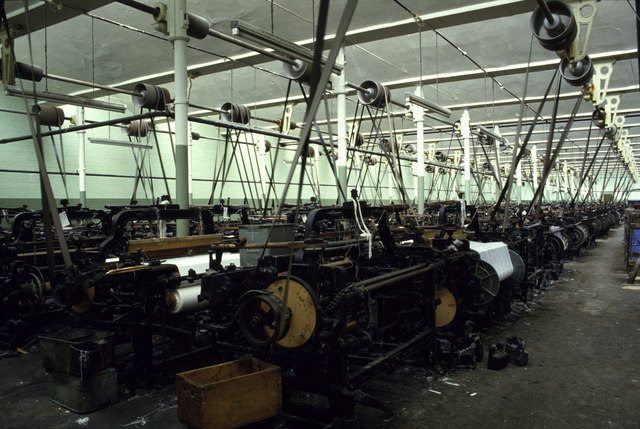
A typical weaving shed at Queen Street Mill Textile Museum, Burnley

Colne's former cotton industry has all but disappeared. Many of the textile weaving mills that used to punctuate the landscape have been demolished to make way for new retail outlets and modern housing. Others lie semi-derelict, but the best examples continue to provide jobs for local residents by accommodating new manufacturing and service businesses. Strong growth has been experienced in precision engineering, particularly associated with the aerospace sector, as Rolls-Royce Aerospace operates a large wide chord fan-blade manufacturing facility in nearby Barnoldswick.

The town's main employment area is located at Whitewalls, which sits astride the boundary with Nelson adjacent to Junction 14 on the M65 motorway. To help stimulate development an undeveloped 5 hectare area of the estate was designated as part of the East Lancashire Enterprise Zone in December 1983 making it, at that time, the smallest Enterprise Zone in the country. This successful estate now extends to over 27 hectares and is home to a wide range businesses including a large abattoir. Walshaw House, the headquarters of the East Lancashire Primary Care Trust, which occupies a recent extension to the estate, reflects recent growth in the service sector.

The adjacent retail park contains a large ASDA supermarket and stores for Next and DFS. Boundary Mill Stores, one of the first factory outlets in the UK, was established here in 1983, but in 2008 it moved into purpose built premises closer to the end of the M65 motorway. In 2013, it is the borough's largest employer, and has stores in Grantham, Newcastle, Walsall and Rotherham.

Another local success story was Lyon's Tours, whose headquarters were off Albert Road, close to the town centre. A family-run business, in the 1950s it became one of the first UK tour operators to offer overseas holidays to its customers. The company became part of Airtours when David Crossland purchased a series of small travel agencies across Lancashire in 1972, which in turn merged with the Thomas Cook Group in June 2007.

== Landmarks ==
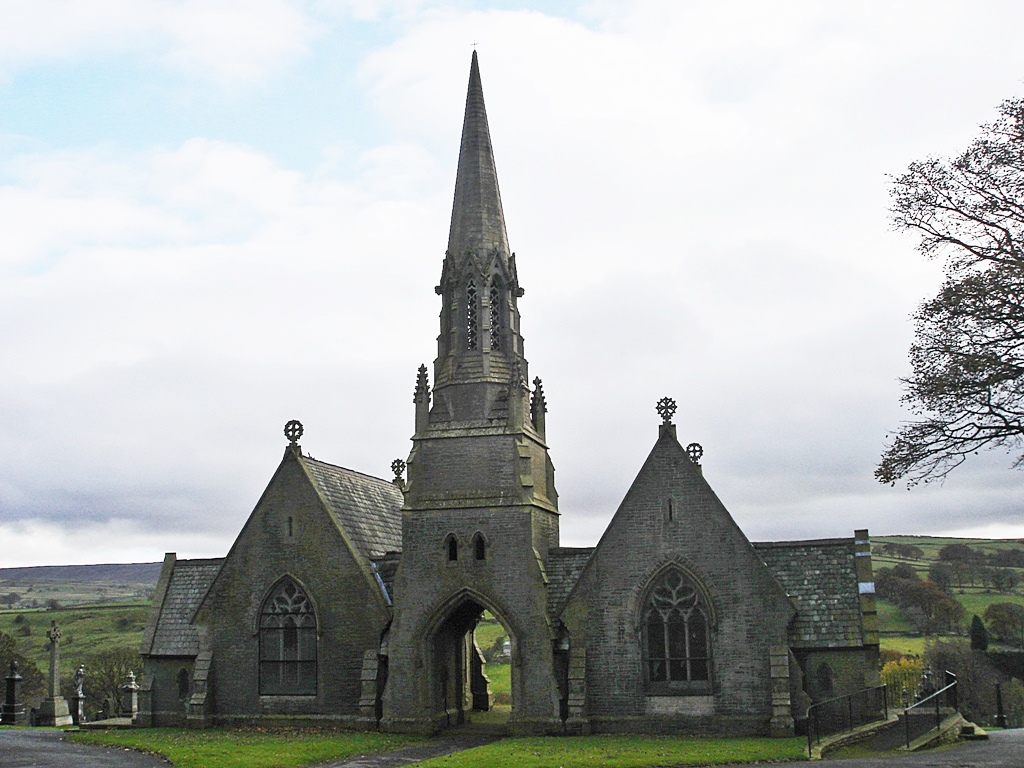
Entrance to Colne Cemetery

Situated on the edge of the Pennines, Colne has views of several well-known hills. Boulsworth Hill, which lies on the boundary between Lancashire and West Yorkshire overlooks the town from the south. From the summit of Noyna Hill to the north, close to the village of Foulridge, it is possible to look out across much of East Lancashire and into the Yorkshire Dales. Blacko Tower (Stansfield Tower) is clearly visible to the north west, across White Moor, which forms the long eastern slope of Weets Hill.

The hamlet of Wycoller, off the road to Haworth, is the focus for the Country Park of the same name. Although traffic free (visitors must park outside the village), the peace and tranquility is often broken in the summer months as tourists are drawn to the visitor centre alongside the ruined hall. From here a network of footpaths and bridleways pass through the ford or cross Wycoller Beck on a series of ancient bridges, up to 1,000 years old. A series of circular walks traverse the lower slopes of Boulsworth Hill, whilst the long distance Bronte Way passes through en route to Haworth.

Colne is approximately 5 miles east of Pendle Hill, arguably the most well-known local landmark. Owing to its association with the Pendle witches, many local people walk up the hill, but particularly at Halloween. Several nearby farmhouses are reputed to be haunted, and have featured on the TV programmes Most Haunted and Most Haunted Live!

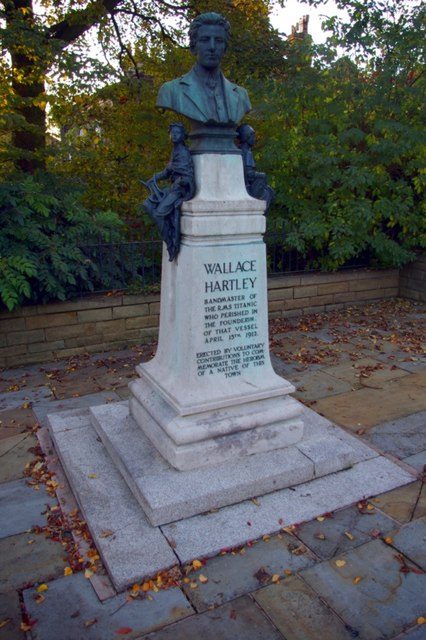
Memorial to Wallace Hartley in Albert Road

The town is also known for Wallace Hartley, bandmaster on the RMS Titanic, to whom a memorial was erected, on Albert Road, in 1915. Wallace lived in Colne and is buried in the local cemetery.

== Transport ==
Colne is connected to the national railway network. Colne railway station is 3/4 mile (1 km) west of the town centre. It forms the eastern terminus of the East Lancashire Line, which runs to Nelson, Brierfield, Burnley and on to Preston and Blackpool. The line beyond Colne, formerly part of the Midland Railway, was closed by British Rail in 1970, but since 2001 the Skipton–East Lancashire Rail Action Partnership (SELRAP) has petitioned for the reopening up of the line between Colne and Skipton, as yet without success.

The local bus company, Burnley & Pendle, was part-owned until 1996 by the two borough councils. There are buses every few minutes during the daytime on the 'Main Line' service between Burnley bus station and Colne town centre. Most of these then fork in various directions at each end, and continue to Padiham, Clitheroe or Accrington from Burnley, and to Earby, Barnoldswick, Trawden or Keighley from Colne. Until 2005 the town had a direct bus service to Manchester in the shape of route X43, but this was withdrawn following low usage, with the frequency along the Main Line routes improved to compensate. They also operate an hourly service between Skipton and Burnley via Colne.

The Leeds and Liverpool Canal passes to the north-west of Colne. Beyond Barrowford Locks, barges enter the summit level and then the 1,630-yard-long (1,490 m) Foulridge Tunnel. Close to the western portal, water from three reservoirs built between 1793 and 1866 feed the summit level.

== Education ==
=== Colne Grammar School ===
Colne Grammar School was a focus for education from the Middle Ages and had John Tillotson an Archbishop of Canterbury (1691–1694) amongst its alumni. Construction of the 'new school' on Barrowford Road was completed 1941. It finally closed in the late 20th century when Nelson and Colne College, which then occupied the building, consolidated its operations on a site in nearby Barrowford. The red brick building, was converted to apartments in 2009 and now forms the centrepiece of an executive housing development known as The Locks.

=== Pre-schools ===
There are several pre-schools in the area which are spread across the town.

=== Primary schools ===
There are several primary schools in the Colne area, one of which is a Catholic school. The schools in the town are:

- Colne Lord Street Primary School
- West Street Community Primary School
- Sacred Heart Catholic school
- Colne Primet Primary School
- Colne Park Primary School
- Colne Christ Church Church of England Voluntary Aided Primary School

Schools in the immediate area include:

- Foulridge St Michael and All Angels CofE Voluntary Aided Primary School
- Trawden Forest Primary School
- Laneshaw Bridge Primary School

For details of more schools around Colne see Foulridge, Trawden, Nelson, Laneshaw Bridge and Brierfield.

=== High schools ===
There are also three high schools in Colne: Colne Primet Academy, Park High School and Ss John Fisher and Thomas More RC High School.

=== Colleges and further education ===
Nelson and Colne College is the main provider of post-16 education in the area – there is no grammar school or continuing sixth form centre, the nearest being in Burnley and Skipton. Nelson and Colne College offers AS-level and A-level qualifications, as well as BTEC, City and Guilds, Open College of the North West and some professional qualifications. The college also has tie-ins with some higher education institutions.

== Religion ==
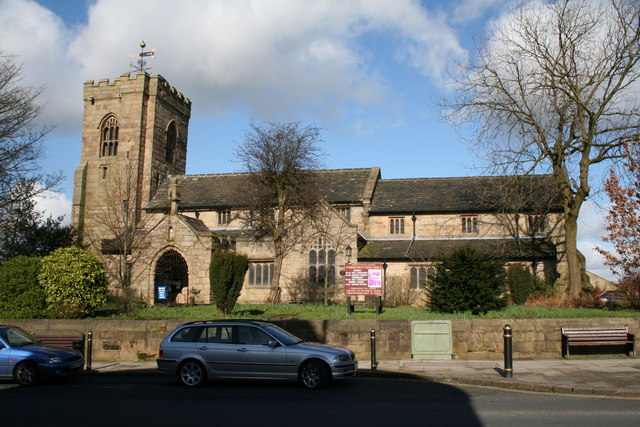
St Bartholomew's Church

St Bartholomew's Church, on Church Street, dates from before 1122 when the town's market was located in the churchyard. In 1988 the church was designated a Grade I listed building by English Heritage. The Grade I listing is for buildings "of exceptional interest, sometimes considered to be internationally important".

Other churches and former churches in the town include the Church of England Christ Church (founded 1836), Holy Trinity Church and St. Bartholomew's Church; Mount Zion United Methodist Church and St John's Methodist Church; Sacred Heart Roman Catholic Church; the Salvation Army Hall on Market Place (now a Citizens Advice Bureau); and Trinity Baptist Church. Bethel Independent Methodist Church, dating from 1871, was the church of RMS Titanic's bandmaster Wallace Hartley.

Church records exist for no fewer than thirty-four different places of worship and nine cemeteries.

== Sports and leisure ==
Colne F.C., established in 1996, is the town's football team; it currently plays in the North West Counties Football League Premier Division. Their predecessor at Holt House Stadium Colne Dynamoes F.C. received heavy investment from a local entrepreneur in the 1980s, but after winning the Northern Premier League crown in 1989/90 were refused entry to the Football Conference and folded before the start of the following season. Burnley F.C., which plays in the Premier League enjoys strong support in the town. The town also has a junior football club, Colne JFC, which runs teams for 8- to 16-year-olds, as well as a senior team.

Colne & Nelson Rugby Union Football Club play at Holt House Playing Fields and the club celebrated its centenary in 2015. It runs two senior teams a Ladies' team and a massive Junior and Mini Colts section.

Colne Cricket Club was formed in 1830 and is the oldest cricket club in the Lancashire League. It has been a continuous member of the Lancashire League since 1890. The first games were played on the Horsfield, the same field that is used today.

Pendle Leisure Trust runs the Pendle Leisure Centre next to the railway station. The facility has two swimming pools, a fitness centre and gymnasium, sauna and sports hall. In summer 2013, the outdoor all-weather pitch was replaced by Urban Altitude. This outdoor aerial assault course is the first of its kind to be built in the UK in an urban location. It includes high and low rope courses, up to 42 ft off the ground, a 60m Zip-Wire, Leap of Faith, Power Fan Free-fall, Jacobs Ladder and Climbing Wall.

The nine-hole Colne Golf Club is located at Law Farm, to the north east of the town.

There are two large local parks: King George V Playing Fields on Skipton Road (A56) and Alkincoats Park, off the road between Colne and Barrowford (B6247). Alkincoats Park, once the estate of Alkincoats Hall, has bowling greens, hard surface tennis courts, pitch and put golf, a children's play area and footpaths that lead to areas close to the Leeds and Liverpool Canal and the now-dismantled Colne to Skipton railway line. The towpath of the Leeds and Liverpool Canal and the trackbed of the dismantled Colne to Skipton railway are also popular leisure destinations, as is Ballgrove Picnic Area at the eastern edge of Colne, close to Laneshaw Bridge. It is possible to walk from here to historic Wycoller.

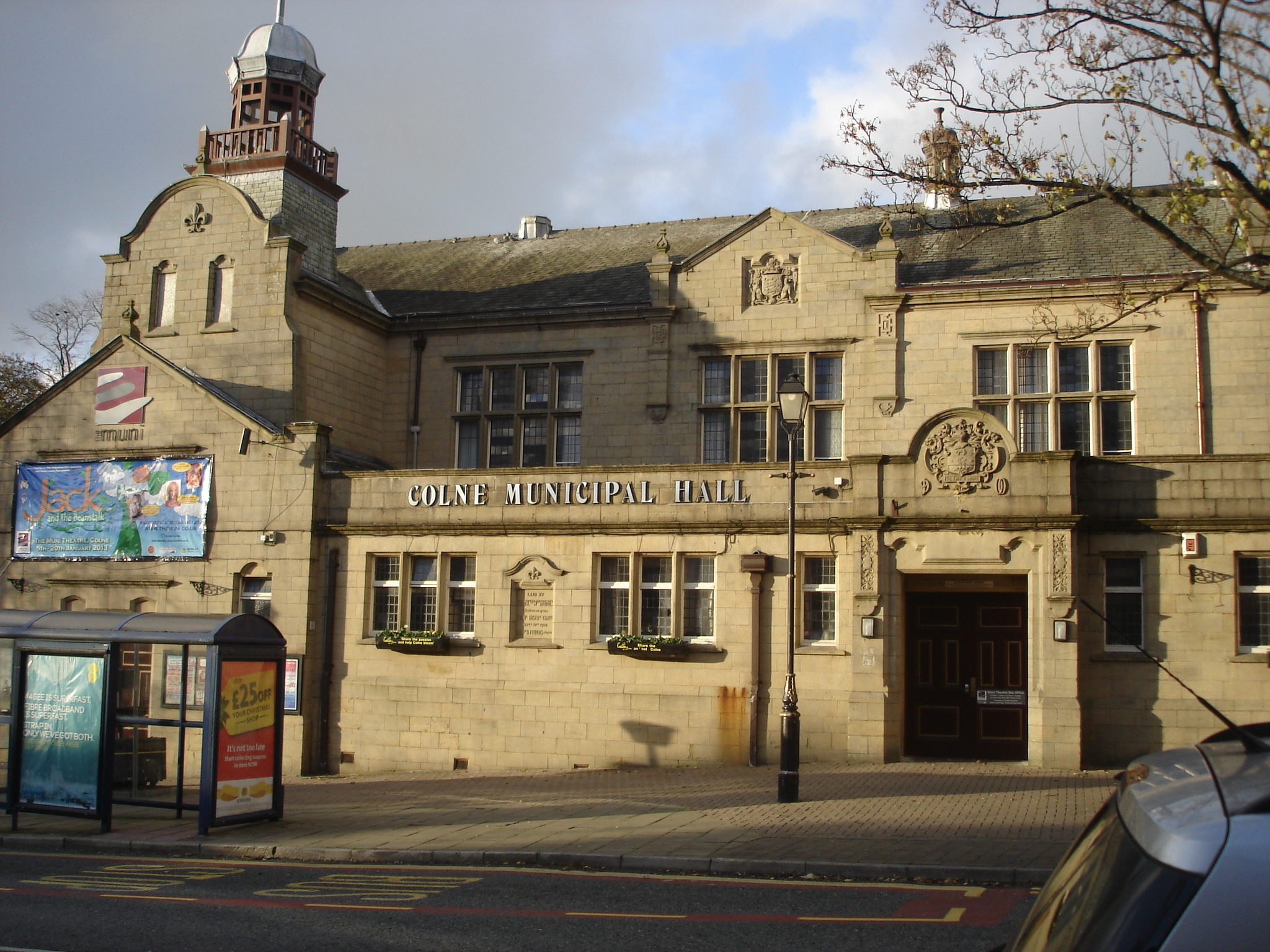
Municipal Hall

There is an active sailing club at Lake Burwain one of the feeder lakes to the Leeds and Liverpool Canal.

Since 2004, Colne has hosted the annual Colne Grand Prix cycle race, part of British Cycling's Elite Circuit Series. The course follows an 800-metre circuit of the one-way road system around the town centre. In 2013, Olympic Gold medallist Ed Clancy MBE, representing Rapha Condor JLT, became the first repeat winner of the race.

Ralph, the father of the late Roger Bannister the first sub-four-minute miler in 1954, was born in Colne, the family having lived here for 400 years. "Roger Bannister and the Four-minute Mile by John Bale"

Every August bank holiday since 1989, the award-winning Great British Rhythm and Blues Festival has been hosted at venues throughout the town, attracting artists and visitors from across the world. Many local pubs and clubs stage music gigs; others hold 'fringe' type performances. The larger events are staged at the Municipal Hall close to the town centre.

A second festival, the Colne Gala, has been held on every year (except two) for the past five decades; the first Gala being held in 1959. It begins with a parade through the town centre, which then proceeds towards Alkincoats Park and Holt House, where there are live events, a fairground, charity stalls and children's attractions.

Colne also has a buoyant night-time economy, with a number of restaurants in the vicinity of its three theatres: the amateur-run Pendle Hippodrome Theatre; The Municipal Hall ('The Muni'), which hosts concerts, exhibitions and the annual pantomime, and the Little Theatre, home of Colne Dramatic Society.

== Media ==
The area is served by television from ITV Granada and BBC North West. It is also served by radio from BBC Radio Lancashire, Capital Manchester and Lancashire which replaced 2BR in April 2019, and Pendle Community Radio, a community radio service aimed at the borough's British Asian population.

A local newspaper, the Colne Times, a variant edition of the larger Burnley Express, is published on Fridays. A second midweek edition, the Pendle Express, aimed at both Colne and neighbouring Nelson, is published on Tuesdays. The town is also served by the Lancashire Telegraph, which publishes a Burnley, Pendle and Rossendale edition six days a week and by a weekly freesheet, the 'Pendle Citizen', which appears on Thursdays.

Colne along with the neighbouring town of Nelson are mentioned in the 1991 song, It's Grim Up North by the band The Justified Ancients of Mu Mu.

== Notable people ==
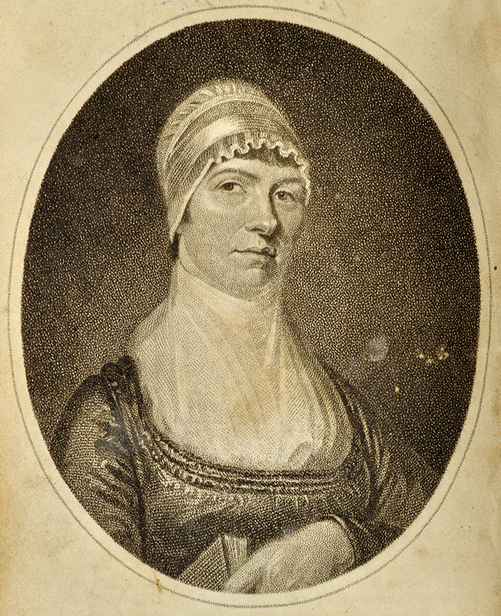
Mary Taft, 1827

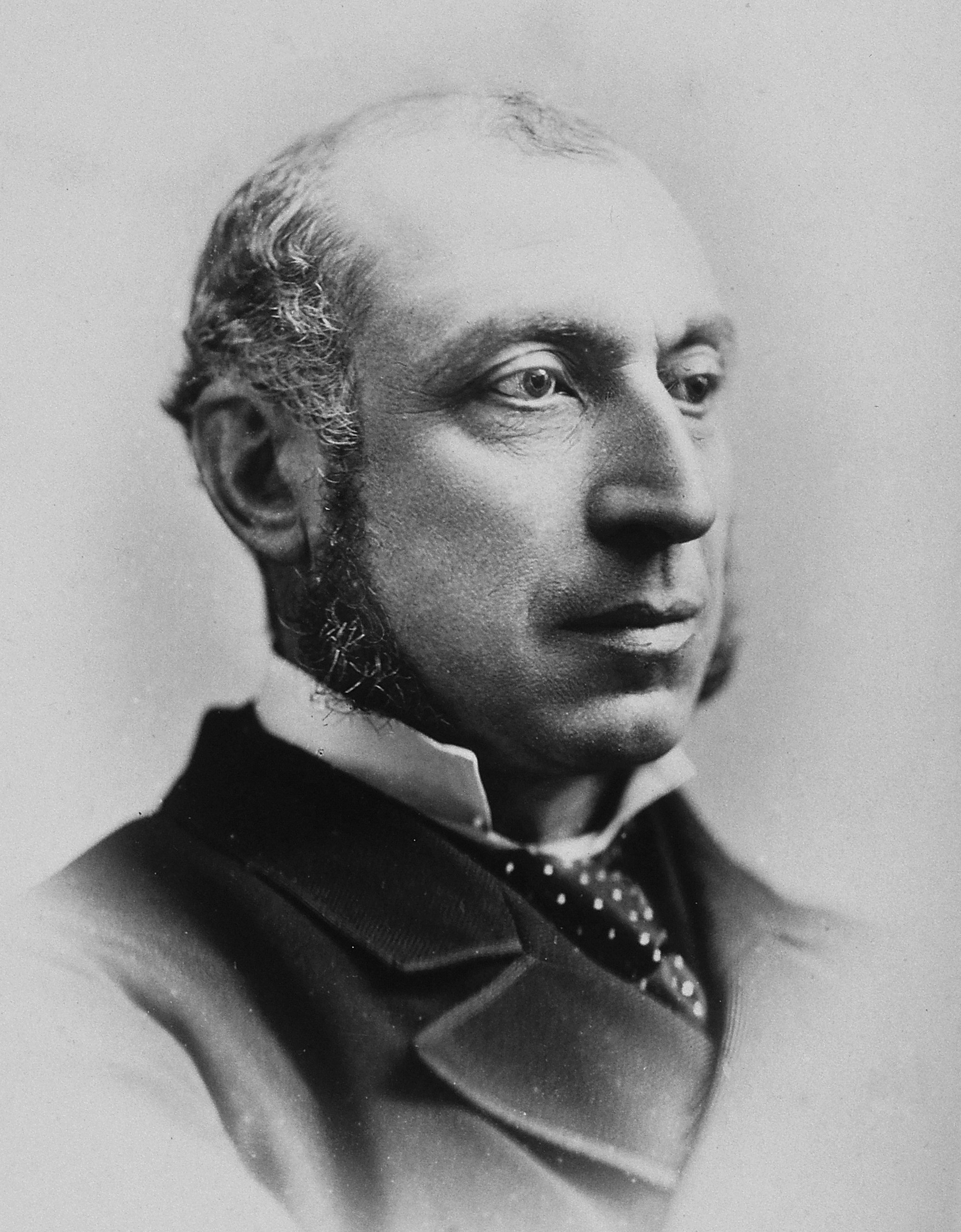
Walter Butler Cheadle, 1881

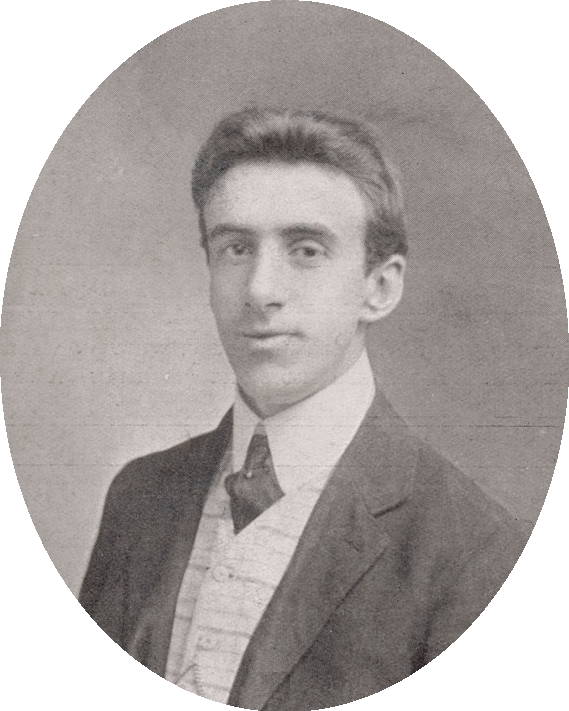
Wallace Hartley, 1912

- Mary Taft (1772–1851), early Methodist preacher
- Walter Butler Cheadle (1836–1910), paediatrician, explored Canada in 1860's
- Sir William Pickles Hartley (1846–1922), manufacturer of Hartley's jam and philanthropist,
- Thomas Arthur Leonard (1864–1948), social reformer, helped develop the Youth Hostels Association & The Ramblers Association
- Christiana Hartley (1872–1948), social and welfare rights activist and politician
- Tom Shaw (1872–1938), politician, MP for Preston from 1918 to 1931.
- Wallace Hartley (1878–1912), bandleader aboard the RMS Titanic
- Sydney Silverman (1895–1968), MP for Nelson & Colne, 1935–68, sponsored the Murder (Abolition of Death Penalty) Act 1965.
- Tom Emmott (1907–1964), writer and political activist, founded the "Lancastrian Party" and stood in the 1959 general election
- Edward A. Irving (1927–2014), British-Canadian geologist, studied paleomagnetism which lead to the theory of continental drift
- John Cunliffe (1933–2018), children's book author and TV presenter of Postman Pat and Rosie and Jim
- Sir Andrew Likierman (born 1943), former senior civil servant and Dean of the London Business School
- Alastair Little (1950–2022), chef, cookbook author and restaurateur.
- Bill Thomas (born 1959), a business executive at Electronic Data Systems (EDS) for 25 years.
- Tony Livesey (born 1964), British journalist and broadcaster on BBC Radio 5 Live
- Heather Hancock (born 1965), former senior civil servant, now Master of St John's College, Cambridge
- John Simm (born 1970), actor, director, and musician; played Sam Tyler in Life on Mars
- David Fishwick (born 1971), businessman, opened David Fishwick Minibus Sales and became the biggest minibus supplier in Britain
- Andrew Stephenson (born 1981), former politician, was MP for Pendle from 2010 until 2024.
- Natalie Gumede (born 1984), actress, played Kirsty Soames in the ITV soap opera, Coronation Street
- Hannah Hobley (born 1988), actress and classical singer; played Chantelle "Telle" Garvey in ITV's Benidorm.
- Jessica Forrest (born 1990), actress and writer, played Leanne Holiday in the British soap opera Hollyoaks
- Lily Fontaine, lead singer of indie rock band English Teacher

=== Sport ===
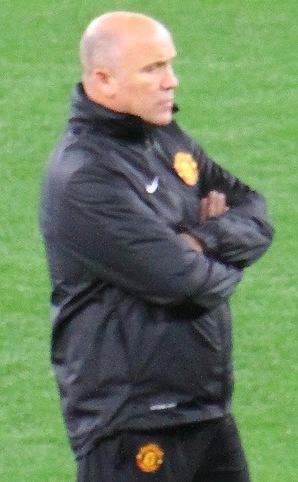
Mike Phelan, 2012

- Jim Collins (1923–1996), footballer, played 343 games, including 295 for Barrow
- Alan Wharton (1923–1993), England Test cricketer who played 482 First-class cricket matches for Lancashire and Leicestershire.
- Jeff Smith (born 1934), two-time Motocross World Champion (1964 – 1965) and nine-time British motocross champion.
- Ken Bracewell (born 1936), former footballer, played 242 games
- Brian Redman, (born 1937) race-car driver, won the 1974, '75 and '76 SCCA Formula 5000 series.
- Geoff Hall (1941–2009), played 48 First-class cricket matches for Somerset
- Dave Walker (1941-2015), footballer played 235 games including 197 for Southampton
- Kevin Hird (born 1955), footballer, played 396 games including 132 for Blackburn Rovers & 181 for Leeds United
- Mike Phelan (born 1962), footballer, played 485 games including 168 for Burnley and Assistant Manager at Manchester United under Sir Alex Ferguson
- Jonathan Broughton (born 1969), retired swimmer, took part in the 200 metre freestyle relay at the 1988 Summer Olympics
- Neil Hodgson (born 1973), former motorcycle racer and 2003 Superbike World Champion
- Steven Burke (born 1988), track and road cyclist, took part in the team pursuit at 2012 & 2016 Summer Olympics

== See also ==
- Listed buildings in Colne
- Talbot Street bomb-making haul, the largest ever discovery of domestic bomb-making equipment in the UK.
- Colne and Trawden Light Railway Company
