= Electoral history of Julian Castro =

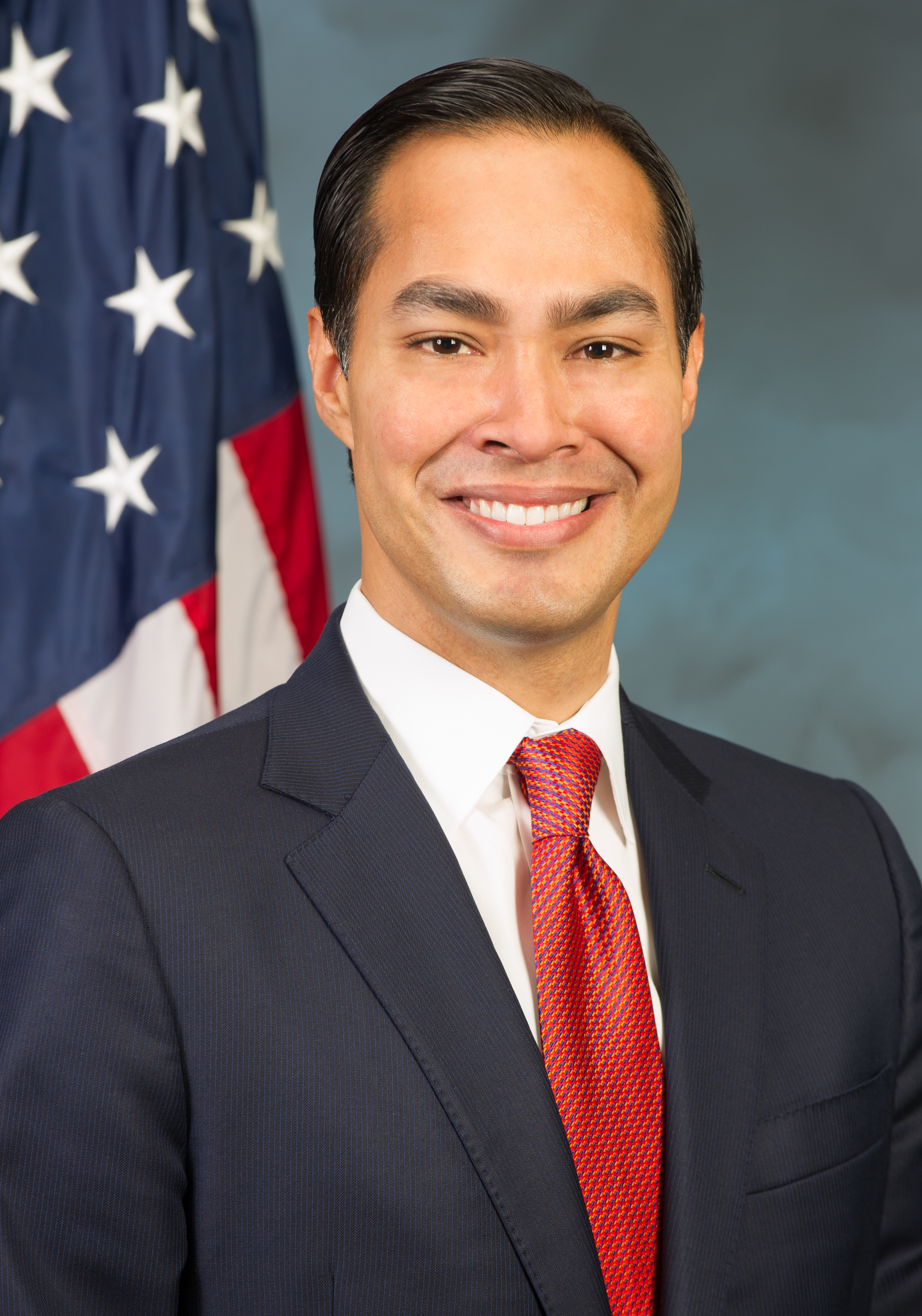
Julian Castro Official HUD Portrait

This is the electoral history of Julian Castro, who served as the 16th United States Secretary of Housing and Urban Development from 2014 to 2017. He previously served in the San Antonio City Council from 2001 to 2005 and as Mayor of San Antonio from 2009 to 2014. Castro sought the 2020 Democratic nomination for President, but ended his campaign before voting began.

== San Antonio City Council elections ==
=== 2001 ===
San Antonio City Council 7th district, 2001 election
Party	Candidate	Votes	%
Nonpartisan	Julian Castro	7,070	61.76%
Nonpartisan	Fred A. Rangel	1,479	12.92%
Nonpartisan	John Coleman	1,155	10.09%
Nonpartisan	John Carlos Garcia	848	7.41%
Nonpartisan	Raul F. Quiroga Jr.	596	5.21%
Nonpartisan	Michael A. Gonzalez	299	2.61%
Total votes		11,447	100%

=== 2003 ===
San Antonio City Council 7th district, 2003 election
Party	Candidate	Votes	%
Nonpartisan	Julian Castro (incumbent)	2,005	100.00%
Total votes		2,005	100%

== San Antonio Mayoral elections ==
=== 2005 ===
San Antonio Mayoral Election, 2005
Party	Candidate	Votes	%
Nonpartisan	Julian Castro	47,893	41.99%
Nonpartisan	Phil Hardberger	34,280	30.05%
Nonpartisan	Carroll Schubert	30,029	26.32%
Nonpartisan	Julie Iris Oldham	919	0.81%
Nonpartisan	Everett Caldwell	391	0.34%
Nonpartisan	Rhett R. Smith	289	0.25%
Nonpartisan	Michael Idrogo	270	0.24%
Total votes		115,194	100%

As no candidate reached a majority, a runoff election between the two leading candidates (Castro and Hardberger) was required.

San Antonio Mayoral Runoff Election, 2005
Party	Candidate	Votes	%
Nonpartisan	Phil Hardberger	66,830	51.47%
Nonpartisan	Julian Castro	63,001	48.53%
Total votes		129,991	100%

=== 2009 ===
San Antonio Mayoral Election, 2009
Party	Candidate	Votes	%
Nonpartisan	Julian Castro	42,745	56.23%
Nonpartisan	Trish DeBerry-Mejia	22,031	28.98%
Nonpartisan	Diane Cibrian	6,181	8.13%
Nonpartisan	Sheila D. McNeil	2,962	3.90%
Nonpartisan	Rhett R. Smith	715	0.94%
Nonpartisan	Lauro A. Bustamante	441	0.58%
Nonpartisan	Julie Iris Oldham	385	0.51%
Nonpartisan	Michael Idrogo	371	0.49%
Nonpartisan	Napoleon Madrid	188	0.25%
Total votes		76,019	100%

=== 2011 ===
San Antonio Mayoral Election, 2011
Party	Candidate	Votes	%
Nonpartisan	Julian Castro (incumbent)	34,309	81.44%
Nonpartisan	Will McLeod	2,846	6.76%
Nonpartisan	Rhett R. Smith	2,153	5.11%
Nonpartisan	James Rodriguez	1,675	3.98%
Nonpartisan	Michael Idrogo	1,145	2.72%
Total votes		42,128	100%

=== 2013 ===
San Antonio Mayoral Election, 2013
Party	Candidate	Votes	%
Nonpartisan	Julian Castro (incumbent)	29,449	66.51%
Nonpartisan	Rhett R. Smith	5,807	13.12%
Nonpartisan	Jesus G. Reyes	2,934	6.63%
Nonpartisan	Michael Idrogo	2,298	5.19%
Nonpartisan	Raymond Zavala	1,472	3.32%
Nonpartisan	Irma Rosas	1,461	3.30%
Nonpartisan	Sergio Falcon	857	1.94%
Total votes		44,278	100%

== 2014 Secretary of Housing and Urban Development confirmation ==
2014 United States Senate confirmation to be Secretary of HUD
July 9, 2014	Party			All votes
	Democratic	Republican	independent	All votes
Yea	51	18	2	71
Nay	0	26	0	26
Simple majority (49 of 97 votes) required – Nomination confirmed

== 2020 Democratic party presidential primaries ==
Despite ending his campaign before voting began, Castro still appeared on the ballot in over a dozen states, including his home state of Texas. Castro won 37,037 votes, including 16,688 in Texas.
