= David Bright (diver) =

Wreck diver

David A. Bright (June 29, 1957 – July 8, 2006) was an American underwater explorer and diver. He was the president of the Nautical Research Group, which he founded in 2003, and an avid contributor to documentaries on shipwrecks.

== Early life ==
Bright was born in Niagara Falls, New York in 1957. He was on his school's swimming team and one of his coaches asked if he would be interested in taking scuba lessons. He became a certified scuba diver at 13 years of age and started diving around the New York and Canadian areas. He received two bachelor's degrees in biology and German, and two years later got a masters in Physiology, all from Penn State.

== Diving career ==
After working for pharmaceutical companies, including Pfizer, Bright returned to diving full-time. He began searching famous wrecks like RMS Titanic, RMS Empress of Ireland, USS Monitor, and SS Andrea Doria. His findings helped him get into many documentaries about shipwrecks. He was a member of the Explorers Club, the Marine Technology Society, American Academy of Underwater Sciences, North American Society for Oceanic History, Maritime Archaeological and Historical Society and the Pennsylvania State University Eberly College of Science Alumni Board of Directors.

== Andrea Doria ==
Bright repeatedly dived on the SS Andrea Doria shipwreck, near Nantucket, to research the ship's demise. His first expedition to the wreck showed that the Stockholm had caused much more damage to the Doria than had been originally thought. He kept diving to what many considered the Mount Everest of diving, even after 13 other divers died exploring the wreck. On July 8, 2006, while diving to determine if any damage was caused to the keel of the ship, Bright suffered from decompression sickness and went into cardiac arrest. He was pronounced dead at Cape Cod Hospital.
