= Edward P. Morgan =

American journalist

- Born: Edward Paddock Morgan; June 23, 1910
- Died: January 27, 1993 (aged 82)
- Occupations: journalist, writer
- Spouse: Jane Stolle

Edward Paddock Morgan (June 23, 1910 – January 27, 1993) was an American journalist and writer who reported for newspapers, radio, and television media services including ABC, CBS networks, and the Public Broadcasting Service (PBS).

A native of Walla Walla, Washington, Morgan began his news career with The Seattle Star in 1932. He worked in print journalism for two decades, for United Press International, The Chicago Daily News, and Collier's Weekly before joining CBS as a radio and TV reporter.

From 1955 to 1967, Morgan broadcast an evening radio program of news and commentary, "Edward P. Morgan and the News," which won him the George Foster Peabody Award in 1956.

In 1956, Morgan was based in New York City and working for the ABC Radio Network. He broadcast a professional news report of the collision of the ocean liners SS Andrea Doria and MS Stockholm off the Massachusetts coast, not telling listeners that his 14-year-old daughter had been aboard the Andrea Doria and was believed to have been killed.

His daughter, Linda Morgan, was discovered alive the next day, having been catapulted to a deck of the Stockholm when its bow knifed into her cabin. Dubbed by media the "miracle girl", she had received only a broken arm. Morgan then made another broadcast emotionally describing the difference between reporting the news about strangers and how different it was with his own loved ones involved.

In 1960 Morgan received the Alfred I. duPont Award.

Morgan moved to ABC News in the early 1960s where, with Howard K. Smith, he anchored portions of ABC's coverage of the assassination of President John F. Kennedy and the 1964 political conventions. He retired as an ABC commentator and Newsday Syndicate columnist in 1975. Edward P. Morgan died January 27, 1993, at his home in McLean, Fairfax County, Virginia.

His first marriage in 1937 was to Jane Stolle. Their daughter Linda was born in 1942. In 1945, the marriage dissolved. He married his second wife Katherine Sage Sohier (née Burden) on July 18, 1960. Sohier had two daughters from her first marriage to Walter Denegre Sohier.

Media offices
Preceded by Bryson Rash	ABC News Chief White House Correspondent	Succeeded by John Edwards
