= Linda Morgan =

American survivor of passenger ship collision

Linda Morgan Cianfarra Hardberger

First Lady of San Antonio
- In role June 7, 2005 – June 1, 2009
- Preceded by: Anna Garza
- Succeeded by: Erica Castro

Personal details
- Born: 1942 (age 83–84) Mexico City, Mexico
- Spouse: Phil Hardberger (m. 1968)
- Children: 2
- Relatives: Edward P. Morgan (father)

Linda Morgan (born 1942), now known as Linda Hardberger, became known as the "miracle girl" following the collision of the SS Andrea Doria and the MS Stockholm in the North Atlantic Ocean on the foggy night of July 25, 1956.

== Background ==
Morgan was born in Mexico City, Mexico in 1942. On July 25, 1956 she was a 14-year-old passenger on the Andrea Doria along with her mother (Jane Cianfarra), a half-sister (Joan Cianfarra), and a stepfather (Camille Cianfarra). On the night of the collision, Morgan and Joan shared a cabin (52) which was adjacent to a cabin (54) shared by her mother and stepfather. Both Morgan and Joan were asleep in their cabin at the time of impact.

== Andrea Doria ==
=== Collision ===
When the SS Andrea Doria was struck broadside by the prow of the MS Stockholm, cabins 52 and 54 were directly in its line. Morgan was somehow lifted out of her bed and onto the Stockholm's crushed bow, landing safely behind a bulwark as the two ships scraped past each other before separating. In the ensuing confusion, a Stockholm crewman heard her crying for her mother in Spanish, which was unusual to hear on the Swedish ship. She was then taken to a cabin where another crewman (Bernabe Polanco Garcia) who spoke Spanish was able to translate from Morgan: "What happened? Where am I?" When he informed her that she was aboard the Stockholm, Morgan replied: "Impossible, I am a passenger on the Andrea Doria".

Morgan's half-sister and stepfather were not as lucky as Joan was swept into the sea despite their proximity, and Camille was crushed to death. Her mother Jane was badly injured, but was able to survive the collision after being trapped for hours in the wreckage. Joan and Camille were two of 46 passengers and crew who died in the impact areas on the two ships. After all the surviving passengers and crew were evacuated by several rescue ships (most notably the S.S. Île de France), the Andrea Doria capsized and sank the next morning. With ships of several nations transporting survivors, communication of news to the waiting families was difficult. Linda Morgan and her younger half-sister, Joan, were both listed among the missing passengers in early reports.

=== Aftermath ===
Linda's father, ABC Radio Network news commentator Edward P. Morgan, was based in New York City. On his daily broadcast, he reported the collision of the ocean liners, not telling his thousands of listeners that his daughter had been aboard the Andrea Doria and was believed to have been killed.

Linda, who suffered a broken arm, was quickly dubbed the "miracle girl" by the news media as the story of her survival and the circumstances spread. She returned to New York City aboard the crippled Stockholm, where she was reunited with her mother Jane Cianfarra, who had been severely injured in the cabin where her husband had died, and her father. Edward Morgan then made another broadcast less able to conceal his emotions, demonstrating the difference between reporting the news about strangers and his own loved ones.

Linda Morgan was admitted to St. Vincent's Hospital in New York, where her broken arm was placed in traction. Sister Loretta Bernard, administrator of the hospital, gave Polanco a Miraculous Medal of Our Lady. When Polanco, her Spanish-speaking crewman benefactor, was on a weekend leave from the Stockholm, he went to the hospital to pay a visit. Then Linda's father, who had also worked in Mexico, greeted him with a hearty embrace. "Hombre, hombre," said Mr. Morgan, "Man, man how can I ever thank you?"

== Later life ==
Morgan suffered from survivor's guilt, as her stepfather and younger half-sister had been killed and her mother badly injured.

She moved to San Antonio, Texas, in 1970. She served as a curator at the McNay Art Museum and is currently the curator of the Tobin Theatre Arts Fund.

Her husband since 1968, Phil Hardberger, served as Mayor of San Antonio from 2005 to 2009.
