= Phil Hardberger =

American politician & lawyer (born 1934)

Mayor of San Antonio
- In office June 7, 2005 – June 1, 2009
- Preceded by: Ed Garza
- Succeeded by: Julian Castro

Personal details
- Born: Phillip Duane Hardberger; July 27, 1934 (age 92) Morton, Texas, U.S.
- Party: Democratic
- Spouse: Linda Morgan (m. 1968)
- Children: 2
- Relatives: Tommy Lee Jones (former son-in-law)
- Education: Baylor University (BA); Columbia University (MS); Georgetown University (LLB)
- Profession: Judge; Attorney

Military service
- Allegiance: United States
- Branch/service: United States Air Force
- Years of service: 1955–1958
- Rank: Captain

Phillip Duane Hardberger (born July 27, 1934) is an American politician and lawyer who served as Mayor of San Antonio from 2005 to 2009. A Democrat, he was elected on a non-partisan ballot.

== Life and career ==
=== Early and personal life ===
After Baylor, Hardberger was a captain in the United States Air Force and piloted the B-47 bomber. He was the executive secretary of the Peace Corps during the administration of U.S. President John F. Kennedy. He was a special assistant to the director of the U.S. Office of Economic Opportunity under President Lyndon B. Johnson.

In 1968, he married the former Linda Morgan, who in 1956 survived the sinking of the SS Andrea Doria. He would then be appointed Associate Justice and then Chief Justice of the Fourth Court of Appeals. As chief justice, he presided over the Littleton v. Prange case, invalidating marriages in the court's jurisdiction if the transgender partner is of the same birth sex. It simultaneously also opened the option for some same-sex couples to marry as long as the two partners were the opposite sex at birth. He and Linda had two daughters, Amy and Kimberlea. His daughter Kimberlea was married to actor Tommy Lee Jones at one point.

=== Political career ===
Hardberger's decision to run for mayor in the fall of 2004 was somewhat of a surprise because no one without a city council background had been elected mayor of San Antonio in modern history. He defeated Councilman Julian Castro, his ultimate successor as mayor, in a runoff on June 7, 2005. Hardberger himself succeeded Ed Garza, who was prohibited by city statute from serving more than two two-year terms.

Hardberger was in office during the fall of 2005 when the New Orleans Saints were displaced as a result of Hurricane Katrina and set up their operations in San Antonio. The 2005 season was split between the Alamodome in San Antonio and LSU's Tiger Stadium in Baton Rouge. Various media reports in the San Antonio Express-News indicated the owner and government officials in San Antonio were working behind the scenes concerning a possible permanent relocation to San Antonio. Hardberger pushed a strong verbal campaign to pursue the Saints. Other officials, including then-Texas Governor Rick Perry, had indicated they would also support a relocation to San Antonio, including using funding to upgrade the Alamodome, or possibly build a new stadium.

It is disputed in some circles as to the amount of discussions that happened between Mayor Hardberger and the New Orleans Saints. According to the San Antonio Express-News, Mayor Hardberger encouraged Saints owner Tom Benson to sue the NFL and commissioner Paul Tagliabue to try to keep the team in San Antonio permanently. No lawsuit was ever filed. Hardberger hasn't given up hope on another professional sports team even though the Saints have returned to New Orleans when he said, "Sometimes dates do lead to marriage proposals. We don't have to be a one-franchise town." Hardberger went on to say,"I'm going to support the county judge on this Marlins thing," Hardberger says. "But I have not changed my mind about the NFL. Baseball is a great game. But there isn't any doubt in my mind that, if we're going to take on an additional professional franchise, the great majority of people here would like a football team."..."I am absolutely certain that we will wind up with an NFL team in the next few years. It is coming, and if it's not the Saints, it will be somebody else." At the time Hardberger was first elected the city had been in talks with Major League Soccer to bring a franchise to the city as part of the league's continued expansion plans. Hardberger put an end to the talks, stating "Goodbye. That's what I would tell MLS," contending that the deal did not make financial sense for San Antonio.

Hardberger was reelected in May 2007 and completed his term in May 2009. One of his final acts as Mayor was to garner support to change the city's mayoral term limits from two to four two-year terms. He garnered 77% of the vote during his reelection in 2007 and left the mayor's office at the end of his second term with an approval rating of 86%.

During his two terms in office he was instrumental in leading San Antonio's response to Katrina and Rita victims, growing San Antonio's park space with the acquisition of Voelcker Park and the new San Antonio River expansion, starting Haven for Hope as a new city facility for San Antonio's growing homeless population, and setting the city on the road to being recognized as a green city as a result of its Mission Verde initiative. He was responsible for redeveloping Main Plaza to restore the city's original downtown center of government and society (dating to Spanish territorial days) and for bringing on Sheryl Sculley as City Manager.

=== After mayorship ===
In December 2009, in recognition of the former mayor's leadership and foresight in championing quality of life projects, the City of San Antonio announced it was changing the name of Voelcker Park to Phil Hardberger Park.

In January 2010, Hardberger became a shareholder at Cox Smith, the largest law firm in San Antonio and one of the leading business law firms in Texas. He supports the firm's Litigation, Appellate, Public Law and Economic Development practices, and is actively involved in the firm's external affairs and community relations. Hardberger said he plans to continue working on issues surrounding the city's River Walk expansion, development of the Bexar County Performing Arts Center and completion of Phil Hardberger Park off Blanco Road.

As a former mayor, but not a registered lobbyist, Hardberger in 2017 advocated successfully for Lake Assault Boats of Superior, Wisconsin, to obtain a $6.2 million contract to build sightseeing boats for the San Antonio River Walk. He was retained as an attorney for the Chicago-area firm in December 2016.

Hardberger's role in representing Lake Assault Boats brought him into conflict with Mayor Ivy Taylor, who claimed a conflict of interest "tainted beyond redemption" in the selection of the company. One of Taylor's mayoral opponents, city council member Ron Nirenberg, however, charged her with "changing the rules in the middle of the process to rig the outcome." Taylor had favored retention of the local contract company, Rio San Antonio Cruises.

Political offices
Preceded by Ed Garza	Mayor of San Antonio, Texas; 2005-2009	Succeeded by Julian Castro
