= SS Andrea Doria =

Italian ocean liner that sank in 1956

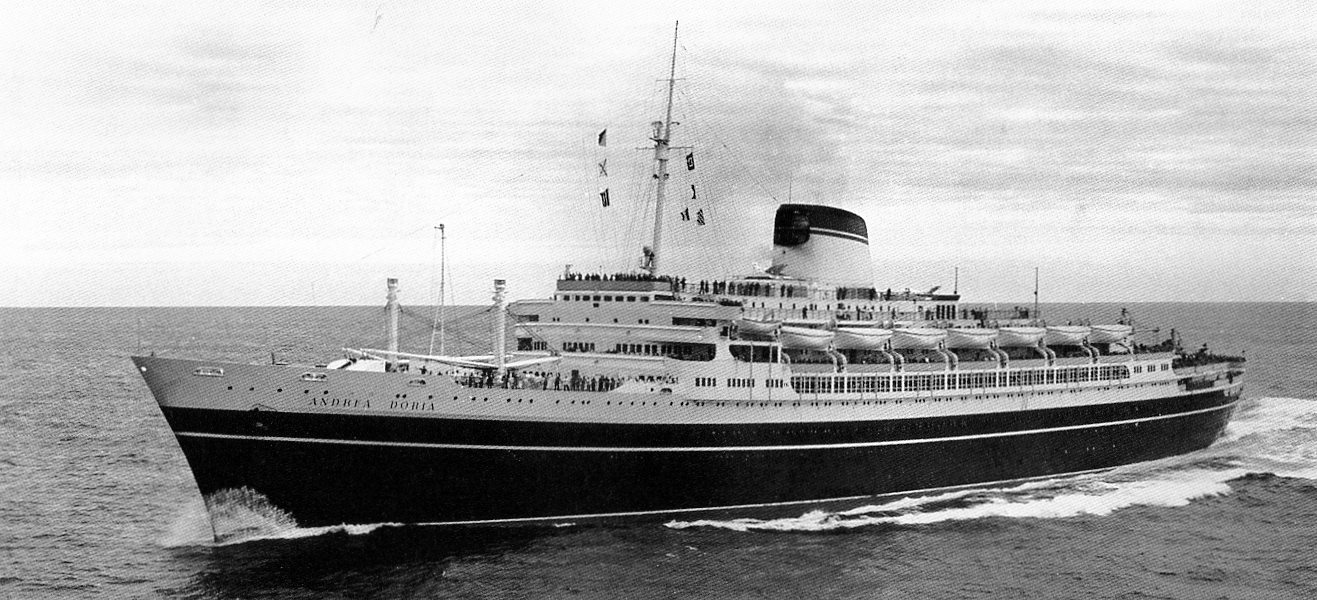
- Andrea Doria at sea, 1953

History

Italy
- Name: Andrea Doria
- Namesake: Andrea Doria
- Owner: Italian Line
- Operator: Italia di Navigazione S.p.A.
- Port of registry: Genoa, Italy
- Route: Genoa–New York City
- Builder: Ansaldo Shipyards, Genoa, Italy
- Yard number: 918
- Laid down: 9 February 1950
- Launched: 16 June 1951
- Acquired: 1953
- Maiden voyage: 14 January 1953
- In service: 14 January 1953
- Out of service: 26 July 1956
- Fate: Sank 26 July 1956 after collision

General characteristics
- Class & type: Andrea Doria-class ocean liner
- Tonnage: 29,083 GRT
- Length: 213.80 m (701 ft 5 in)
- Beam: 27.50 m (90 ft 3 in)
- Draft: 9.1 m (30 ft)
- Decks: 10
- Installed power: Steam turbines
- Propulsion: Twin propellers
- Speed: 23 knots (43 km/h; 26 mph)
- Capacity: 1,241 passengers
- Crew: 560

SS Andrea Doria (pronounced [anˈdrɛːa ˈdɔːrja]) was a transatlantic ocean liner of the Italian Line (Società di navigazione Italia), put into service in 1953. She is widely known from the extensive media coverage of her sinking on July 26, 1956, which included the rescue of 1,660 of her 1,706 passengers and crew.

Named after the 16th-century Genoese admiral Andrea Doria, the ship had a gross register tonnage of 29,100 and a capacity of about 1,200 passengers and 500 crew. Of all Italy's ships at the time, Andrea Doria was the largest, fastest and supposedly safest. Launched on 16 June 1951, she was home-ported at Genoa, and began her maiden voyage on 14 January 1953.

On 25 July 1956, the New York City–bound vessel was approaching the coast of Nantucket, Massachusetts, United States. There was thick fog and when Andrea Doria finally noticed the eastbound passenger liner Stockholm of the Swedish American Line, they were already too close to each other and on a collision course. Struck on her starboard side, the top-heavy Andrea Doria immediately started to list severely and take on water, which left half of her lifeboats unusable. The consequent shortage of lifeboats could have resulted in significant loss of life, but the ship stayed afloat for over 11 hours after the collision. The calm, appropriate behavior of the crew, together with improvements in communications, and the rapid response of other ships, averted a disaster similar in scale to that of Titanic in 1912. While 1,660 passengers and crew were rescued and survived, 46 people on the ship died as a direct consequence of the collision. The evacuated luxury liner capsized and sank the following morning. This accident remains the worst maritime disaster to occur in United States waters since the capsizing of Eastland at Chicago in 1915.

While the rescue efforts for both ships were successful, the cause of the collision, culpability, and the loss of Andrea Doria generated much continued interest in the media and many lawsuits. No determination of cause was ever formally published, largely due to a confidential out-of-court settlement agreement between the two shipping companies signed during hearings immediately after the disaster.

== History ==
=== Features ===
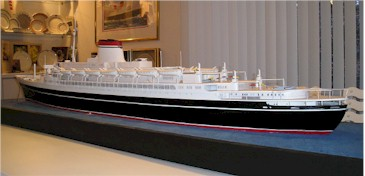
A model of Andrea Doria

Designed by Italian architect Giulio Minoletti, Andrea Doria had a length of 212 metres (695 ft 6 in), a beam of 27 metres (88 ft 7 in), and a gross register tonnage of 29,100. The propulsion system consisted of steam turbines attached to twin screws, enabling the ship to achieve a service speed of 23 knots (43 km/h; 26 mph), with a top speed of 26 knots (48 km/h; 30 mph). She was neither the largest vessel nor the fastest of her day – those distinctions went to the 83,673 GRT RMS Queen Elizabeth and 38.32 knots (70.97 km/h; 44.10 mph) SS United States; instead, her forte was luxury.

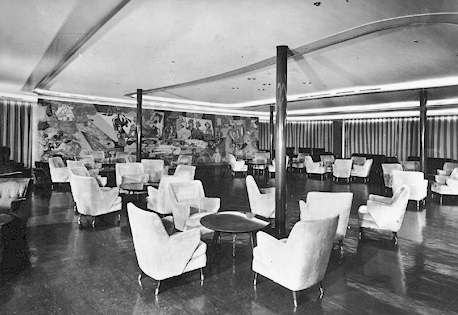
Ball Room

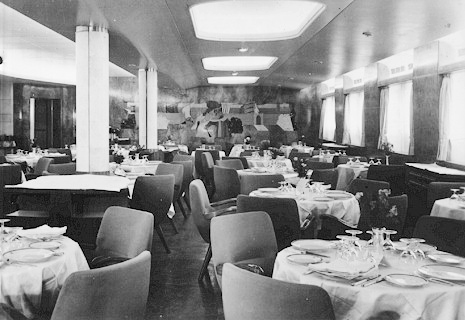
Dining Room

First class facilities

When fully booked, the ship was capable of accommodating 1,241 passengers; 218 in first class, 320 in cabin class, and 703 in tourist class. As was the rule aboard transatlantic passenger liners, each passenger class was strictly segregated to specific parts of the ship. First class accommodations were located amidships on the upper decks, cabin class accommodations were located just abaft of first class, and tourist class accommodations were divided between the forward and aft ends and were connected by corridors that ran the full length of the ship. Each class had its own separate dining room, lounges, and social halls, designated areas of open deck space and enclosed promenades, and even their own outdoor swimming pools with verandas. A crew of 563 was aboard. Over $1 million was spent on artwork and the decor of the cabins and public rooms, including a life-sized statue of Admiral Doria.

=== Safety and seaworthiness ===
Andrea Doria was built with a double hull divided into 11 watertight compartments. Any two of these could be filled with water without endangering the ship's safety. She was equipped with the latest early-warning radar, and carried sixteen steel lifeboats, eight on each side, enough by regulation to accommodate all passengers and crew. These came in three designs; two 58-person launches for emergency use, two 70-person motorboats with inboard radio transmitters, and 12 146-person hand-propelled rowboats.

However, despite its technological advantages, the ship had serious flaws relating to its seaworthiness and safety. Model testing during the design phase predicted she would develop a huge list when hit by any significant force. This was proven during her maiden voyage, when the vessel listed 28° after being hit by a large rogue wave off Nantucket. Her tendency to list was aggravated when her fuel tanks were nearly empty, which was usually at the end of a voyage.

This stability issue became a focus of the investigation after the sinking, as it was a factor in both the capsizing and the crew's inability to lower the port-side lifeboats. The bulkheads of the watertight compartments extended only up to the top of A Deck, and a list greater than 20° allowed water from a flooded watertight compartment to pass over its top into adjacent compartments. In addition, the design parameters allowed the lowering of the lifeboats at a maximum 15° list. Beyond this limit, up to half of the lifeboats could not be deployed.

=== Construction ===
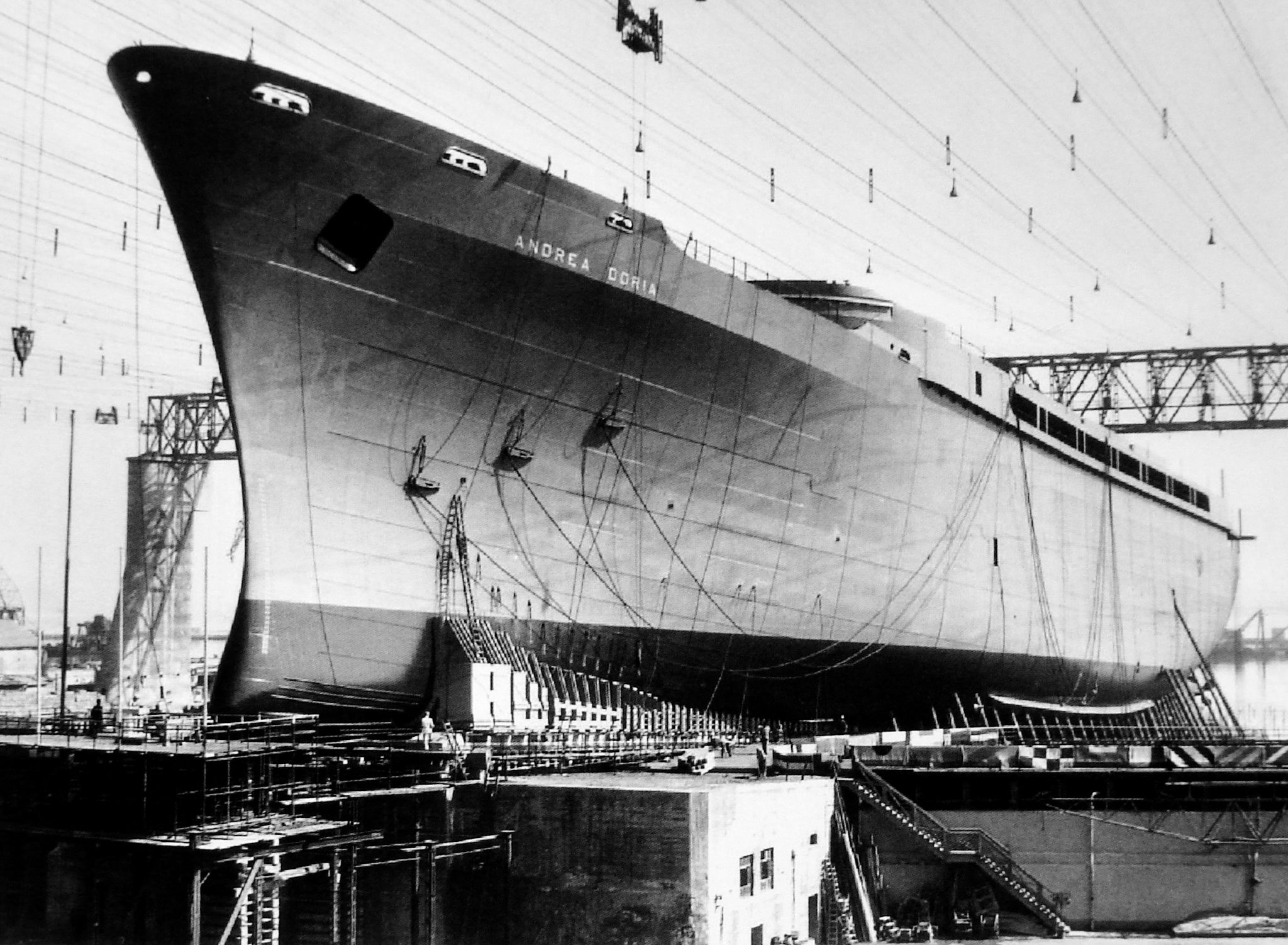
Andrea Doria under construction at Genoa in June 1951

At the end of World War II, Italy was struggling with a collapsed economy. It had lost half its merchant fleet through wartime destruction and reparations awarded to various Allied forces. The losses included the bombing and sinking of Rex, a former Blue Riband holder for her record transatlantic crossing. To show the world that the country had recovered from the war, and to reestablish the nation's pride, the Italian Line commissioned two new vessels of similar design in the early 1950s. The first was to be named Andrea Doria, after a famed 16th-century Genoese admiral Andrea Doria, the second Cristoforo Colombo after explorer Christopher Columbus.

These ships were intended to deliver express service on the Italian Line's "Sunny Southern Route" between Genoa and New York, stopping only at Cannes, Naples, and Gibraltar. Three slower prewar vessels, Saturnia, Vulcania and Conte Biancamano, among the handful of dowagers to survive the conflict, would follow a meandering route that included additional stops at Azores, Lisbon, Barcelona, and Palermo.

Construction of Andrea Doria started at Yard No. 918 at Ansaldo Shipyard in Genoa. On 9 February 1950, the ship's keel was laid on the No. 1 slipway, and on 16 June 1951, Andrea Doria was launched. During the ceremony, the ship's hull was blessed by Giuseppe Siri, Cardinal Archbishop of Genoa, and christened by Mrs. Giuseppina Saragat, wife of the former Minister of the Merchant Marine Giuseppe Saragat.

=== Maiden voyage ===
Initially, Andrea Doria had been scheduled to depart Genoa on her maiden voyage on 14 December 1952, but amid reports of machinery problems during sea trials, the departure was delayed to 14 January 1953. Following the Italian Line's advertised route, she collected 794 passengers (152 First Class, 157 Cabin Class, 485 Tourist Class) before heading into the open Atlantic for New York. During the voyage she encountered heavy storms on the final approach to New York, listing a full 28° after being hit by a particularly large wave. She arrived on 23 January and received a welcoming delegation that included New York Mayor Vincent R. Impellitteri.

== Final voyage ==
=== Outbound ===
Location of the collision

The 51st westbound crossing of Andrea Doria to New York began as a typical run on the North Atlantic. Her most recent eastbound crossing from New York had concluded on 14 July 1956, and after a three-day turnaround, she was scheduled to be outbound from Genoa on Tuesday, 17 July. On this run, she was booked to roughly 90% of her total passenger capacity, with 1,134 passengers travelling aboard: 190 in first class, 267 in cabin class and 677 in tourist class. Combined with a crew of 572, a total of 1,706 persons would sail aboard her to the United States.

On the morning of 17 July, Andrea Doria began to take on her first passengers at 8 a.m. A total of 277 embarked there: 49 first class, 72 cabin class and 156 tourist class. Among those traveling in first class were Hungarian ballet dancers Istvan Rabovsky and Nora Kovach, who had defected from the Soviet bloc to the United States just three years earlier. The ship departed at 11 a.m. on the first leg of her journey.

She arrived at Cannes on the French Riviera mid-afternoon that same day. An additional 48 passengers boarded there: 30 first class, 15 cabin class, and 3 tourist class. Among them was a Hollywood actress who would become one of Andrea Doria's most famous passengers, Ruth Roman, travelling with her three-year-old son Richard. The famous songwriter Mike Stoller was aboard as well. From Cannes Andrea Doria sailed 400 nautical miles (740 km; 460 mi) southeast to Naples, arriving the following morning. A total of 744 came aboard there: 85 in first class, 161 in cabin class, and 498 in tourist class. Most of the latter were emigrants from impoverished regions of southern Italy on their way to new lives in North America. She departed just after 6 p.m., arriving two days later off Gibraltar. A total of 65 passengers boarded: 26 first class, 19 cabin class, 20 tourist class, before she set out for New York.

On 25 July, just before noon, the passenger liner Stockholm of the Swedish American Line departed New York Harbor on her 103rd eastbound crossing across the Atlantic, headed to her home port of Gothenburg, Sweden. At 12,165 tons and 160 metres (525 ft) in length, roughly half the size of Andrea Doria, Stockholm was the smallest passenger liner on the North Atlantic run during the 1950s. Completed in 1948, she was of a much more practical design than Andrea Doria. Originally built to accommodate only 395 passengers in two classes, Stockholm was designed without the opulence of Andrea Doria because the Swedish-American Line was aware that the rapid growth of air travel would bring an end soon to the age of transatlantic passenger travel. However, they did not envision the massive surge in tourism fueled by the buoyant American economy that arose during the 1950s. As a result, the Swedish-American Line withdrew Stockholm from service in 1953 for an overhaul that included an addition to her superstructure to provide accommodations for an additional 153 passengers, increasing her capacity to 548. This proved successful, as by 1956 Stockholm had gained a worthy reputation on the North Atlantic.

Stockholm left New York booked almost to capacity, with 534 passengers and a crew of 208. She was commanded by Captain Harry Gunnar Nordenson, though Third Officer Johan-Ernst Carstens-Johannsen was on duty on the bridge at the time of the accident. This was his first time alone on the bridge of a ship, and he had been up since 06:00 that morning supervising baggage-loading and passenger-boarding in New York.

=== Collision course ===
To save time, the Stockholm set a homeward course south of the Nantucket Lightship and twenty miles (32 km) north of the recommended eastbound course for ships leaving the United States, placing Stockholm directly in the path of inbound westward traffic, a violation of the 1953 North Atlantic Track Agreement to which the Swedish American Line was a signatory. Cruising under clear skies, Stockholm's speed was approximately 18 knots (33 km/h; 21 mph) in visibility Carstens-Johannsen estimated to be six nautical miles (11 km; 6.9 mi).

The waters of the North Atlantic south of Nantucket Island are frequently the site of intermittent fog, as the cold Labrador Current encounters the Gulf Stream. As Stockholm and Andrea Doria were approaching each other head-on in the heavily used shipping corridor, the westbound Italian liner had been traveling in a heavy fog bank for hours. The captain had reduced speed slightly from 23.0 to 21.8 knots (42.6 to 40.4 km/h; 26.5 to 25.1 mph), activated the ship's fog-warning whistle, and had closed the watertight doors, all customary precautions while sailing in such conditions. However, the eastbound Stockholm had yet to enter the bank's western edge, and was seemingly unaware either of it or Andrea Doria's movement within it.

As the two ships approached each other in failing light at a combined speed of 40 knots (74 km/h; 46 mph), each was aware of the presence of another ship only through radar. Compounding this, they apparently misinterpreted each other's course, and made no initial radio communication.

The original inquiry established that in the critical minutes before the collision, Andrea Doria gradually steered south, to her left, attempting a starboard-to-starboard passing, while Stockholm also turned about 20° southward, to its right, an action intended to widen the clearance of a port-to-port passing, but instead put the two vessels on a direct collision course. As a result of the extremely thick fog that enveloped Andrea Doria as the ships approached each other, the two were quite close by the time visual contact was established. By then, the crews realized that they were headed straight into one another; in spite of their last-minute evasion maneuvers they could not avoid ramming.

In the last moments before impact, Stockholm turned hard to starboard (right) and was in the process of reversing her propellers, attempting to stop. Andrea Doria, remaining at her cruising speed of almost 22 knots (41 km/h; 25 mph) engaged in a hard turn to port (left), her captain hoping to outrun the collision. Around 11:10 p.m., the two ships collided, with Stockholm T-boning the starboard side of Andrea Doria.

=== Impact and penetration ===
Andrea Doria and Stockholm collided at almost a 90° angle. Stockholm's bow, heavily reinforced for operations in the icy North Atlantic, pierced Andrea Doria's starboard side about one-third of her length from the bow, under the ship's bridge. It penetrated the hull to a depth of nearly 40 feet (12 m), and the keel. Below the waterline, five fuel tanks on Andrea Doria's starboard side were torn open, and they filled with thousands of tons of seawater. Meanwhile, air was trapped in the five empty tanks on the port side, causing them to float more readily, contributing to a severe list.

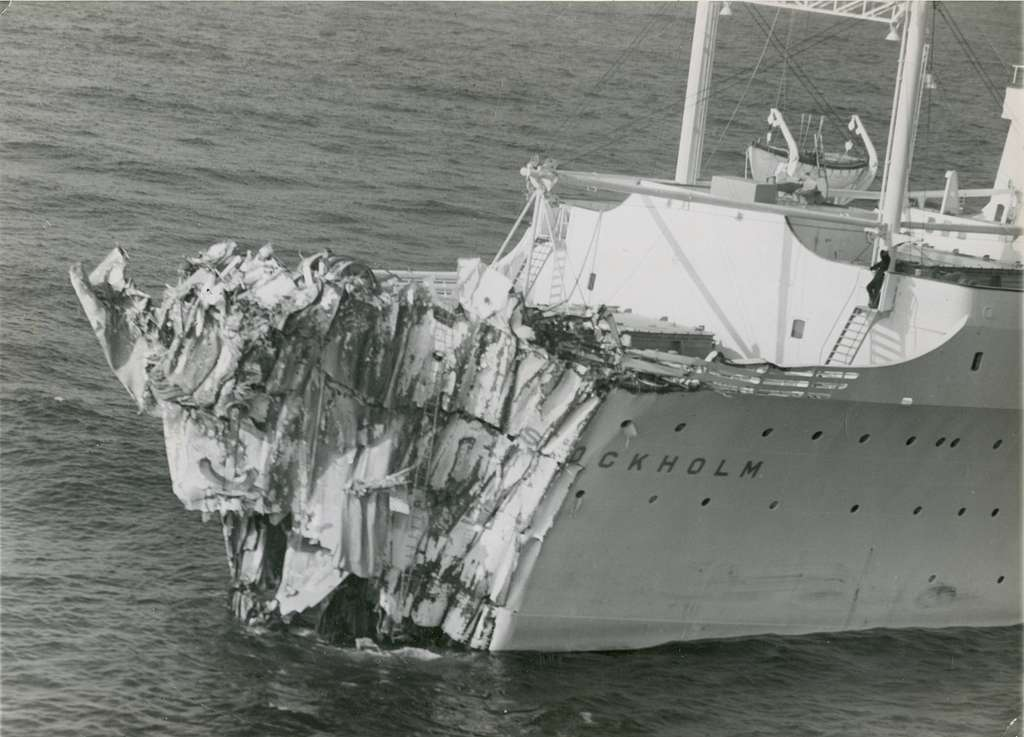
Stockholm with severely damaged bow

Andrea Doria was designed with her hull divided into 11 watertight compartments, separated by steel bulkheads that ran across the width of her hull, rising from the bottom of the ship's hull up to A Deck. The only openings in the bulkheads were on the bottom deck, where watertight doors were installed for use by the engine crew and could be easily closed in an emergency. Her design specified that if any two adjacent watertight compartments were breached, she could remain afloat. In addition, following the rules and guidelines set by the International Conference for Safety of Life at Sea of 1948, Andrea Doria was designed to handle a list, even under the worst imaginable circumstances, but not one greater than 15°. However, the combination of the five flooded tanks on one side and the five empty tanks on the other left her with a list that, within a few minutes of the collision, exceeded 20°. While the collision itself penetrated only one of Andrea Doria's watertight compartments, the severe list would gradually pull the tops of the bulkheads along the starboard side below the level of the water, allowing seawater to flow down corridors, down stairwells, and any other way it could find into the next compartment in line. The collision had also torn into an access tunnel running from the generator room, which was located in the compartment directly aft of where the collision had happened, to a small room at the forward end of the tank compartment containing the controls for the tank pumps. But a fatal flaw in Andrea Doria's design existed, as at the point where the tunnel went through the bulkhead separating the two compartments, no watertight door was present. This allowed the generator room to flood rapidly, contributing to not only an increase in flooding, but a loss of electricity.

Andrea Doria sent this SOS call:

SOS DE ICEH [this is Andrea Doria] SOS HERE AT 0320 GMT LAT. 40.30 N 69.53 W NEED IMMEDIATE ASSISTANCE

It was only through the initial radio distress calls sent out by each ship that they learned one-another's identity. Soon afterward, the messages were received by numerous radio and Coast Guard stations along the New England coast, and the world soon became aware that two large ocean liners had collided.

=== Assessing damage and imminent danger ===
Immediately after the collision, Andrea Doria began to take on water and started to list severely to starboard. Within minutes, the list was at least 18°. After the ships separated, Captain Calamai quickly brought the engine controls to "all stop". One of the watertight doors to the engine room may have been missing, though this issue was later determined to be moot. Much more importantly, however, crucial stability was lost by the earlier failure during routine operations to ballast the mostly empty fuel tanks with seawater as they were emptied, as the builders had specified (which, however, makes refueling more costly). Owing to the immediate rush of seawater flooding the starboard tanks, and because the port tanks had emptied during the crossing, the list was greater than would otherwise have been the case.

In the engine room, engineers attempted to pump water out of the flooding starboard tanks, but to no avail. Only a small amount of fuel remained, and the intakes to pump seawater into the port tanks were now high out of the water, making any attempt to level the ship futile. As the list increased over the next few minutes to 20° or more, Calamai realized that his ship was doomed.

Aboard Stockholm, roughly 30 feet (10 m) of her bow had been crushed and torn away. Initially, the ship was dangerously down by the bow, but emptying the freshwater tanks soon raised the bow to within four inches (10 cm) of normal. A quick survey determined that the major damage did not extend aft beyond the bulkhead between the first and second watertight compartments. In spite of her condition, the ship was soon determined to be stable and in no imminent danger of sinking.

=== Rescue operations ===
On Andrea Doria, the decision to abandon ship was made within 30 minutes of impact. A sufficient number of lifeboats for all of the passengers and crew was split evenly on each side of the Boat Deck. Procedures called for lowering the lifeboats until they could be secured alongside the glass-enclosed Promenade Deck one level below, allowing evacuees to climb out of windows directly into the boats. However, it was soon determined that the port side lifeboats were unlaunchable due to the severe list, which left them high in the air: lowering them would cause them to collide with the exposed hull, and cause them to tip. Compounding things, the list also complicated normal lifeboat procedures on the starboard side, making it necessary to lower the boats empty and somehow get evacuees to board them at water level. This was eventually accomplished through ropes and Jacob's ladders. In fear of causing a panic and stampeding of the starboard lifeboats, Captain Calamai decided against giving the order to abandon ship until help arrived. In the meantime, Second Officer Guido Badano made announcements over the loudspeaker system instructing passengers to put on their lifebelts and go to their designated muster stations.

Andrea Doria's radios had limited range, so her distress message making it clear that additional lifeboats were urgently needed was relayed to other ships that could receive it. The United States Coast Guard from New York City also coordinated on land.

In this case being in a busy shipping lane proved helpful to Andrea Doria. The first ship to respond to her distress call was the 120-metre (390 ft) freighter Cape Ann of the United Fruit Company, which was returning to the United States after a trip to Bremerhaven, Germany. Upon receiving the message from the stricken Andrea Doria, Captain Joseph Boyd immediately set a course for her. With a crew of 44 aboard and only two 40-person lifeboats, the assistance Cape Ann could offer was limited, but within minutes, she was joined by other ships heeding the distress call. The United States Navy transport USNS Private William H. Thomas, en route to New York from Livorno, Italy, with 214 troops and dependents also responded to the signal and made immediate progress towards the site. Her captain, John Shea, was placed in charge of the rescue operation by the US Navy and readily ordered his crew to prepare their eight usable lifeboats. Also joining the rescue was the United States Navy destroyer escort USS Edward H. Allen.

Forty-four nautical miles (81 km; 51 mi) east of the collision site, the French Line's Île de France was eastbound from New York en route to her home port of Le Havre, with 940 passengers and a crew of 826 aboard. At 44,500 tons and 241 metres (791 ft) in length, the 30-year-old luxury liner was among the largest and fastest passenger liners on the North Atlantic run. On that voyage, having left New York the same day as Stockholm, she was under the command of Captain Raoul de Beaudéan, a well-respected veteran of the seas who had served the French Line for 35 years. Upon hearing of the collision and the distress call, de Beaudéan was at first skeptical of the thought of a modern ship like Andrea Doria actually foundering, and knew that if he did steer back to the collision site only to find that Île de France was not needed, it would mean having to return to New York to refuel and delay her passengers, which could have been a financial blow to the French Line. At the least he needed to contact Andrea Doria to size up the situation. His attempt was unsuccessful, but after communicating with Stockholm, Cape Ann, and Thomas, he grasped that the lives of over 1,600 people were at risk, turned Île de France around, and set a direct course for Andrea Doria.

Indeed, help was direly needed, as in spite of the efforts made aboard Andrea Doria to launch her starboard lifeboats many left only partially loaded, carrying in all only 200 panicked crewmen and very few passengers.

While other ships nearby were en route, Captain Nordenson of Stockholm determined that his ship was not in any imminent danger of sinking, and, after assuring his mostly sleeping passengers of their safety, sent some of his lifeboats to aid in the rescue. In the first hours many survivors transported by lifeboats from both ships were taken aboard Stockholm.

As he approached the accident scene less than three hours after the collision, Captain de Beaudéan of Île de France became concerned about navigating his huge ship safely among the two damaged liners, other responding vessels, lifeboats, and possibly even people in the water. Then, just as she arrived, the fog lifted, and he was able to position his ship in such a way that the starboard side of Andrea Doria was somewhat sheltered from wind and waves. He ordered all exterior lights of Île de France to be turned on. The sight of the illuminated Île de France was a great emotional relief to everyone involved.

Île de France managed to rescue the bulk of the remaining passengers by shuttling its ten lifeboats back and forth to Andrea Doria, receiving lifeboat loads from those of the other ships already at the scene, and any of Andrea Doria's starboard boats left. Some passengers on Île de France gave up their cabins to grateful survivors. Many other acts of kindness were reported.

In all, 1,663 passengers and crew had been rescued from Andrea Doria. The badly damaged Stockholm, through the use of both her own lifeboats and those from the stricken Andrea Doria, took on a total of 545 survivors, of whom 234 were crew members from Andrea Doria who had left the vessel ahead of the passengers; 129 survivors had been rescued by Cape Ann, 159 by Private William H. Thomas, 77 by Edward H. Allen, including Captain Calamai and his officers. One American sailor, who slept through the entire collision and evacuation, was rescued from the abandoned, sinking liner by the tanker Robert E. Hopkins. Île de France played the largest role in the rescue, taking on 753 survivors.

Shortly after daybreak, a four-year-old Italian girl with head trauma and four seriously injured Stockholm crewmen were airlifted from that ship at the scene by helicopters sent by the Coast Guard and United States Air Force. A number of passengers and some crew from both vessels were hospitalized upon arrival in New York.

=== Andrea Doria capsizes and sinks ===
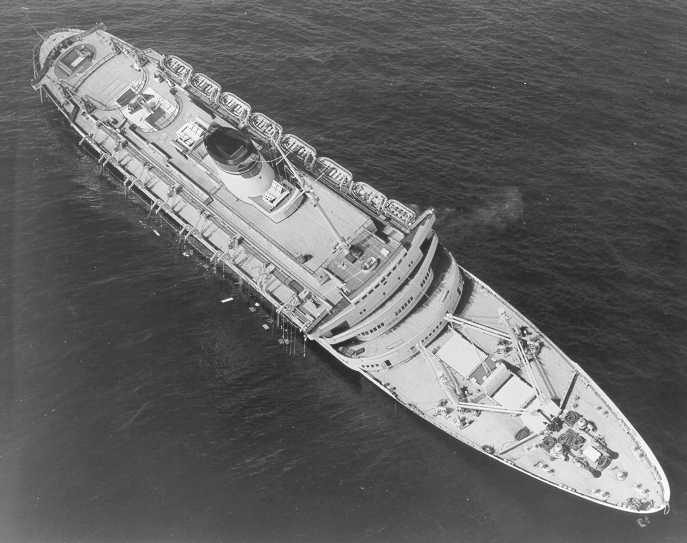
Andrea Doria shortly before sinking, the morning after the collision

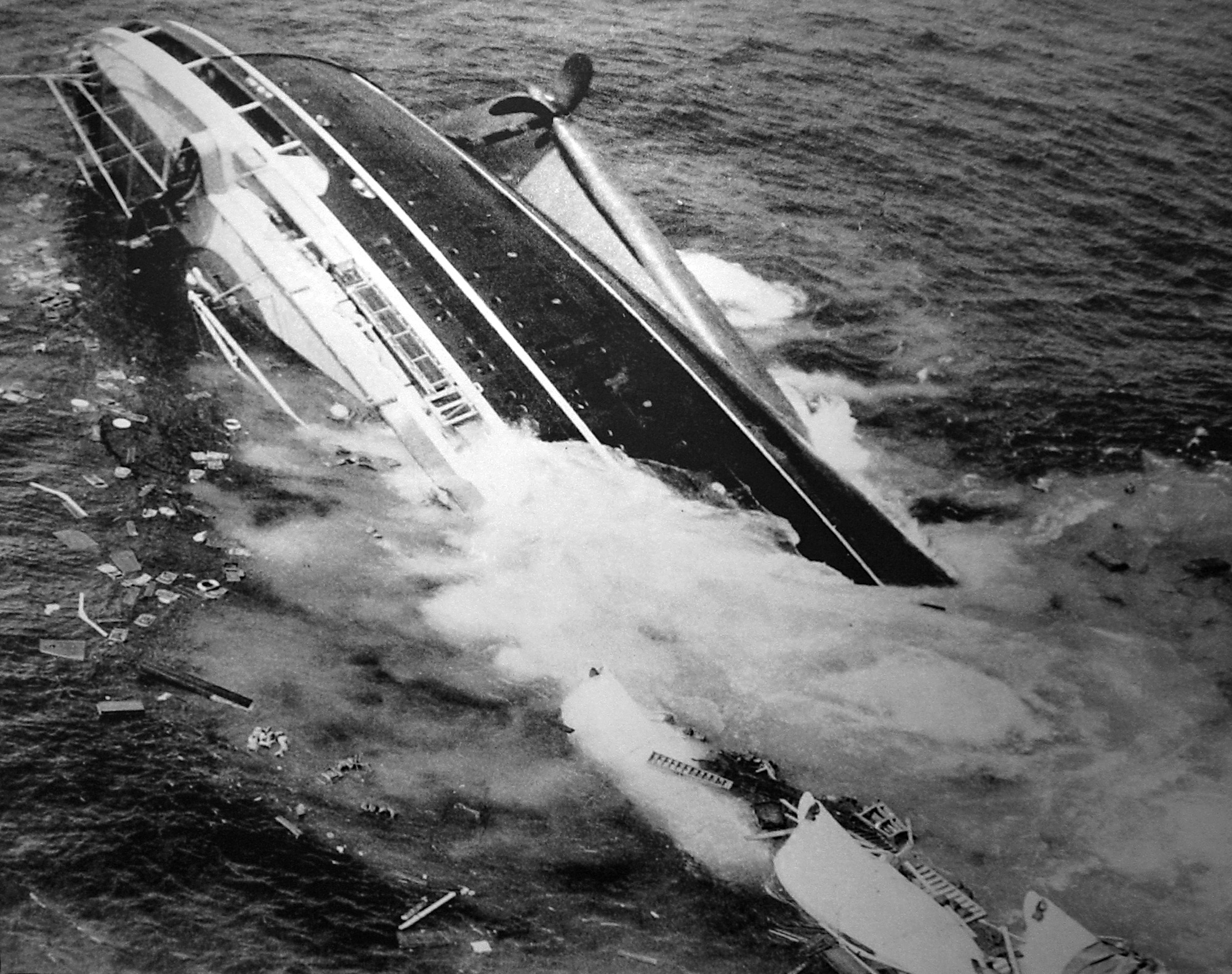
Harry A. Trask's Pulitzer Prize-winning photo of Andrea Doria minutes before she sank

Once the evacuation was complete, Captain Calamai of Andrea Doria shifted his attention to the possibility of towing the ship to shallow water. However, it was clear that it was doomed.

After all the survivors had been transferred onto various rescue ships bound for New York, Andrea Doria's remaining crew began to disembark – forced to abandon the ship. By 6:00 am, even Captain Calamai was in a rescue boat. The sinking began at 9:45 am and by 10:00 that morning the Andrea Doria's starboard side dipped into the ocean and the three swimming pools were seen refilling with water. As the bow slid under, the stern rose slightly, and the port propeller and shaft became visible. As the port side slipped below the waves, some of the unused lifeboats snapped free of their davits and floated upside-down in a row. It was recorded that Andrea Doria finally sank bow first 10 hours after the collision, at 10:09 am on 26 July 1956. The ship had drifted 1.58 nautical miles (2.93 km; 1.82 mi) from the point of the collision. Aerial photography of the stricken ocean liner capsizing and sinking won a Pulitzer Prize in 1957 for Harry A. Trask of the Boston Traveler newspaper.

=== Return to New York; families ===
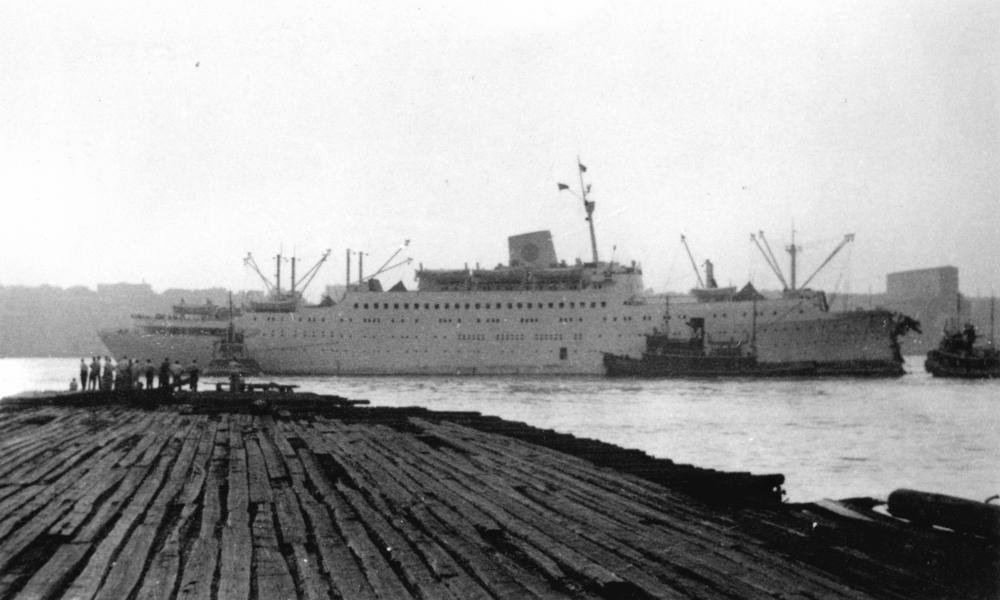
27 July 1956: After colliding with Andrea Doria, Stockholm, with severely damaged bow, arrives at New York.

Because of the scattering of Andrea Doria passengers and crew among the various rescue vessels, some families were separated during the collision and rescue. It was not clear who was where, and just who had survived, until all the ships with survivors arrived in New York. In all, six different ships participated in the rescue of the passengers and crew of Andrea Doria, including the heavily damaged Stockholm, which steamed back to New York under its own power with a United States Coast Guard escort after the others.

During the wait, New York City–based ABC Radio Network news commentator Edward P. Morgan broadcast a stirring account of the collision, not telling listeners that his 14-year-old daughter Linda Morgan had been aboard Andrea Doria and was feared dead. It was later revealed that she had been thrown from her bed when the two ships collided only to land on Stockholm's deck, suffering moderate but not life-threatening injuries and earning the epithet "miracle girl". The following night, after learning the good news, Edward P. Morgan's emotional broadcast became one of the more memorable in radio news history.

Among Andrea Doria's passengers were Hollywood actress Ruth Roman and her three-year-old son, Richard. In the 1950 film Three Secrets, Roman had portrayed a distraught mother waiting to learn whether or not her child had survived a plane crash. She and her son were separated from each other during the collision and evacuation. Rescued, Roman had to wait to learn her child's fate, which resulted in a media frenzy for photos as she waited at the pier in New York City for her child's safe arrival aboard one of the rescue ships. Actress Betsy Drake, who was married to movie star Cary Grant at the time, also escaped from the sinking liner, as did Philadelphia mayor Richardson Dilworth and songwriter Mike Stoller (of the team Leiber and Stoller).

Assisted by the American Red Cross and news photographers, the frantic parents of four-year-old Norma Di Sandro learned that their injured daughter had been airlifted from Stockholm to a hospital in Boston, where the previously unidentified little girl had undergone surgery for a fractured skull. They drove all night from New York to Boston, with police escorts provided to their convoy in Rhode Island and Massachusetts. When they arrived, the child was still unconscious and the doctors said all that could be done was wait to see if she woke up. The little girl never regained consciousness, and succumbed to her injuries.

Other families also had their hopes of seeing loved ones again dashed, especially those who were meeting members of several young families immigrating to the United States in hope of new lives.

The pier in New York where Stockholm was heading was packed with newsreel photographers and television crews. All the major department stores and shoe stores had booths set up to give the arriving survivors clothing and shoes. Not many of the newspeople spoke Italian, so confusion occurred when the survivors were asked to take off the clothing they were just given, to be photographed putting the clothes on. But after just a few minutes, everyone was clothed and had shoes to wear.

The sinking produced a footnote in automotive history, as it resulted in the loss of the Chrysler Norseman, an advanced "one-off" prototype car that had been built for Chrysler by Ghia in Italy. The Norseman had been announced as a major attraction of the 1957 auto show circuit. However, it had not been shown to the public prior to the disaster, and was lost, along with other cars in Andrea Doria's 50-car garage.

=== Casualties ===
A total of 51 lives were lost in the collision and sinking, consisting of 46 passengers from the Andrea Doria and five members of the crew of Stockholm. Of the 46 passengers lost aboard Andrea Doria, 43 died as a result of the collision. No remains were ever recovered of these casualties, and they are believed to remain entombed within the wreck.

The area of Andrea Doria's hull where Stockholm's bow penetrated encompassed five passenger decks. On the uppermost of these decks, the Upper Deck, at least eight first-class cabins were destroyed. In all, six first-class passengers lost their lives. In cabin 46, Colonel Walter Carlin had been in the bathroom brushing his teeth at the time of the collision and miraculously survived, while his wife Jeanette was killed. Later aboard Stockholm, crewmen searching the wreckage of the mangled bow sighted the remains of a woman matching Mrs. Carlin's description lodged in the wreckage, but before they could recover it, debris became dislodged and the body fell into the sea. In direct line of Stockholm's bow on the upper deck were cabins 52 and 54, which were occupied by Camille Cianfarra, a longtime foreign correspondent for The New York Times, his wife Jane, their 8-year-old daughter Joan and 14-year-old Linda Morgan, Jane's daughter from her previous marriage to American journalist Edward P. Morgan. Joan was killed instantly, while Camille died from severe injuries moments after the collision. Jane was seriously injured, but was rescued by some other passengers, among them Dr. Thure Peterson, who had been next door in cabin 56. He sustained only minor injuries, while his wife Martha was gravely wounded and was trapped along with Jane Cianfarra. After a long struggle to free her, largely on the part of her husband, Martha succumbed to her injuries a few hours after the collision. One deck below on the Foyer Deck, near the first-class entrance, Ferdinand Melly Thieriot, circulation director of The San Francisco Chronicle, along with his wife Frances (whose grandson is the actor Max Thieriot) were killed, as their suite was in direct line of Stockholm's bow. Their 13-year-old son Peter, who occupied a cabin further down the corridor, survived.

On the decks below, titled A, B and C Decks, the loss of life was greater, as it was the location of several sections of tourist-class cabins. On A Deck, eleven passengers, consisting of ten women and one elderly clergyman, were all killed. In Cabin 230, three women, Margaret Carola, Christina Covino and Amelia Iazzetta, were killed instantly. Carola had been on board with her elderly mother Rosa Carola, who had also been assigned a berth in the cabin but because she suffered from a variety of health problems, she had been in the ship's infirmary at the time of the collision and survived. Covino and Iazzetta were both sisters from New York who were returning from a visit to Italy. They were accompanied by Iazzetta's husband Benvenuto, who had been berthed in another cabin and survived.

In the next cabin forward, Cabin 228, four more women lost their lives. Among them was Laura Bremermann, a young mother of two who was returning home to Fort Worth, Texas after visiting her native Italy. Two days before the disaster Bremermann sent a telegram to her husband Floyd asking him to meet her in New York. When he arrived to find her missing he inquired with the Italian line, who initially reported she was not on the passenger list, which Bremermann refuted using the telegram from his wife as proof. On B Deck, Andrea Doria's 50-car garage was staved in by the bow of Stockholm, but on C Deck, the worst loss of life occurred. A total of 26 people were killed in the collision section there, mostly Italian immigrant families.

Among those killed in the collision on C Deck was opera singer Agnes Baratta, who at the time was a leading soprano of Milan's La Scala Opera House. She and her elderly mother Margherita Baratta had been en route to Redwood City, California, to visit her sister, after which Agnes had intended to audition for the San Francisco Opera House. Maria Theresina Imberlone, like the Barattas, was also bound for the San Francisco Bay Area, and was also killed in the collision. Imberlone's husband Giacomo and their 13-year-old son Giovanni, who shared another cabin, both survived.

Among the losses was that of Maria Sergio and her four children, 13-year-old Giuseppe, 10-year-old Anna Maria, 7-year-old Domenica, and 4-year-old Rocco, who occupied a cabin on the starboard side of C Deck that was in direct line of the collision. She was traveling aboard Andrea Doria with her children on her way to South Bend, Indiana, where her husband, Ross Sergio, and their 17-year-old son Anthony, were waiting for them. Anthony Sergio had in fact sailed to the United States from Italy aboard Andrea Doria the previous April. Also traveling with them were Maria's sister Margaret and her husband Paul Sergio, who also happened to be Ross Sergio's brother. Paul and Margaret had emigrated to the U.S. prior to the voyage and had returned to Italy for a visit and to accompany Maria and the children back to Indiana. Both Paul and Margaret survived the sinking, and for years after the disaster, Paul was haunted by the memory of his four-year-old nephew Rocco, the youngest of his brother's children, who just hours prior to the collision had asked if he could spend the night with his uncle.

Also lost in the collision section of C deck were Angelina Diana and her two youngest children, eight-year-old Biaggio and six-year-old Victoria. They had been en route to Hartford, Connecticut, where Angelina's husband Antonio and three of their older children were waiting. In a 2003 episode of the History Channel series Deep Sea Detectives featuring the story of Andrea Doria, show host and wreck diver John Chatterton met with Angelina Diana's son Gennaro and his daughter, whom he'd named Angelina, after her grandmother, and heard the story of how the disaster came to impact their family so profoundly. In speaking with Chatterton, Gennaro recalled excitedly waking up that morning and driving to New York with his father and two older sisters to meet the rest of their family, but as the survivors from Andrea Doria came ashore, they waited for five or six days until it was confirmed that Angelina, Biaggio and Victoria were among the 51 people who lost their lives in the disaster. Meanwhile, the younger Angelina explained how she grew up with a sense of great pride having been named after her grandmother, which was in turn mirrored with sadness in never having gotten to know her, or her aunt and uncle. She then gives Chatterton a green bottle containing a family jewel, asking him to place it on the wreck to honor their loved ones' memory, which Chatterton does later in the episode during a dive to the wrecksite.

In addition to the lives lost in the collision, three more of Andrea Doria's passengers died from injuries and ailments that occurred during and after the evacuation. Norma Di Sandro, a four-year-old Italian girl traveling in tourist class with her parents, Tullio and Filomena Di Sandro, was dropped on her head into a lifeboat by her panicked father. She was taken to Stockholm and subsequently airlifted to Brighton Marine Hospital in Boston, where she died from a fractured cranium without ever regaining consciousness. Carl Watres, a businessman from Manasquan, New Jersey, who was traveling in cabin class aboard Andrea Doria with his wife Lillian, died from a sudden heart attack while en route to New York aboard Stockholm. Angelina Grego, a 48-year-old, broke her back after falling into one of Ile de France's lifeboats. She was taken to St. Claire's Hospital in New York City, where she lingered in intense pain until her death six months later.

After the ships had separated, Stockholm crew members began to survey the damage. On the top deck of Stockholm, one of the crew came across Linda Morgan, who had been thrown from her bed on Andrea Doria as the two ships collided, and landed on Stockholm's deck, suffering moderate but not life-threatening injuries. Others were not as fortunate, as five of Stockholm's crew perished in the collision.

== Aftermath ==
Because the collision did not happen in the United States waters, and because neither the Andrea Doria nor the Stockholm were U.S. ships, the United States Coast Guard did not investigate the collision, nor did the United States Navy.

=== Litigation and determination of fault: 1956–1957 ===
Several months of hearings were held in New York City in the aftermath of the collision. Prominent maritime attorneys represented both the ships' owners. Dozens of attorneys represented victims and families of victims. Officers of both ship lines had testified, including the officers in charge of each ship at the time of the collision, with more scheduled to appear later until an out-of-court settlement was reached, and the hearings ended abruptly.

Both shipping lines contributed to a settlement fund for the victims. Each line absorbed its own damages. For the Swedish-American Line, damages were estimated at $2 million, half for repairs to Stockholm's bow, and half for lost business during repairs. The Italian Line sustained the loss of Andrea Doria's full value, estimated to be $30 million.

A U.S. Congressional hearing was also held, and provided some determinations, notably about the lack of ballasting specified by the builders during the fatal voyage and the resulting lack of seaworthiness of Andrea Doria after the collision. The Italian Line's chief lawyer was Morgan J. Burke Jr., who was awarded the Order of Merit of the Italian Republic for his efforts.

While heavy fog was given as the primary cause of the accident, and it is not disputed that intermittent and heavy fog are both frequent and challenging conditions for mariners in that part of the ocean, these other factors have been cited:

1. Andrea Doria's officers had not followed proper radar procedures or used the plotting equipment available in the chartroom adjacent to the bridge of their ship to plot and then calculate the course, position and speed of the other (approaching) ship. Thus, they failed to realize Stockholm's speed and course.
2. Andrea Doria had not followed the long-established rule that vessels approaching head-to-head both turn towards the right (to starboard). As Stockholm turned to starboard, Andrea Doria turned to port, closing the circle instead of opening it. Beyond a certain point, it became impossible to avoid a collision.
3. Captain Calamai of Andrea Doria was deliberately speeding in heavy fog, an admittedly common practice on passenger liners. The navigation rules required speed to be reduced during periods of limited visibility to a stopping distance within half the distance of visibility. As a practical matter, this would have meant reducing the speed of the ship to virtually zero in the dense fog.
4. Stockholm and Andrea Doria were experiencing different weather conditions immediately prior to the collision. The collision occurred in an area of the northern Atlantic Ocean off the coast of Massachusetts, where heavy and intermittent fog is common. Although Andrea Doria had been engulfed in the fog for several hours, Stockholm had only recently entered the bank and was still acclimating to atmospheric conditions. The officer in charge of Stockholm incorrectly assumed that his inability to see the other vessel was due to conditions other than fog, such as the other ship being a very small fishing vessel or a 'blacked-out' warship on maneuvers. He testified that he had no idea it was another passenger liner speeding through fog.
5. Andrea Doria's fuel tanks were half empty and not pumped with seawater ballast to stabilize the ship, in accordance with the Italian Line's procedures. This contributed to the pronounced list following the collision, the inability of the crew to pump water into the port fuel tanks to right the ship, and the inability to use the port lifeboats for the evacuation.
6. Also, a watertight door may have been missing between bulkheads near the engine room, which was thought to have contributed to Andrea Doria's problems.
7. Retired US naval engineer John C. Carrothers proposed that Stockholm's watch officer misread his radar thinking he was on a 15-nautical-mile (28 km) setting when in reality the radar may have been set for 5 nautical miles (9 km). Thus, he may have thought he was farther from Andrea Doria than he actually was. He failed to consult his captain as was required by regulation.

Both lines had an incentive to limit the public discussion of Andrea Doria's structural and stability problems. Stockholm's owners had another new ship, Gripsholm, under construction at Ansaldo Shipyard in Italy, the same yard that had built Andrea Doria. Andrea Doria's designers and engineers had been scheduled to testify, but the hearings were abruptly concluded before their testimony could be heard due to the settlement agreement.

=== Resulting reforms ===
The Andrea Doria–Stockholm collision led to several rule changes in the immediate years following the incident to avoid a recurrence. Since this was essentially a radar-assisted collision event, in which over-use was made of poorly handled technology, shipping lines were required to improve training on the use of radar equipment. Also, approaching ships were required to make radio contact with one another. Both ships saw each other on their radar systems and attempted to turn. Unfortunately, one of the radar systems was poorly designed, resulting in the collision. Marine craft today are required to turn to starboard (right) in a head-on situation.

=== Later investigations and study ===
Unanswered questions about the tragedy, and questions of cause and blame, have intrigued observers and haunted survivors for over 50 years. The fact that Andrea Doria and Stockholm were speeding in heavy fog (21.8 knots and 18.5 knots, respectively, at the collision) and questions about their seaworthiness arose at the time. Captain Calamai never assumed another command because the Italian Line feared bad publicity. However, largely because the out-of-court settlement agreement between the two shipping companies ended the fact-finding that was taking place in the hearings immediately after the disaster, no resolution of the cause(s) was ever formally accomplished. This has led to continued development of information and a search for greater understanding, aided by newer technologies in over half a century since the disaster.

Recent discoveries using computer animation and newer undersea diving technology have shed additional light on some aspects.

- Many years later, scientific study of the actions of the two crews indicated a possibility that the third mate on Stockholm misinterpreted his radar in the minutes prior to the impact. Recent studies and computer simulations carried out by Captain Robert J. Meurn of the United States Merchant Marine Academy and based on the findings of John C. Carrothers suggest Stockholm Third Officer Carstens-Johannsen misinterpreted radar data and badly overestimated the distance between the two ships. The poor design of the radar settings, coupled with unlighted range settings and a darkened bridge, makes this scenario possible. Some critics have suggested that a simple and available technology, a small light bulb on the radar set aboard Stockholm, might have averted the entire disaster. Instead, he may have unintentionally steered the Swedish ship into a collision with the Italian liner.
- Exploration of Andrea Doria's impact area revealed that Stockholm's bow had ripped a much larger gash in the critical area of the large fuel tanks and watertight compartments of the Italian liner than had been thought in 1956. The question of the "missing" watertight door, although still unanswered, was probably moot: Andrea Doria was doomed immediately after the collision.
- "...In maritime navigation, all collision avoidance manoeuvres are made based on the Collision Regulations COLREG. Although these rules have helped in managing the maritime traffic and also advised every vessel about the collision avoidance manoeuvres that need to be taken in every situation, they have not stopped accidents from happening (Demirel and Bayer, 2015; Lušić and Erceg, 2008). After a deep study of the COLREG a number of issues that can cause a hassle and confusion for the OOW (Officer On Watch) were identified (Belcher, 2002; Demirel and Bayer, 2015; Szlapczynski and Szlapczynska, 2015; Wylie, 1962)..." Extracted from Distance Comparative Review of Collision Avoidance Systems in Maritime and Aviation - Hesham Abdushkour, Osman Turan, Evangelos Boulougouris, Rafet Emek Kurt (University of Strathclyde, Glasgow, United Kingdom), a paper addressed to the transfer of TCAS (Traffic Collision Avoidance System) aerospace technology to maritime navigation.

== Wreck site ==
A painting of the decaying Andrea Doria circa 2005, with her superstructure gone and hull broken after 50 years of submersion in swift North Atlantic currents

Due to the luxurious appointments and initially good condition of the wreck, with the top of the wreck lying initially in 27 fathoms (49 m; 162 ft) of water, Andrea Doria has been a frequent target of treasure divers. It is commonly referred to as the "Mount Everest of scuba diving." The comparison to Mt. Everest originated after a July 1983 dive on Andrea Doria by Captain Alvin Golden during a CBS News-televised interview of the divers following their return from a dive expedition to the wreck aboard RV Wahoo. The depth, water temperature, and currents combine to put the wreck beyond the scope of recreational diving. The skills and equipment required to successfully execute this dive, such as use of mixed gases and staged decompression, put it in the realm of only the most experienced technical divers. The wreck is located near 40°29.408′N 69°51.046′W.

A week after Andrea Doria sank, divers Peter Gimbel and Joseph Fox managed to locate the wreck of the ship, and published pictures of the wreck in Life.

In 1968, film director Bruno Vailati, together with Stefano Carletti, Mimi Dies, Arnaldo Mattei, and Al Giddings (an experienced American diver), organized and directed the first Italian expedition to the wreck, producing the documentary titled Andrea Doria -74. The wreck was marked with a bronze plaque with the inscription: "We came here to work to make the dream come true and return the Andrea Doria to the light".

Peter Gimbel later conducted a number of salvage operations on the ship, including salvaging the first-class bank safe in 1981. Despite speculation that passengers had deposited many valuables, the safe, opened on live television in 1984, yielded thousands of American silver certificates, Canadian bank notes, American Express travellers checks, and Italian bank notes, but no other valuables. This outcome apparently confirmed other speculation that most Andrea Doria passengers, in anticipation of the ship's scheduled arrival in New York City the following morning, had already retrieved their valuables prior to the collision.

Evelyn Bartram Dudas (22) was the first woman to successfully dive onto Andrea Doria. Dudas reached the wreck in June 1967; she and her future husband, John Dudas, retrieved the ship's compass. Other well-known divers to explore Andrea Doria are Steve Belinda, John Chatterton, Gary Gentile, Gary Gilligan, Richie Kohler and John Mattera.

As of 2010, years of ocean submersion have taken their toll. The wreck has aged and deteriorated extensively, with the hull now fractured and collapsed. The upper decks have slowly slid off the wreck to the seabed below. As a result of this transformation, a large debris field flows out from the hull of the liner. Once-popular access points frequented by divers, such as Gimbel's hole, no longer exist. Divers call Andrea Doria a "noisy" wreck, as it emits various noises due to continual deterioration and from the ocean currents moving broken metal around inside the hull. However, due to this decay, new access areas are constantly opening up for future divers on the ever-changing wreck.

A 2016 expedition to the wreck by OceanGate revealed that Andrea Doria was decaying rapidly. "When you look at the shape of the hull, it appears a lot has come off," Stockton Rush, OceanGate's CEO, said. One of the pieces now broken off the wreck is the ship's bow. During dives using the submersible Cyclops 1, owned by OceanGate and piloted by Stockton Rush, damage was caused to Andrea Doria after direct collision on the port side of the bow.

After years of removal of artifacts by divers, little of value was thought to remain. Significant artifacts recovered include the statue of Genoese Admiral Andrea Doria, for whom the ship was named. It was removed from the first-class lounge, having been cut off at the ankles to accomplish this. Examples of the ship's china have long been considered valuable mementos of diving the wreck. The ship's bell is normally considered to be the prize of a wreck. This ship carried three bells: one bell located on the bridge, and two much larger ceremonial bells located on the fore and aft decks. The ship's stern bell was retrieved in the late 1980s by a team of divers led by Bill Nagle. On 26 June 2010, a diver from New Jersey, Carl Bayer, diving from the Narragansett, Rhode Island–based dive boat Explorer, owned by Capt. Dave Sutton, discovered the bridge bell lying on the bottom at 73 m (241 ft). He recovered it with assistance from Ernie Rookey, also from New Jersey. The bell, 410 mm (16 in) tall and weighing 33.3 kg (73.5 lb), was possibly used to signal fog on the night of the collision. The forward bell remains undiscovered. It has for years been thought to be in the ship's paint locker where it was stored during ocean crossings, but recent reports indicate that this part of the ship has collapsed in on itself and the forward bell may never be found.

In 2017 a salvage team recovered one of the ship's two foghorns. In July 2021 the restored foghorn was sounded at the New Jersey Maritime Museum to commemorate the 65th anniversary of the sinking.

=== Diving fatalities ===
Artifact recovery on Andrea Doria has resulted in additional loss of life. At least 22 scuba divers have lost their lives diving on the wreck, and diving conditions at the wreck site are considered very treacherous. Strong currents and heavy sediment that can reduce visibility to zero pose serious hazards to diving this site. Dr. Robert Ballard (who found the wrecks of the ocean liner RMS Titanic, the German battleship Bismarck, the American aircraft carrier Yorktown and torpedo boat PT-109) who visited the site in a US Navy submersible in 1995, reported that thick fishing nets draped the hull. An invisible web of thin fishing lines, which can snag scuba gear, increases danger. The wreck is slowly collapsing; the top of the wreck is now at 58 metres (190 ft), and many of the passageways have begun to collapse.

The wreck site is nicknamed "The Everest of Wreck Diving" because of the number of deaths exploring the site.

- 1956: William Edgerton, 23, part of an effort to photograph the recently sunk Andrea Doria, died shortly after one of the valves on his breathing apparatus became partially closed.
- 1981: John Barnett drowned while diving on Andrea Doria.
- 1984: Frank Kennedy surfaced unconscious after a dive on Andrea Doria and died on board RV Wahoo before help arrived.
- 1985: John Ormsby drowned after being caught in wires.
- 1988: Joe Drozd died during a dive on Andrea Doria.
- 1992: Mathew Lawrence and Mike Scofield drowned while diving on Andrea Doria.
- 1993: Robert Santuli died from oxygen poisoning while diving on Andrea Doria.
- 1998: Craig Sicola, Richard Roost, and Vincent Napoliello all died diving on Andrea Doria.
- 1999: Christopher Murley and Charles J. McGurr both died of apparent heart attacks preparing for a second dive.
- 2002: William Schmoldt died from decompression sickness.
- 2006: Underwater explorer David Bright died from decompression sickness.
- 2008: Terry DeWolf of Houston, Texas, died during a dive on the wreck site; the cause of death was not determined.
- 2011: Michael LaPrade of Los Angeles died during a dive on the wreck.
- 2015: Tom Pritchard was presumed dead after diving on the wreck.
- 2017: Steven Slater of Gateshead, England, was pulled from the water unconscious and could not be revived.

== Legacy ==
=== MS Stockholm ===
Stockholm's bow was replaced in New York at a cost of $1 million.

Stockholm continued to sail for nearly 80 years under various names. In late 2025, after years of neglect in Rotterdam, it was finally sold for scrap following an auction by order of a local court.

=== Survivors ===
Survivors went on with their lives with a wide range of experiences. Captain Calamai never accepted another command, and lived the rest of his life in sadness "as a man who has lost a son", according to his daughter. Most of the other officers returned to the sea. Some survivors had mental problems for years after the incident, while others felt their experience had helped them value their lives more preciously.

=== In culture ===
==== Artwork ====
- Two bronze medallions, commissioned by survivors Pierette Domenica Simpson and Jerome Reinert and survivor's daughter Angela Addario, are in the South Street Seaport Museum of New York, and in the Museo del Mare of Genova, Italy.
- California sculptor Daniel Oberti created the two works called The Greatest Sea Rescue in History.
- A large-scale painting, The Andrea Doria Crosses the World Trade Center by Ronald Mallory, was commissioned by Port Authority of New York and New Jersey for Windows on the World at the World Trade Center. The painting hung on the 107th floor since 1982, and was lost with the destruction of the towers on 11 September 2001.
- An oil painting, The Andrea Doria in Genoa Harbor by Michael E. Von Drak, commissioned June 1986 by Bruno P. Pella for his Ristorante Grifone, San Francisco, California.

==== Music ====
In 1969 Polish rock band Niebiesko-Czarni with singer Wojciech Korda recorded the song "Andrea Doria"

In 1973, German singer Udo Lindenberg published an album titled Alles klar auf der Andrea Doria (All's Well on the Andrea Doria), containing a song of the same name.

The liner is also referenced in the Steely Dan song "Things I Miss The Most" from their 2003 album Everything Must Go.

In 1986 Brazilian rock band Legião Urbana recorded the song "Andrea Doria" in their second album Dois.

==== Books ====
The liner is mentioned in more than 500 of the many written biographies of Elvis Presley, because one of the survivors was Mike Stoller of the songwriting team Jerry Leiber and Mike Stoller. As Stoller reached the port of New York, Leiber informed him at the main dock that their 1952 composition "Hound Dog", a number one R&B record for Big Mama Thornton, was once more and right there and then, the number one record in the nation in all three charts: R&B, Pop and C&W, albeit this time "by a young Mississippian by the name of Elvis Presley". Stoller, who had been in Europe for over 10 months, did not know who Presley was, so he asked Leiber the now famous "Elvis who?". They would go on to write several more number one hits, including two written exclusively for Presley, "Don't", a number one in early 1958, as well as the title song and most of the soundtrack for Presley's third movie, the 1957 MGM production of the mega hit "Jailhouse Rock".

The liner is also mentioned often in the book Shadow Divers by Robert Kurson. This true story talks about many of the divers that dove on the Andrea Doria and about some of their dives.

===== Fiction =====
In Clive Cussler's Serpent (1999), Andrea Doria was purposely sunk by the secret organization called the "Brotherhood" to hide the fact of pre-Columbian contact of Mayans and Europe made by Phoenicians. The liner was carrying a large stone tablet that was essential to find out the long lost Phoenician treasure.

In Tom Clancy's World War III thriller Red Storm Rising, a Soviet submarine uses the wreck of the Andrea Doria as a hiding place.

I Was Shipwrecked on the Andrea Doria! The Titanic of the 1950s was written by survivor Pierette Domenica Simpson.

===== Non-fiction =====
Several books have been written about the Andrea Doria. Each presented information not contained in the others, thereby providing varying perspectives.

- The story of the accident was retold by Alvin Moscow in his book Collision Course: The Story of the Collision Between the 'Andrea Doria' and the 'Stockholm, published in 1959.
- Ile de France's Captain Raoul de Beaudéan's memoirs were translated and published in the US in 1960, under the title Captain of the Ile by McGraw Hill Book Company; its Chapter 12, titled "A Tragic Night", covers the rescue of the passengers of the Andrea Doria.
- Author William Hoffer's Saved: the Story of the Andrea Doria – The Greatest Sea Rescue in History was published in 1979.
- The 2002 book Deep Descent: Adventure and Death Diving the Andrea Doria ISBN 0-74-340063-1, by Kevin F. McMurray recounts diving the wreck and some of the incidents that have led to divers' deaths.
- In 2003, Richard Goldstein wrote Desperate Hours: The Epic Rescue of the Andrea Doria.
- In 2004, Shadow Divers, by Robert Kurson, provides accounts of wreckage divers at the site as a precursor to the book's main story.
- The 2005 book The Lost Ships of Robert Ballard by Robert Ballard, and Rick Archbold (with paintings by Ken Marschall) has a chapter about the liner and its sinking.
- The most recent, Alive on the Andrea Doria: The Greatest Sea Rescue in History, is by survivor Pierette Domenica Simpson in 2006.

==== Onscreen and online ====
===== Films and videos =====
- Several documentaries have been produced. These include works by National Geographic Channel, PBS Secrets of the Dead, Discovery Channel, History Channel, and others.
- A seminarian from the Archdiocese of Chicago interviewed two priests and a retired bishop, survivors of the Andrea Doria, and subsequently produced an oral history presentation titled Voices from the Andrea Doria, which can be accessed online.
- On the Waterfront (1954, by Elia Kazan) is the only film in which Andrea Doria is visible; in a scene, Terry Malloy (played by Marlon Brando) watches the ship as she descends the Hudson River.
- The 144th episode of the sitcom Seinfeld featured Andrea Doria as a plot device when the character George goes up against an Andrea Doria survivor to become the lessee of an apartment, and it is revealed that the character Kramer owns a book detailing "astonishing tales of the sea" and has extensive knowledge of the Andrea Doria.
- In the Superman: The Animated Series episode "World's Finest" (1997), a painting of the Andrea Doria can be seen on the wall behind Lois Lane while she is on a telephone call with Clark Kent. The Doria is depicted in an abstract fashion with nighttime Manhattan recognisable in the background. The painting is based on the same photograph used for the cover of historian William Miller's book Picture History of the Andrea Doria.
- In The Venture Bros. episode "Spanakopita", a safe from Andrea Doria is shown housed within a ship, owned by the villain, Augustus St. Cloud, among other various movie memorabilia such as the golden idol and stone pedestal from Raiders of the Lost Ark.
- In the Night Gallery episode "Lone Survivor", the crew of the RMS Lusitania picks up a lifeboat from the RMS Titanic on 7 May 1915, three years after Titanic sank. A man in the lifeboat claims to have supernaturally survived the wreck as a kind of human Flying Dutchman and tries, without success, to convince Lusitania's captain to alter course to avoid the torpedo attack he foresees. On 26 July 1956, the man is found again in a Lusitania lifeboat, this time by the crew of the Andrea Doria.
- The 2002 horror film Ghost Ship features the fictional Italian luxury liner Antonia Graza, whose design was based on that of Andrea Doria. This was mentioned in the special feature clips on the film's DVD release.
- Luca Guardabascio directed the 2016 docufilm Andrea Doria: Are the Passengers Saved? based on Pierette Domenica Simpson's non-fiction book, Alive on the Andrea Doria! The Greatest Sea Rescue in History.
- The action-adventure video game, Tomb Raider II, features a cluster of levels set in the wreck of an Italian cruise liner named The Maria Doria, implied to be a Sister ship to the Andrea Doria.
- In the film The Talented Mr. Ripley the launch that carries Herbert Greenleaf and Marge Sherwood away from Tom Ripley in Venice is called Andrea Doria.

==== Photography ====
Photographer Robert F. McCrystal, from the Providence Journal, was the first to photograph the fatally struck Andrea Doria from an airplane. One of his photographs ran on the cover of LIFE Magazine.

Boston newspaper photographer Harry A. Trask, who arrived at the scene in a small airplane after many media people had left, took a series of photographs of Andrea Doria's final moments above water, which won a Pulitzer Prize.

==== Online and film ====
- Andrea Doria – Tragedy and Rescue at Sea (23 July 2005). AndreaDoria.org.
- Alive on the Andrea Doria! The Greatest Sea Rescue in History and
- Andrea Doria – The Sinking of the Unsinkable Gare Maritime
- Andrea Doria. Lost Liners: PBS Online.
- Secrets of the Dead: The Sinking of the Andrea Doria on PBS Online and also shown on The History Channel – see Secrets of the Dead The Sinking of the Andrea Doria (TV episode 2006) – IMDb
- Night Gallery Kurson, Robert (2015). Pirate Hunters. Random House. ISBN 9781400063369. Season 1, Episode 5, "Lone Survivor" (TV episode 1971) – IMDb
- What Happened to the Andrea Doria, Casual Navigation, 2019 (YouTube video)
- Catastrophe (1977), hosted by William Conrad
- The Story of The Andrea Doria (YouTube video)
- Secrets Of The Lost Liners : Andrea Doria (Sky History)

== See also ==
- SS Leonardo da Vinci (1958)
- Quester I
- RMS Empress of Ireland
- SS Columbia (1880)
- List of disasters in Massachusetts by death toll

== Sources ==
- Moscow, Alvin (1981) [1959]. Collision Course. Putnam Publishing Group. ISBN 978-0-448-12019-5.
