= MS Stockholm (1946) =

Cruise ship

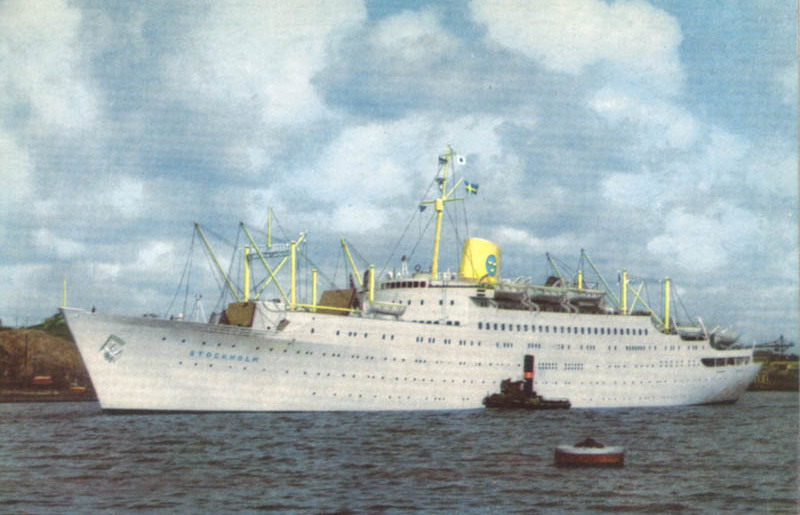
- MS Stockholm, c. 1952

History
- Name: 1948–1960: Stockholm; 1960–1985: Völkerfreundschaft; 1985–1986: Volker; 1986–1993: Fridtjof Nansen; 1993–1994: Italia I; 1994–1998: Italia Prima; 1998–2002: Valtur Prima; 2002–2005: Caribe; 2005–2013: Athena; 2013–2016: Azores; 2016–2026: Astoria
- Owner: 1948–1960: Swedish America Line; 1960–1964: Freier Deutscher Gewerkschaftsbund; 1964–1973: VEB Deutsche Seereederei; 1973–1985: VEB Deutsche Seereederei/Deutfracht; 1985–1989: Neptunus Rex Enterprises; 1989–1993: StarLauro; 1993–2003: Nina SpA; 2003–2005: Festival Crociere SpA; 2005–2008: Classic International Cruises; 2008–2013: First Quality Cruises Inc; 2013–2021: Islands Cruises Transportes Marítimos; 2021–2022: Brock Pierce; 2023-2025: Brock Pierce, The Roundtable LLC.; 2025-2026: Galloo
- Operator: 1948–1960: Swedish America Line; 1960–1966: VEB Deutsche Seereederei; 1966–1985: VEB Deutsche Seereederei (summer) / Stena Line (winter); 1994–1995: Nina Cia. di Navigazione; 1995–1998: Neckermann Seereisen; 1998–2001: Valtur Tourist; 2002–2004:Festival Cruises; 2005–2013: Classic International Cruises; 2009: Phoenix Reisen; 2013–2014: Portuscale Cruises; 2015–2020 Cruise & Maritime Voyages
- Port of registry: 1948–1960: Gothenburg, Sweden; 1960–1985: Rostock, East Germany; 1985–1989: Panama City, Panama; 1989–2004: Naples, Italy; 2004–2025: Madeira, Portugal
- Ordered: October 1944
- Builder: Götaverken, Gothenburg, Sweden
- Yard number: 611
- Launched: 9 September 1946
- Christened: 9 September 1946
- Acquired: 7 February 1948
- In service: 21 February 1948
- Out of service: 2020
- Identification: Swedish Official Number 8926 (1948); Italian Official Number 1749 (1993); Call sign CQRV (Portugal); IMO number: 5383304; MMSI number: 255801380 (Portugal)
- Fate: Sold for scrap in Ghent
- Status: Undergoing scrapping at Galloo, Ghent

General characteristics (as built)
- Type: Ocean liner
- Tonnage: 12,165 GRT; 4,700 DWT
- Length: 160.08 m (525 ft 2 in)
- Beam: 21.04 m (69 ft 0 in)
- Draught: 7.90 m (25 ft 11 in)
- Installed power: 2 × 8-cylinder Götaverken diesel engines; 8,900 kW (12,000 hp) (combined)
- Speed: 17 knots (31 km/h; 20 mph)
- Capacity: 390 passengers

General characteristics (currently)
- Type: Cruise ship
- Tonnage: 15,614 GT
- Installed power: 2 × Wärtsilä 16V32; 10,700 kW (14,300 hp) (combined)
- Speed: 19 knots (35 km/h; 22 mph)
- Capacity: 556 passengers

MS Stockholm was a passenger ship that was constructed as a transatlantic ocean liner for the Swedish American Line, and later rebuilt into a cruise ship. Stockholm is best known for the accidental collision with the Andrea Doria in July 1956, which resulted in the sinking of the Italian liner with 46 fatalities off the coast of Nantucket, Massachusetts.

During her seven decades of service, she passed through several owners and sailed under the names Stockholm, Völkerfreundschaft, Volker, Fridtjof Nansen, Italia I, Italia Prima, Valtur Prima, Caribe, Athena, and Azores before beginning service as Astoria in March 2016. Astoria sailed with Cruise & Maritime Voyages until the company ceased operations in 2020 due to the COVID-19 pandemic. After being laid up for several years in Rotterdam, the historic vessel was finally sold for scrap in 20 June 2025. On 4 July 2025, Astoria was towed from Rotterdam to Ghent for recycling.

== MS Stockholm ==
The ship was ordered in 1944, and launched 9 September 1946, as Stockholm by Götaverken in Gothenburg for the Swedish America Line (SAL). The ship was designed by Swedish American Line designer, Eric Christiansson, who worked as the technical director at parent company Broström. She was the fourth ship named Stockholm for Swedish American Line, but the second of the four to actually sail under the name (See: MS Stockholm (1941)). When Stockholm III was sold to the Italians, the proceeds were initially left aside, but were later used to finance the construction of the ship after the 1941 Stockholm was sunk during the war.

At 525 feet (160.02 m) with a gross register tonnage of 12,165, Stockholm at the time was the smallest passenger ship operating on the North Atlantic route, but the largest passenger ship built in Sweden, with the largest diesel propulsion unit yet built in Sweden. Originally designed to carry a total of 395 passengers, divided between first and tourist class, and a cargo capacity of 3,000 tons. Interiors were completed by Swedish artists, including Kurt Jungstedt. When delivered, the ship would replace the aging SS Drottningholm, and run an alternating transatlantic service with MS Gripsholm. She made her maiden voyage on 21 February 1948, under the command of Captain Waldemar Jonsson, from Gothenburg arriving in New York on March 1.

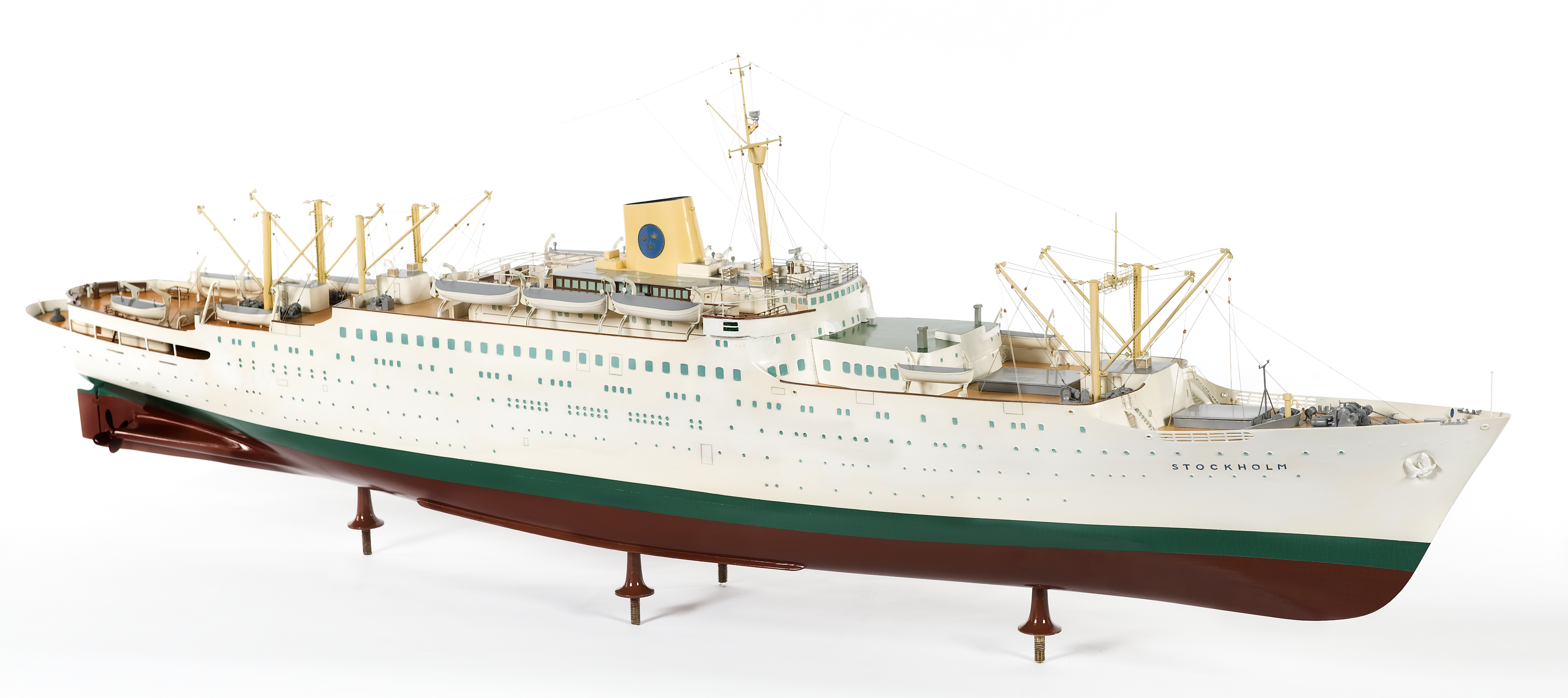
Model of MS Stockholm, displayed at Sjöhistoriska Museet in Stockholm

The Stockholm would continue to sail the transatlantic route, later joined by the new MS Kungsholm (1952). A 1953 refit expanded Stockholm's capacity to 548 people by infilling the outdoor aft and forward end of "A" Deck with passenger cabins. Due to the small size, and not handling the North Atlantic seas well during the colder months, the Swedish American Line scheduled her for occasional cruises starting in 1953 out of Morehead City, North Carolina cruising to Havana, Nassau, and Bermuda. In February 1955, she was used to deport Arne Pettersen, the last person to go through Ellis Island, to Gothenburg, Sweden. A later refit in 1956-57 added a cinema to the deck forward end of the main superstructure, and an outdoor pool aft.

With both MS Kungsholm and the new MS Gripsholm (1957) sailing, the smaller Stockholm was started to be seen as too small and not meeting the current standards of the line. The ship was sold in May 1959 to, at the time, an unidentified German company. The ship would finish out the year sailing with Swedish American Line to New York, before being transferred in 1960 to the new company.

== Collision with Andrea Doria ==
26 July 1956: After colliding with Andrea Doria, Stockholm, with severely damaged bow heads to New York

On the night of 25 July 1956, at 11:10 p.m., in heavy fog in the North Atlantic Ocean off the coast of Nantucket, Stockholm and Andrea Doria of the Italian Line collided in what was to become one of history's most notorious maritime disasters.

Although most passengers and crew survived the collision, the larger Andrea Doria luxury liner capsized and sank the following morning. Flooding from the collision caused Andrea Doria to list 18 degrees to starboard within minutes, quickly rendering 50% of her lifeboats unusable. However, a number of ships, including SS Ile de France, responded and provided assistance, which averted a massive loss of life.

Five members of Stockholm's crew were killed instantly, and several more were trapped in the wrecked bow. Despite having lost about 3 feet (0.9 m) of freeboard, the crippled Stockholm helped in the rescue and ended up carrying 327 passengers and 245 crew members from Andrea Doria, in addition to her own passengers and crew. There were 46 fatalities. After the ships had separated, and as Stockholm crew members were beginning to survey the damage, one of the crew came across Linda Morgan, who had been thrown from her bed on Andrea Doria as the two ships collided and landed on Stockholm's deck, suffering moderate, but not life-threatening, injuries.

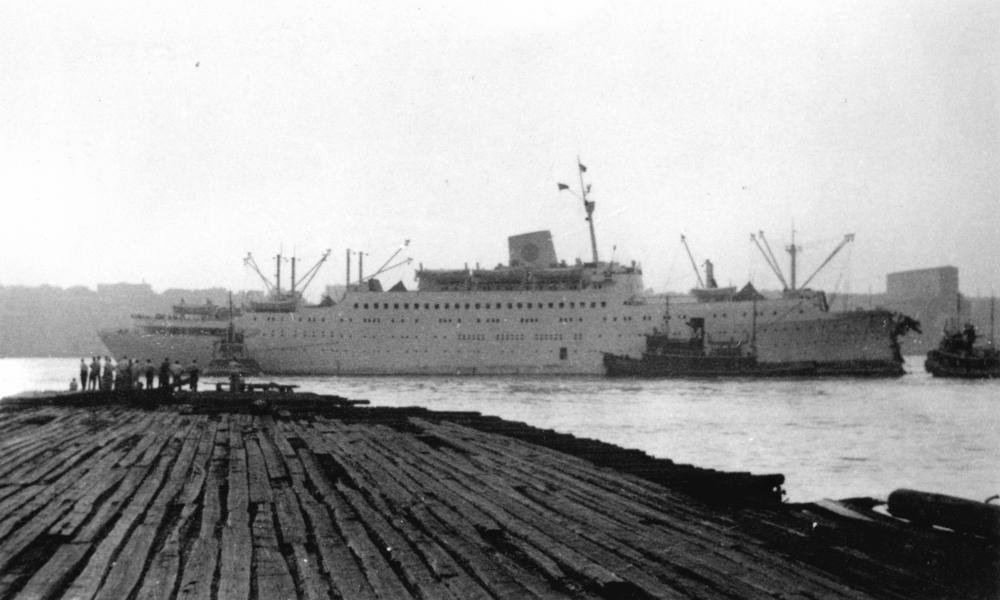
Damaged Stockholm entering port of New York

After Andrea Doria sank, Stockholm sailed to New York City under her own power and arrived on 27 July. There, the crushed bow portion was rebuilt at a cost of US$1 million three months later at Bethlehem Shipyard in Brooklyn, New York. An inquiry followed the events, with a settlement reached after six months between the Italian Line and Swedish American Line.

=== Wreckage from collision ===
==== Ship's bell ====
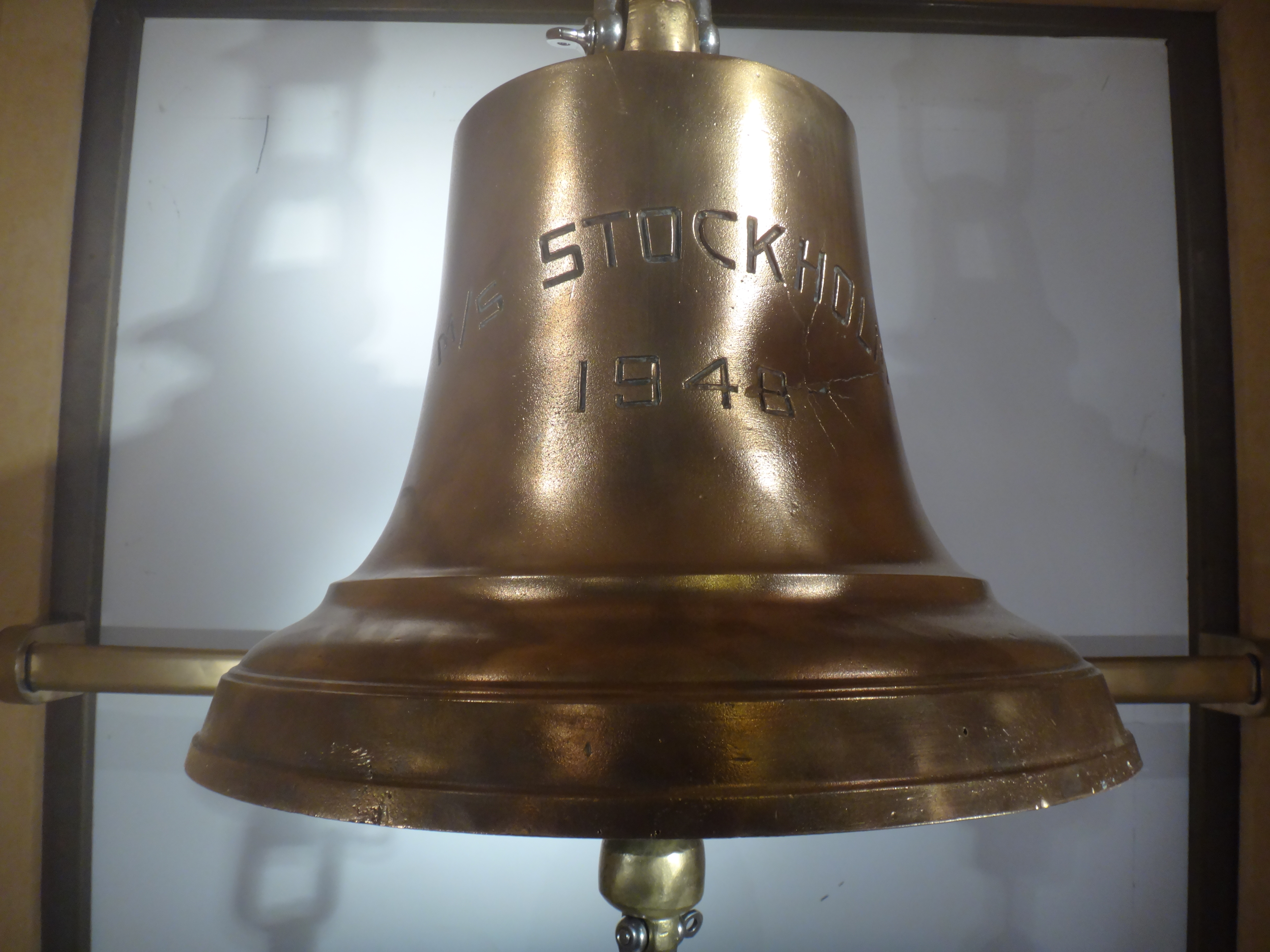
Damaged bell from the bow of Stockholm, salvaged from the wreck of Andrea Doria and displayed on board Astoria. As of 2025, the bell is no longer on display.

Years following the collision, Andrea Doria became a popular dive site. In 1959, Stockholm's damaged ship's bell was recovered from the wreck site. It was displayed on board in the ship's lobby but it was removed in 2025 when the ship arrived at Ghent for scrapping.

==== Discovery of the bow wreckage ====
In September 2020, New Jersey–based Atlantic Wreck Salvage announced that their ship, D/V Tenacious, had discovered Stockholm's bow and anchors. The divers made the confirmation based on the presence and unique style of both anchors, internal bow reinforcements, accordion-style crumpling on the wreckage in the same pattern as seen in photos of Stockholm after the collision, and the location of the wreckage near Andrea Doria's final resting place.

== East German ship Völkerfreundschaft ==
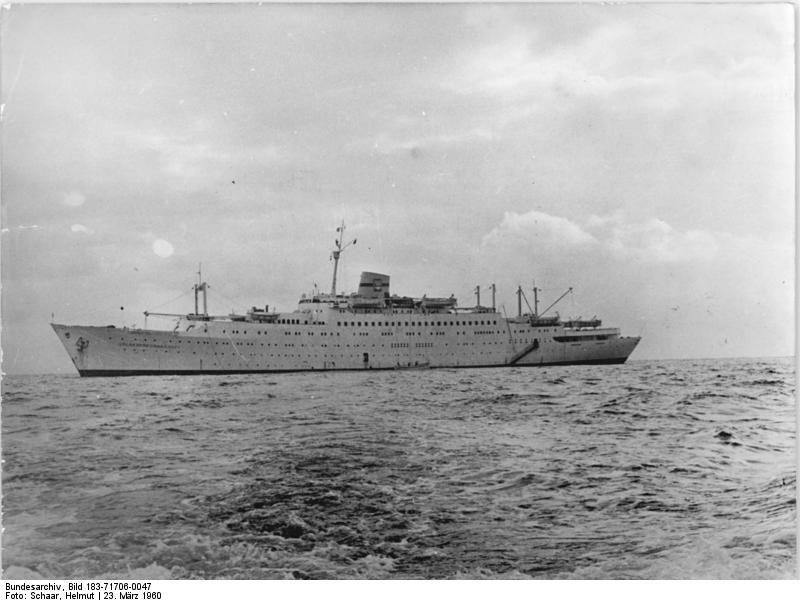
The ship in 1961, sailing as Völkerfreundschaft

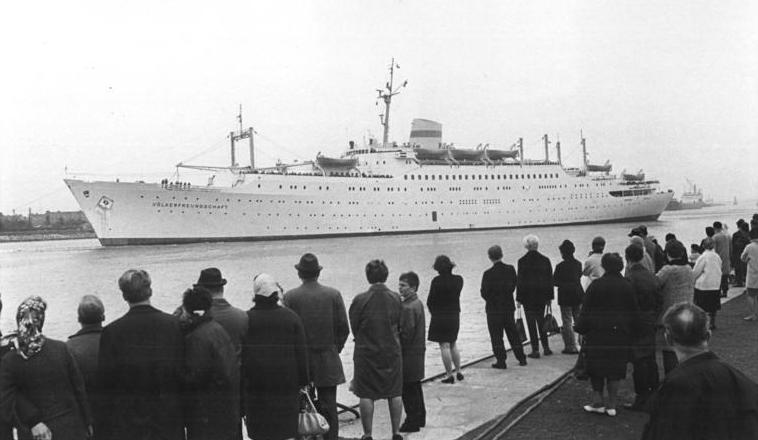
Völkerfreundschaft docked in Warnemünde, 1968

On 3 January 1960, Stockholm was transferred to the East German government for 20 million Swedish krona, renaming the ship Völkerfreundschaft ("friendship between nations") operating under the line Deutsche Seereederei (German Shipping Company), a precursor of AIDA Cruises.

Völkerfreundschaft made her new maiden voyage on 23 February 1960, and was home-ported in Rostock, Germany, eventually operating in tandem with the newly built Fritz Heckert. When the Berlin wall went up in 1961, all port visits were restricted to communist countries only, which greatly limited sailing routes. The ship made trips to Cuba, and would be one of the two ships that was en route to Havana during the Cuban Missile Crisis, where she was suspiciously watched by US military planes and vessels. The ship was already halfway to Havana, and it was necessary to continue to resupply and refuel. Carrying German and Czech holidaymakers, she passed through the American blockade line, accompanied by a United States Navy destroyer at a distance of two nautical miles. The vessel reached Havana unscathed, quickly turning back to East Germany after her arrival.

In 1964, the ship was put under the management of the Free German Trade Union Federation, but would be chartered out to western European countries for a majority of the year. This arrangement would be expanded in 1967, with Stena Line chartering the ship for Swedish passengers for half of the year, doing so annually until the ship was sold in 1985 due to its age and continued losses, which reached 70 million East German marks between 1975 and 1980.

=== Appearance in East German disaster movie ===
Völkerfreundschaft made an appearance as the luxury liner Astoria in the 1979 East German film Die Rache des Kapitäns Mitchell. In the movie, she collides with a coal freighter in fog and threatens to sink. Captain Mitchell, portrayed by Dieter Mann, organizes the orderly rescue of passengers.

=== Incidents during East German service ===
The ship saw multiple incidents during her service under the Deutsche Seereederei. In 1968, the Bundesmarine submarine chaser Najade rammed the vessel during its rescue of East German defector Manfred Semmig, who had fallen into the sea while attempting to escape the vessel via a clothesline. The ship had made an unexpected turn after Semming had fallen into the sea, resulting in a collision as Najade attempted to avoid running over the man. Tilting nearly 30 degrees after its collision with Völkerfreundschaft, Najade recovered and safely rescued the defector. This was followed by an incident in 1970 where a machinist and three medical researchers leapt off the Cuba-bound ship near the Florida Keys and were rescued by a small boat driven by the machinist's brother.

On 21 January 1983, the ship collided with West German Navy submarine U-26 in the Baltic Sea off the Fehmarn Belt. Sailing on surface in rough seas, the commander of the submarine ordered the boat to be navigated via periscope and without the use of radar – a common procedure at the time during the Cold War in the vicinity of naval vessels of the Warsaw Pact. A court of lay judges in Kiel later judged that this accident could have been avoided with radar. Damages to U-26 cost multiple millions of West German Marks in repairs.

== Norwegian barracks ship Fridtjof Nansen ==
In 1985 she was transferred to a Panamanian company, Neptunas Rex Enterprises. Her name was reduced to Volker, and by the end of the year she was laid up in Southampton, England. In 1985 the ship was renamed Fridtjof Nansen was later used as a barracks ship in Oslo for asylum seekers in Norway.

== Rebuilding into a modern cruise ship ==
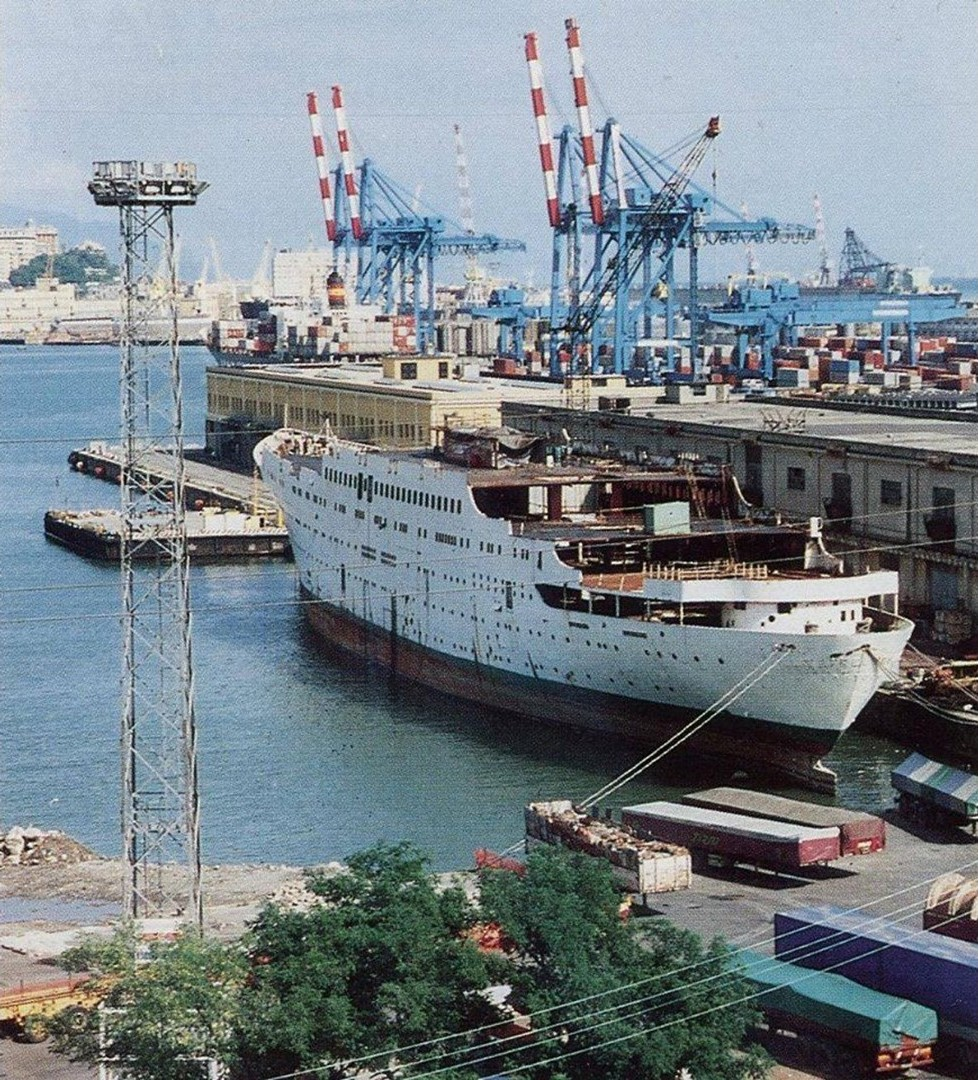
Conversion into a cruise ship at a Genoa shipyard in 1993

In 1989, ex-Stockholm was sold to the Italian Star Lauro Lines, who intended to convert the liner into a luxury cruise ship. The ship was still under charter as the Fridtjof Nansen, and so remained in Oslo until 1993. The ship was towed to a shipyard in Genoa, Italy, Andrea Doria's home port; but when she arrived, the press labeled her "the ship of death" (La nave della morte) due to the collision with Andrea Doria. During conversion, it was discovered that the ex-Stockholm was in very good condition.

== Cruise ship ==
=== Italia I – Italia Prima – Valtur Prima ===
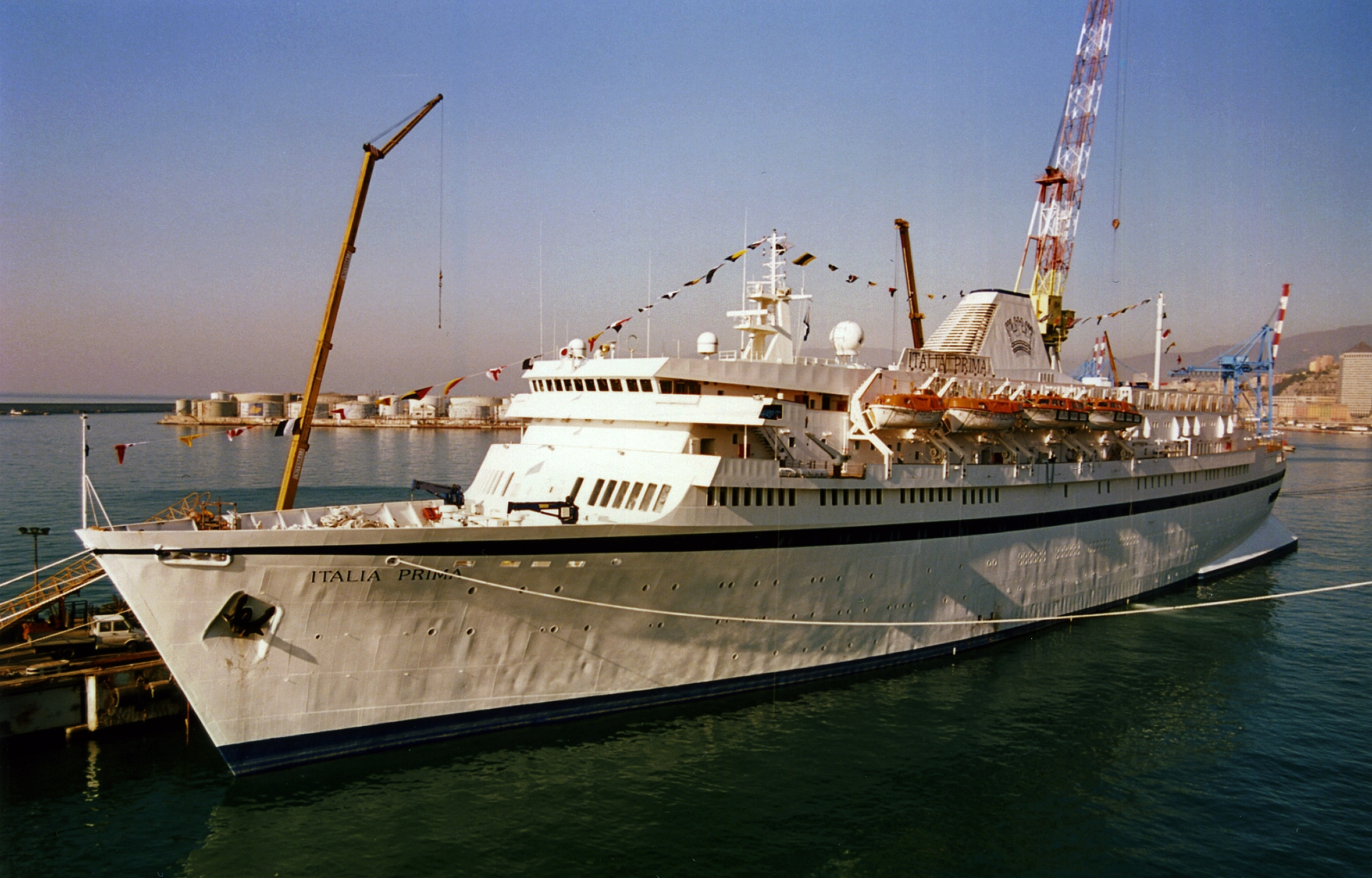
As Italia Prima in Genoa, in 1994

Following the completion of the refit in 1994, the ship was named Italia I, then Italia Prima, she later sailed as Valtur Prima primarily to Cuba, and was laid up in Havana following the September 11 attacks.

=== Caribe ===
The ship was chartered by Festival Cruises in 2002 for a five-year period and was renamed Caribe. Although Festival Cruises intended to sail to Cuba on seven-day cruises, the plans fell through and the ship was sold to a Portuguese-based operator in 2004.

=== Athena ===
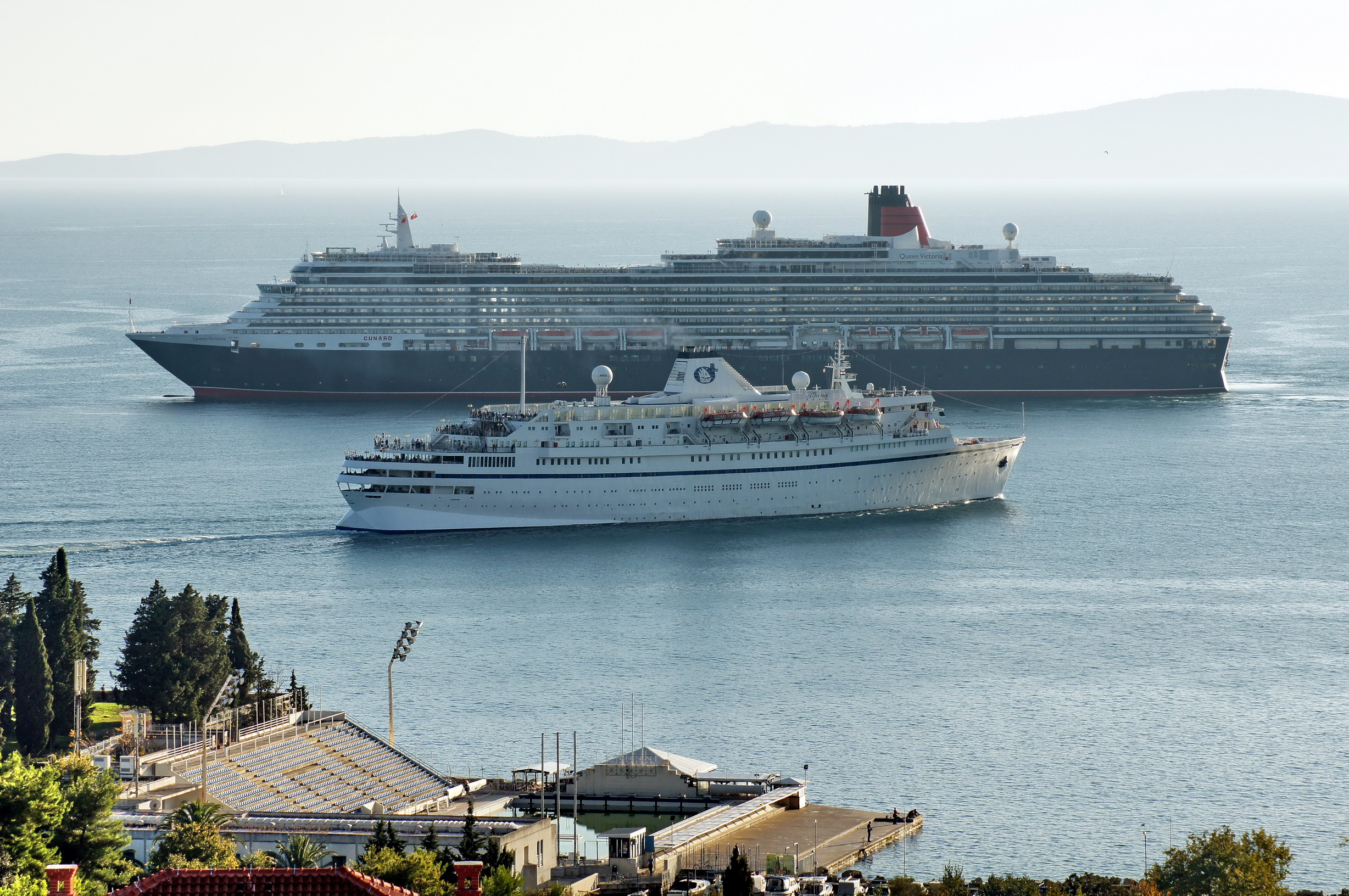
Athena passing Cunard's Queen Victoria in 2011

In 2005 the Caribe was renamed Athena, being registered in Portugal. She was later reflagged to Cyprus, operating for Classic International Cruises. On a transatlantic cruise in October 2006 the ship was caught in two violent hurricanes, causing a fatality and passengers threatening mutiny. The ship later safely arrived in Halifax, before continuing on to New York. Upon arrival, the New York Times approximated her arrival to 'the convict sentenced to 50 years for murder who completes his sentence and revisits the scene of the crime.'

==== Pirate attack ====
On December 3, 2008, Athena was attacked by pirates in the Gulf of Aden. Reportedly, 29 pirate boats surrounded the ship at one stage until a US Navy P-3 Orion maritime patrol aircraft circled above which caused some of the pirates to flee. The crew prevented the pirates from boarding by firing high-pressure water cannons at them. No one was injured and the ship escaped without damage, continuing her voyage to Australia.

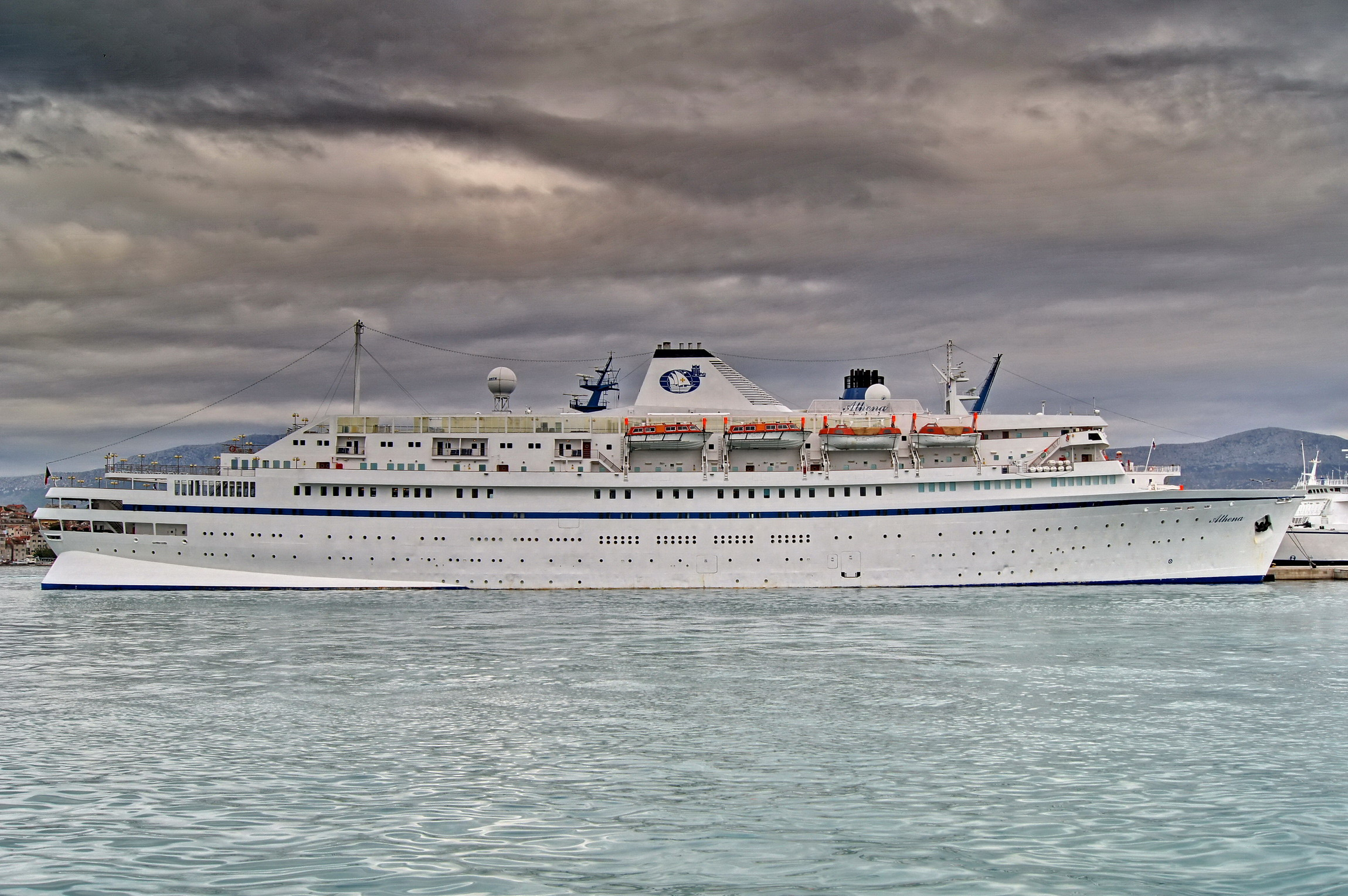
As Athena in Split, 22 October 2011

In 2009 the ship was chartered to German cruise operator Phoenix Reisen and repainted in the company colors with a turquoise funnel and company logo. On 17 September 2012, reports announced that she and her fellow ship Princess Danae were detained in Marseille, France, for unpaid fuel bills.

=== Azores ===
Early in 2013 Athena was bought by the recently created Portuguese cruise company Portuscale Cruises and renamed Azores. As soon as her acquisition was confirmed, she was taken to a shipyard in Marseille, where she was revamped. She then entered Portuscale Cruises service after completing a charter for Berlin-based Ambiente Kreuzfahrten, from whom she was chartered to Classic International to join her fleetmate Princess Daphne.

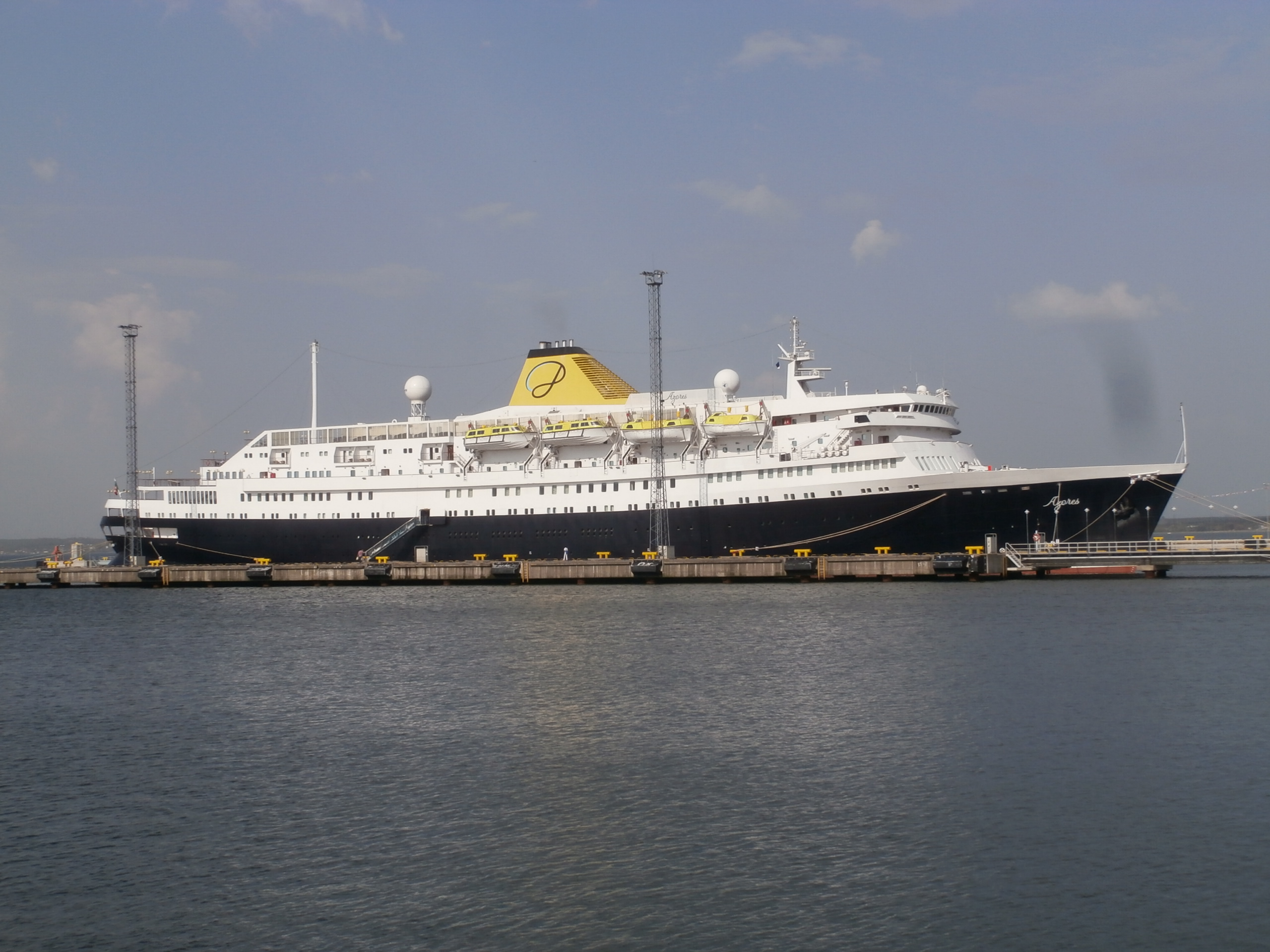
As Azores in Tallinn, 2014

The charter began in March 2014 with a cruise from Lisbon, Portugal, to Bremerhaven, Germany, and concluded in November 2014 in Genoa, Italy. After Portuscale's collapse, the administrator of the ship's formal owner, Island Cruises—Transportes Marítimos, Unipessoal Ltda., secured a charter to Cruise & Maritime Voyages (CMV). Her first voyage was from Avonmouth Docks to the Caribbean in January 2015. In April 2015, she was blocked from port due to unpaid debts, stranding passengers aboard until the issue was resolved.

=== Astoria ===
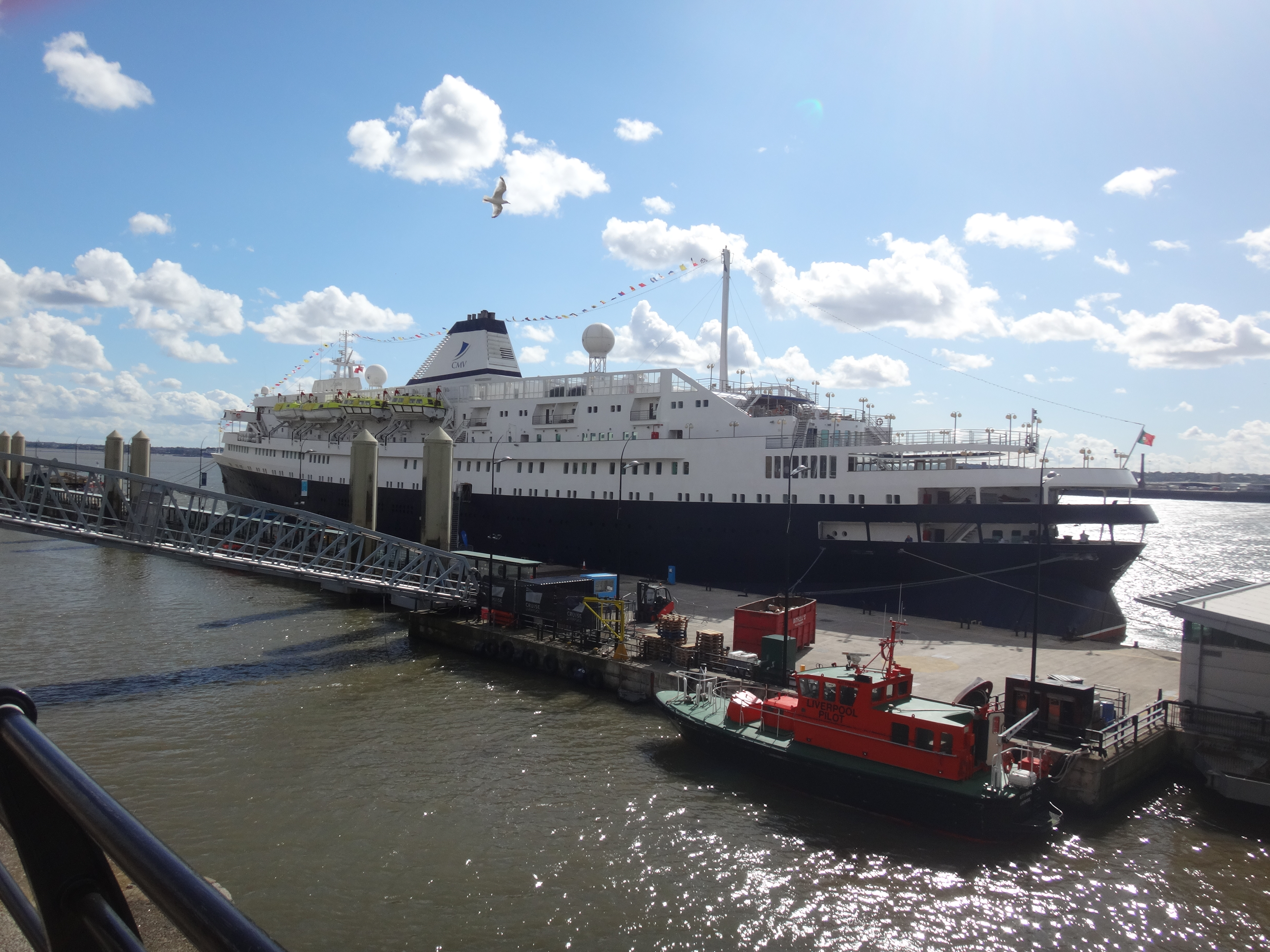
Azores with Cruise & Maritime Voyages in Liverpool, 2015

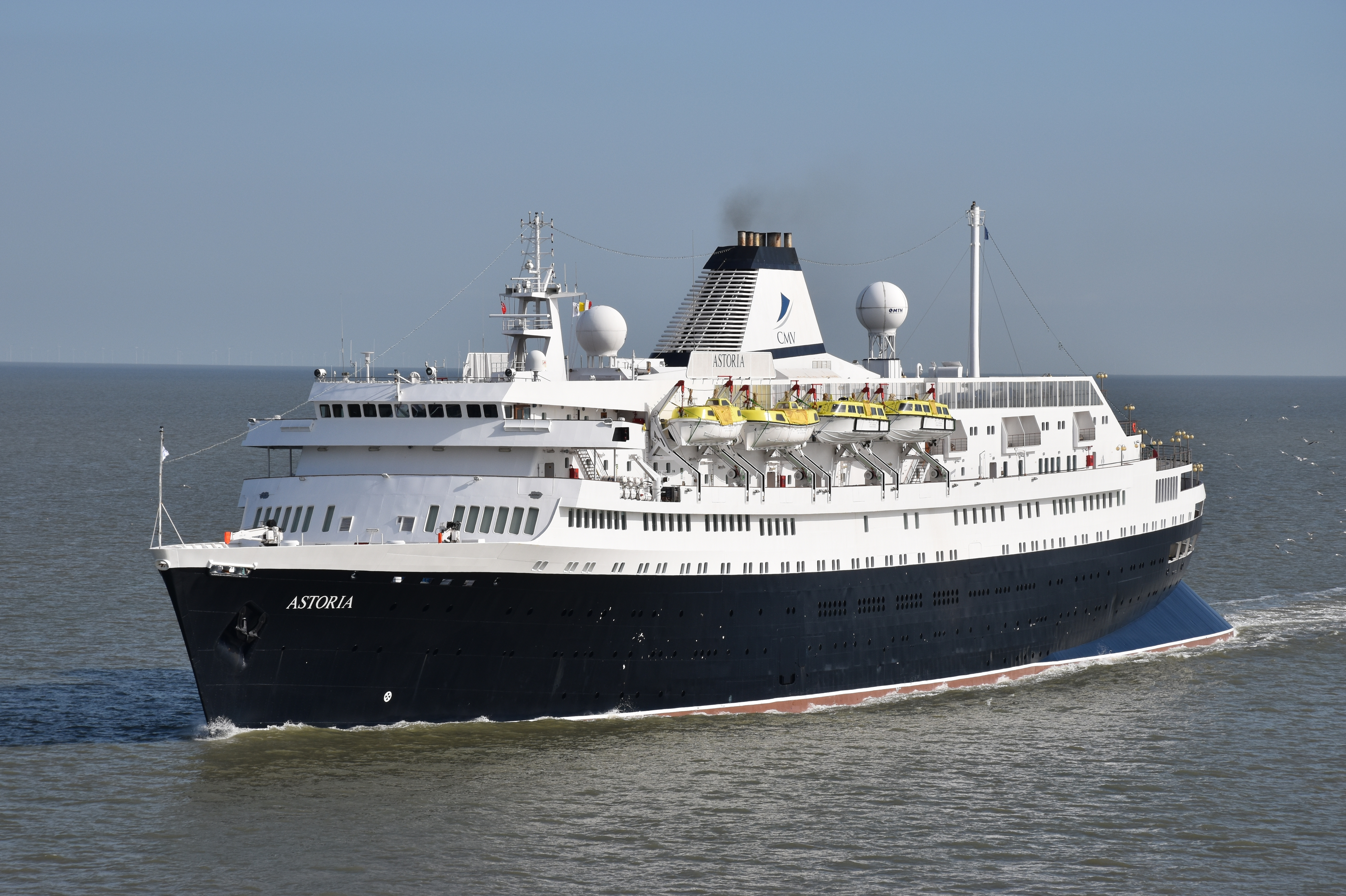
Astoria in the Thames Estuary, 7 March 2017

In March 2016 the ship was renamed Astoria by Cruise & Maritime Voyages and from May 2016 until March 2017 was subchartered to French tour operator Rivages du Monde. Astoria was the last remaining vessel of the former Swedish American Line still afloat after the former Kungsholm was scrapped in 2016.

In June 2016, CMV announced that Astoria would be leaving the CMV fleet after her final cruise on April 27, 2017, from London Tilbury. In February 2017, CMV announced that Astoria would remain in the CMV fleet until 2018. She would offer a mini-season from London Tilbury, before being charted by Rivages du Monde during the summer months.

Astoria was scheduled to begin winter cruising the Sea of Cortez from the port of Puerto Peñasco (Rocky Point) Mexico from December 2019, but this sailing only took place until January 2020 due to unspecified delays in dry dock. The 2020 cruise season was intended to be the last for Astoria in the CMV fleet.

During the COVID-19 pandemic and the bankruptcy of CMV, 47 crew members of the Astoria began a hunger strike demanding the wages owed to them and repatriation home in mid-June, after weeks of appealing to CMV proved fruitless. Subsequently, the vessel was arrested by UK Maritime & Coastguard Agency officers in June 2020 following reports she was about to set sail and leave UK jurisdiction without arranging the repatriation of foreign crew members stranded in the UK by the COVID-19 pandemic. CMV entered administration in 2020.

== Layup and disposition ==
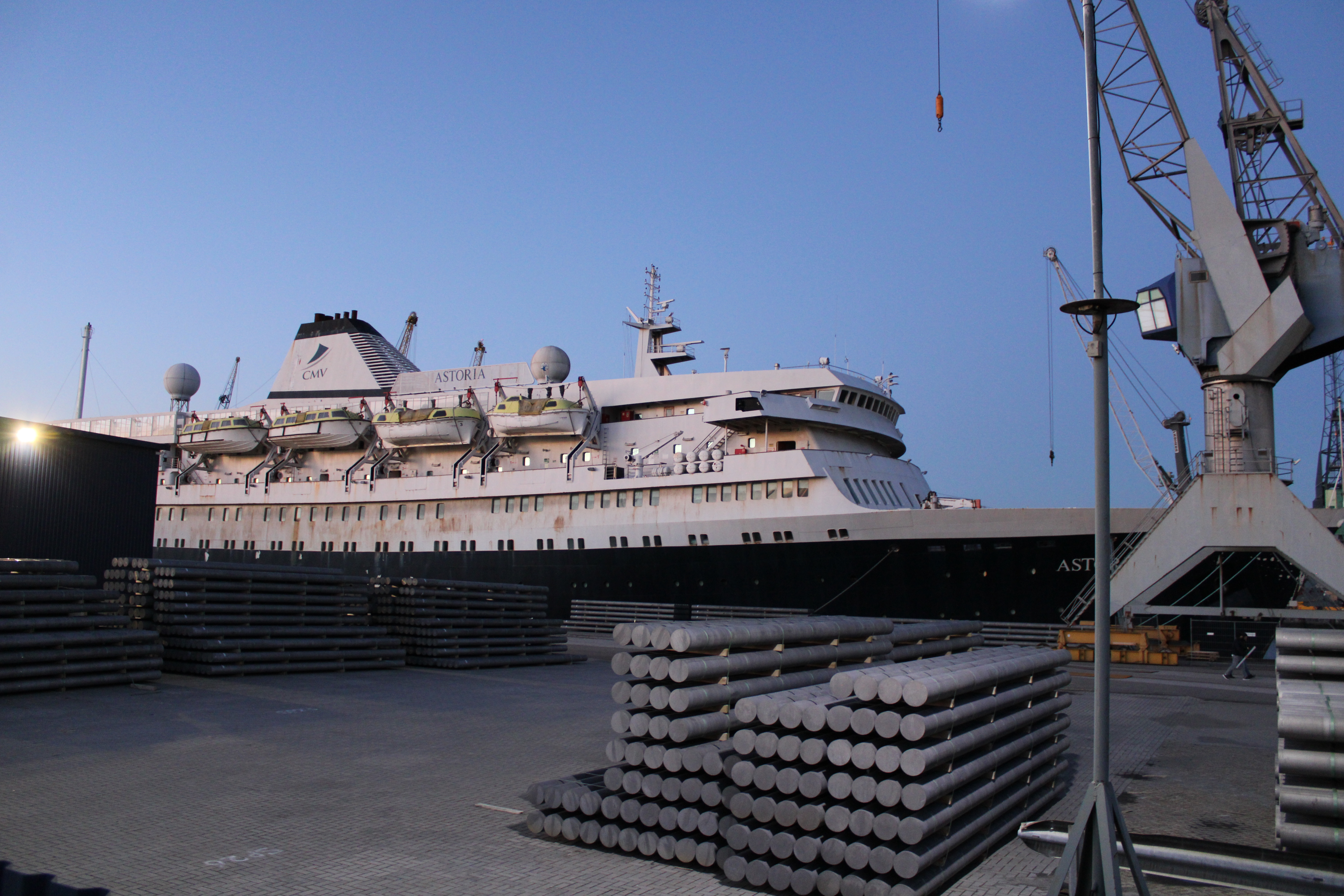
MV Astoria laid up in Waalhaven Dock 1, January 2024

Astoria was towed to Rotterdam and laid up in December 2020, and put up for auction on 1 March 2021, with a minimum sale price of €10 million, but received no offers until July 2021. The ship remained in custody pending decisions by owners and creditors.

In July 2021, the ship was purchased by The Roundtable LLC, a Puerto Rico–based affiliate of Brock Pierce, who also acquired the Funchal. The new owner intended to return Astoria to service, and convert Funchal to a hotelship.

After the ship broke loose from her moorings in February 2022 and crashed into the container ship Seatrade Orange during a storm, in March those plans were abandoned and the ship was again made available for sale, never having left Rotterdam. By December 2022, the ship was listed for sale on the online yacht sale platform Yachtworld, reduced to $5 million. After rumours of a scrap sale, Astoria's owner confirmed in January 2023 that they were continuing their attempts to make a sale for continued trading.

In June 2025, the ship, still laid up in Rotterdam, was again auctioned and sold for €200,000 to the sole bidder, the ship scrapping company Galloo, based at Ghent, Belgium. The buyer expected to move Astoria to Ghent in July, and was also required to settle any outstanding port fees from the previous owner before taking possession of the ship. On 3 July 2025, Astoria was towed from Rotterdam to Ghent for recycling, and arrived there the next day. As the dock she is moored to was lacking room for material from the ship, scrapping has proceeded at a slow pace, with the new superstructure added in 1995 being fully gone by June 2026. The original 1948 hull is currently being cut up with work starting in early September following the clearing of dock space.

== See also ==
- SS Monterey, served 66 years
- MS Dunnottar Castle, served for 68 years
- SS Germanic, served for 75 years
- SS Parthia, served for 86 years
- RMS Hecla, served for 94 years
- MV Doulos Phos, served for 95 years
