= TS King Edward =

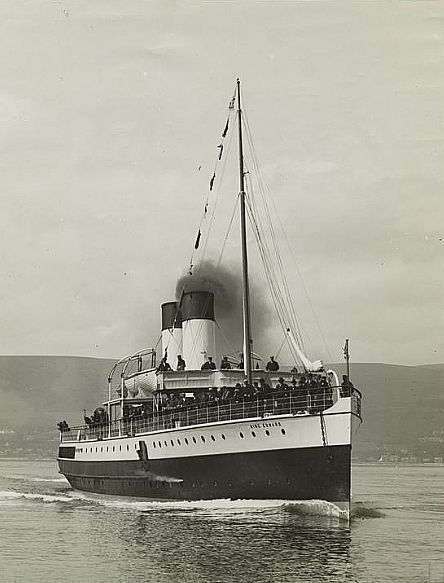
- TS King Edward on trials, 1901

History

United Kingdom
- Name: King Edward
- Owner: 1901–1927: Turbine Steamers; 1927–1935: Williamson-Buchanan Steamers Ltd; 1935–1942: London Midland and Scottish Railway; 1943–1952: Caledonian Steam Packet Company
- Operator: Owner
- Port of registry: (United Kingdom)
- Builder: William Denny and Brothers, Dumbarton
- Yard number: 651
- Launched: 16 May 1901
- Out of service: 1952
- Fate: Scrapped, 1952

General characteristics
- Type: Clyde steamer
- Tonnage: 502 GRT
- Displacement: 650 t
- Length: 250.5 ft (76.4 m)
- Beam: 30.1 ft (9.2 m)
- Propulsion: Steam turbine (3,500 HP); triple screw propellers, later single screw
- Speed: 20.48 knots

TS King Edward was an excursion steamer built at Dumbarton for service down the River Clyde to the Firth of Clyde and associated sea lochs on the west coast of Scotland, as far as Campbeltown. The first commercial vessel to be driven by steam turbines, King Edward operated as a Clyde steamer for half a century from 1901 until 1951, interrupted only by service in the two world wars. The success of the vessel quickly led to the adoption of turbine propulsion for all manner of merchant vessels, from channel ferries and coastal steamers to transatlantic liners.

== Background ==
In 1803, Charlotte Dundas showed the practicality of steam power for marine use, and in 1812 Henry Bell's PS Comet began the first commercially successful steamboat service in Europe, sailing on the River Clyde between Glasgow and Helensburgh. Others soon followed, and by mid century a large fleet of Clyde steamers competed for holiday and excursion traffic down the River and Firth of Clyde. By the end of the century paddle steamers had reached a peak of design, with a maximum economic operating speed of around 19 knots (35 km/h; 22 mph), but speed was at a premium, particularly on the longer routes such as sailings from Glasgow to Inveraray and Campbeltown. Up to this time, vessels had been powered by reciprocating steam engines. Steam was generated by boilers, and piped to cylinders wherein it drove pistons, the back-and-forth motion of which was converted to rotary motion by connecting rods. Early vessels were driven by paddle wheels, but at mid-century screws became more prevalent. Although increased boiler pressures and the reuse of partially expanded steam in compound engines greatly increased efficiency, the continual creation and destruction of momentum of their heavy reciprocating parts each turn of the crankshaft put great strain on the engines, which required constant maintenance.

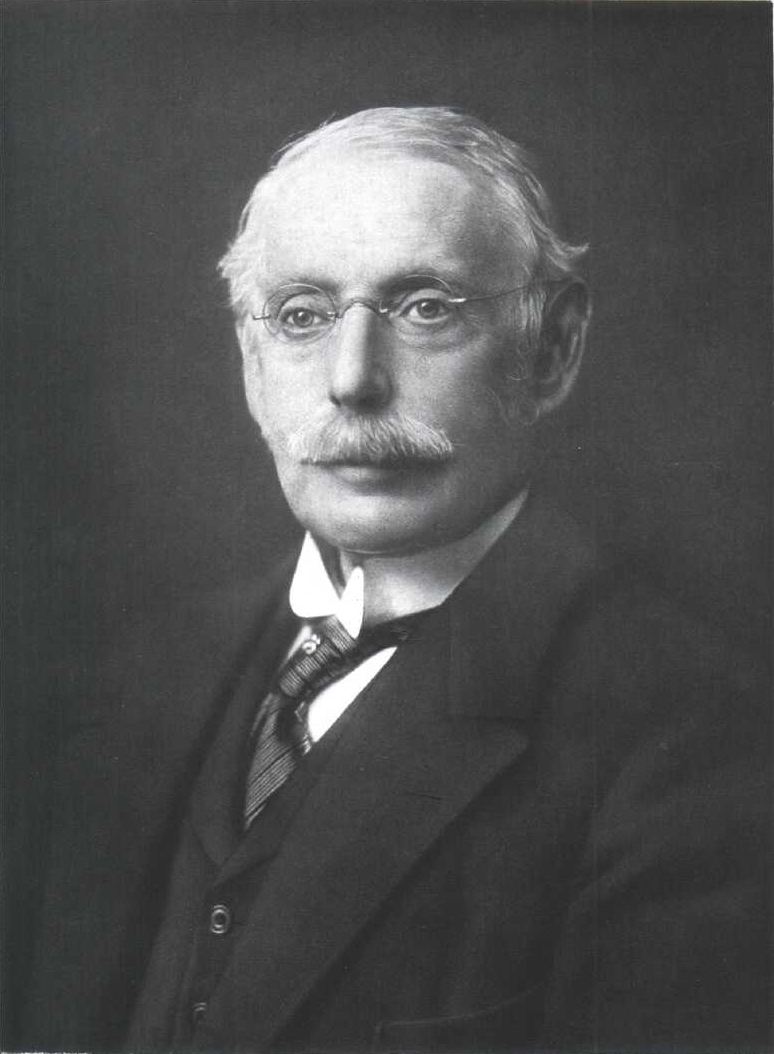
Charles A. Parsons

The modern steam turbine, invented by Charles A. Parsons in 1884, overcomes these problems by having only rotating parts, and no reciprocating parts. In 1894 he formed a syndicate to build a small experimental steam launch, Turbinia. In a famous publicity stunt, Parson's steam launch sped uninvited past warships in the Solent at the 1897 Review of the Fleet held on the Diamond Jubilee of Queen Victoria's accession to the throne. Turbinia raced past them at the unheard-of speed of 34 knots (63 km/h; 39 mph), far outstripping the ships of the Royal Navy sent to intercept. In January 1898 the Admiralty ordered a turbine-powered destroyer, Viper, and later that year a typical lightly built destroyer being built as a private venture was fitted with turbines. The Admiralty purchased this ship after requiring strengthening of the hull, and named the vessel HMS Cobra. Both destroyers were launched in 1899, and both were soon lost for reasons unrelated to their machinery, and before the Admiralty could obtain substantial experience with turbine propulsion.

Such experience was needed before the turbine could obtain wide acceptance, as there had been problems in its development. The reciprocating steam engine, for all its theoretical faults, had been perfected over eight decades of development. Its manufacturing and operating characteristics were widely known; it had attained a high degree of fuel efficiency, and functioned economically across a range of speeds. In contrast, the turbine was new; the seagoing prototype Turbinia experienced engine problems in its expensive development; and its theoretical advantage in low vibrations had not been realised, as turbine blades had failed due to vibrations, as well as contacting the casing, leading to catastrophic destruction within the turbines. In short, it was an expensive and unproven technology.

From a records of a later discussion, it appears that Archibald Denny, a partner in the shipbuilders William Denny and Brothers, had already been impressed by a technical paper by Parsons and had approached him with the suggestion of using steam turbines to power a merchant vessel. Denny apparently invited Clyde railway steamboat owners to sponsor the venture, but nothing came of these exploratory informal approaches. It was left to one of the owners of private steamer fleets to take on this challenge.

== Turbine syndicate ==
Captain John Williamson had followed his father Captain James Williamson in owning and running Clyde Steamers, purchasing his first ship in 1893 and buying and selling ships to build up a fleet. These included the PS Strathmore, built to order in 1897, which took over the service running from Fairlie Pier railway station to Campbeltown, and proved reliable. He seems to have given independent consideration to introducing a turbine steamer, and agreed to take this on. Towards the end of 1900 a syndicate was formed in which he agreed to personally operate the proposed ship for its first season without pay, William Denny and Brothers would build the hull and boilers, and the Parsons Marine Steam Turbine Company was to provide the machinery. Each member of the syndicate provided one third of the cost of the vessel, estimated at £33,000 (equivalent to £3,507,000 in 2025), plus £267 (equivalent to £28,400 in 2025) towards initial working and running expenses. On 22 January 1901 the Glasgow and South Western Railway minuted an agreement in its official records, backing this improvement to a service from its railway terminal into areas which its act of Parliament prohibited its own vessels from serving:

Fairlie and Campbeltown Steamboat Service – Captain John Williamson, having represented that he had arranged with others for the building of a steamer with Parsons turbine engines and Propellors–It was agreed to guarantee his overdraft with the National Bank of Scotland conditionally on Captain Williamson placing and maintaining the Steamer on the Fairlie route next summer.

== Design ==
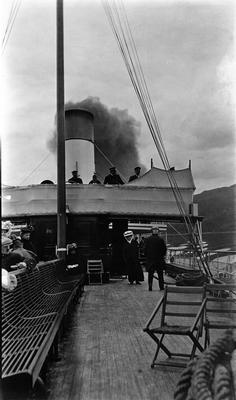
Foredeck, with pilothouse and bridge

The hull design of King Edward was closely based by Denny on its successful steamer, PS Duchess of Hamilton, and shared the main dimensions. The hull was 250 feet 6 inches (76.35 m) long and 30.1 ft (9.2 m) in breadth. Depth was about 10 ft 6 in (3.20 m) and the vessel drew about 7 ft (2.1 m) of water. Tonnage was measured at 502 gross and 182 net. The ship accommodated 1,966 passengers.

The machinery was amidships down in the hull, with a lower deck fore and aft, the crew's quarters being located towards the bow. A full-length main deck was above, enclosed almost to the stern, with circular portholes over much of the length and larger rectangular windows aft. First-class accommodations were aft, and second-class fore, with dining saloons for each class on the lower deck. The superstructure or promenade deck was open, save for a pilothouse and bridge, a house around the uptakes, and a small house just aft of amidships. The promenade deck planking showed provision for conversion to paddle propulsion, in case the turbines proved a failure. Uniquely at that time, a short flying deck supported the two funnels, and a lifeboat on each side of the funnels.

The power plant consisted of Scotch marine boilers providing steam at 150 pounds per square inch (1,000 kPa) to Parsons turbines. Steam first drove a high-pressure turbine, which turned a propeller shaft with a 57-inch (1,400 mm) screw at up to 700 revolutions per minute. Exhaust steam from the centre turbine drove two low-pressure turbines, one on either side, turning wing shafts each with two 40-inch (1,000 mm) propellers, at up to 1,000 rpm. (In 1905, the fore propellers were removed from the outboard shafts, which actually improved performance). The drives were ungeared, and the speeds of the turbines were the speeds of the shafts. After final use in the lower-pressure outboard turbines, the steam, now expanded 125-fold, exhausted into condensers. Astern turbines operated on the two wing shafts, with the central shaft idling when the ship was backing. The aim was for a speed of 20 knots (37 km/h; 23 mph), outpacing other Clyde steamers while providing economy in fuel, rather than the high speeds of the navy vessels. The propulsion system differed from that of the lightly built destroyers, which operated under higher steam pressure and drove four propeller shafts. Denny gave the new ship the yard number 651.

== Launch and trials, performance ==
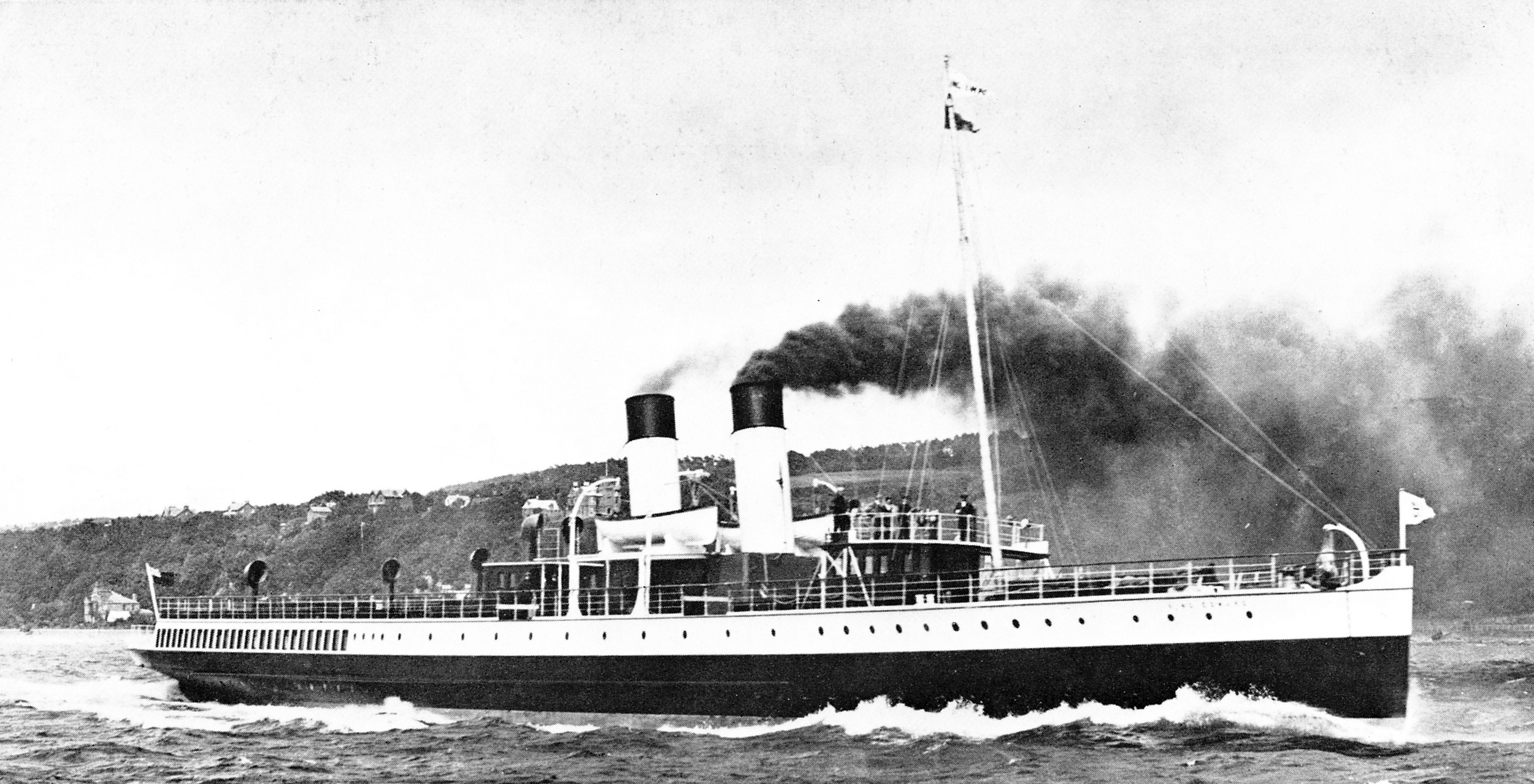
TS King Edward on trials in the Firth of Clyde off Skelmorlie, between 17 and 28 June 1901

On 16 May 1901 the vessel was launched by Mrs. Parsons, who named the ship King Edward by royal permission. The ship's colours were those of Captain John Williamson – black hull, white saloons and white funnels with a black top, flying the well remembered "star and crescent" pennant of the old "Turkish fleet" of Clyde steamers.

The builders had tested the hull form in their own tank, and hoped to attain a speed of 20 knots (37 km/h; 23 mph) with the turbine machinery. On 14 June the first steam trial was supervised personally by C. A. Parsons and John Williamson, then on 17 June during manoeuvring trials in calm weather the mean speed of two runs over the measured mile at Skelmorlie was 18.66 knots (34.56 km/h; 21.47 mph). After full hull cleaning at Scott's of Greenock a further series of trials took place on 24 June: in seven return runs over the mile, the best mean speed attained was 19.7 knots (36.5 km/h; 22.7 mph). On the next day at the Pointhouse yard of A. & J. Inglis the central propeller of 4 ft (1.2 m) diameter was exchanged for one of 4 ft 9 in (1.45 m) diameter, and the outer propellers of 2 ft 10 in (0.86 m) diameter were exchanged for propellers 3 ft 4 in (1.02 m) diameter. Trials on 26 June with smooth sea conditions and a light breeze achieved a mean of 20.48 knots (37.93 km/h; 23.57 mph) and a fastest single run at 20.57 knots (38.10 km/h; 23.67 mph). At the official trial on 28 June, invited guests came aboard off Craigendoran, and the ship then sailed to Campbeltown with intermediate visits to Dunoon, Rothesay, Largs, Fairlie and Lochranza, where Duchess of Hamilton waited with a special party of members of the Institute of Naval Architects. The two ships raced down Kilbrannan Sound and King Edward passed the paddle steamer without difficulty. A dinner in the after saloon was presided over by Peter Denny, who with other speakers commented on the speed and smoothness of the turbine steamer, in contrast to the rhythmic surging motion and vibration associated with all paddle steamers.

The machinery developed 3,500 indicated horsepower and 399 nominal horsepower. King Edward's performance was compared with that of Duchess of Hamilton, the similar vessel built by Denny at about the same time, but with reciprocating machinery driving paddle wheels. In actual service on the Firth the turbine vessel averaged 18.5 knots (34.3 km/h; 21.3 mph), about two knots (3.7 km/h; 2.3 mph) faster than Duchess of Hamilton. In 1902 James Denny compared the 20.5 knots (38.0 km/h; 23.6 mph) achieved on trial with an estimated maximum using the most modern triple expansion reciprocating engines of 19.7 knots, which would have involved considerably increased initial and fuel costs, and said that this showed the turbines giving a 20% increase in power. He said that fuel efficiency of King Edward had been found to increase in proportion to speed, and was best when the turbines were worked at full capacity. The ship burned more coal per knot of speed than reciprocating-engined steamers only when operating at a lower speed range of between 17 and 18 knots (31 and 33 km/h; 20 and 21 mph), corresponding to around 50% of maximum power output.

== Career ==
King Edward entered service on 1 July 1901, with a daily sailing leaving the Glasgow and South Western Railway's Prince's Pier, Greenock, at an advertised time of 8.40 a.m., visiting Dunoon and Rothesay before calling at the G&SWR's Fairlie Pier railway station at 10.20 a.m. then sailing across the Firth to Lochranza and on to arrive at Campbeltown at 12.20. For a small additional cost, horse-drawn coach trips from Campbeltown to Machrihanish offered a "Daily Excursion to the Shores of the Atlantic". On the return voyage, the ship left Campbeltown at 3 p.m. and passengers could catch a train at the railway pier to arrive back at 6.18 p.m. at St Enoch railway station, Glasgow. The G&SWR also offered an Isle of Arran tour, taking PS Juno from Prince's Pier via the Kyles of Bute to Brodick, then travelling by coach to Lochranza to catch King Edward for the return voyage, or a similar arrangement in reverse order. In July 1901 a novel evening cruise was introduced, with trains leaving Glasgow at 6.50 p.m. and meeting King Edward at Greenock for a cruise of about two hours "with music on board", after which a train returned, to be back at 10.25 p.m. in Glasgow. The ship proved very popular, attracting passengers by the novelty of turbine sailing aided by splendid summer weather and additional traffic from the Glasgow International Exhibition of 1901, and the season was extended to the end of September, then the ship was laid up for the winter.

Both of the steam turbine destroyers were wrecked in 1901. On 3 August HMS Viper ran aground on a reef and became a total loss. On 17 September in heavy weather HMS Cobra broke in two and sank rapidly. The crew was accompanied by many Parsons personnel, and only 12 survived of the 79 on board. This left King Edward as the only surviving turbine steamship and raised questions over turbine propulsion, but the losses were soon attributed to weakness in the lightly constructed hulls of the destroyers.

The season's sailings of King Edward were so successful that the overdraft was cleared. Meeting the terms of the agreement between the syndicate members, the newly formed company Turbine Steamers, Ltd. acquired the ship. Captain John Williamson, who became managing director as well as having substantial holdings in the company, immediately ordered a new ship. On 3 October he accepted the offer of Denny's dated two days earlier to build an enlarged King Edward for £38,500 (equivalent to £4,091,000 in 2025),, incorporating turbine machinery which Mr. Parson agreed to supply to Denny's for £10,500 (equivalent to £1,116,000 in 2025),. The new turbine vessel was launched on 8 April 1902 as TS Queen Alexandra, and after an initial cruise on 31 May, took over the Campbeltown run on 2 June. King Edward began a new service from Prince's Pier to Fairlie and on up Loch Fyne to Tarbert and Ardrishaig. In 1904 this route was extended to Inveraray, competing with MacBrayne's paddle steamers Columba and Iona, and Lord of the Isles run by the Inveraray Company.

In the winter of 1905–1906 King Edward was altered to add a cloakroom and a smokeroom on the main deck, under a new top deck extending aft over the saloon staircase but not forward to the bridge. The ship's boats were relocated at the after end of this new deck, so that they no longer obstructed the view of the funnels from each side. After a "Grand Saturday afternoon opening cruise to Kilbrannan Sound" on 12 May 1906, the ship resumed the run from Greenock to Inveraray. The route was changed so that instead of going via Fairlie and Garroch Head, the ship went through the Kyles of Bute and gave direct competition to the other steamers on the run. The timetable of Lord of the Isles was accelerated as much as it could, and the steerage fare cut to 3 shillings and 6 d (equivalent to £18.40 in 2025), against the turbine steamer fare of 5 shillings (equivalent to £26.28 in 2025), but the paddle steamer still lost traffic. King Edward always reached Inveraray first, and refused to leave the berth to allow the paddler in. An attempt to get Inveraray Town Council to intervene failed as the vote was tied with 6 on each side, and the provost declined to settle the matter with a casting vote. By 1912 the battle was over, and Lord of the Isles (together with the paddler Edinburgh Castle which was also owned by an amalgamation of the Inveraray and Loch Goil companies) was taken over by Turbine Steamers Ltd.

During the Great War, King Edward ferried troops across the English Channel. On its return voyage after serving on the White Sea, the ship survived a terrible storm. After the war the ship returned to the former service, switching to the Glasgow–Rothesay route in 1927. A merger of shipowners in 1919 had formed Williamson-Buchanan Steamers Ltd. which still traded as John Williamson and Company and retained as standard white funnels with black tops. In 1927, King Edward was transferred to this fleet for "all the way" sailings from Glasgow. Sailings included trips via Rothesay through the Kyles of Bute, and Sunday afternoon trips to Lochgoilhead which left Glasgow at 2.15 and arrived back at 9.30. The "first cabin" fare, with cooked high tea, was 5 shillings and 6 pence. At the end of the 1935 season the London, Midland and Scottish Railway took over the company, maintaining the same colour scheme. The company remained a separate entity until it was wound up in 1943.

In World War II King Edward ran for a time on the peacetime route, then became a tender for troopships arriving at the Clyde. After the war the vessel resumed the Rothesay route, now with yellow funnels, until withdrawn in 1951 after some 50 years of service. The ship was broken up in 1952, but its turbine engines were saved and displayed in the Glasgow Transport Museum.

== Influence ==
King Edward's performance "revolutionised the world of excursion steamers." The vessel demonstrated the ability of steam turbines to drive ships at high speed, without the vibrations inherent in reciprocating steam plants. This success led almost immediately to orders for several other turbine Clyde steamers, and other vessels for short-sea trades across the Irish Sea and English Channel.

Although some mariners questioned the advisability of turbine propulsion for larger ships, King Edward's performance led the Allan Line to order turbine machinery from Parsons for new transatlantic liners Victorian and Virginian, both launched in 1904. And within five years of King Edward's maiden voyage, the reliability and superiority of turbine power had been sufficiently well-established that the Cunard Line, supported by the British government, specified turbine propulsion for the ocean liners Lusitania and Mauretania, which were vastly larger than King Edward.

== See also ==
- List of ships built by William Denny and Brothers
