= SS Canadian =

Iron-hulled passenger ship

History
- Name: Canadian
- Owner: Allan Line
- Port of registry: Glasgow
- Builder: R Steele & Co, Greenock
- Yard number: 21
- Launched: 10 December 1859
- Completed: March 1860
- Identification: UK official number 28222
- Fate: Sunk by striking an iceberg, 4 June 1861

General characteristics
- Type: Passenger ship
- Tonnage: 1,926 GRT, 1,310 NRT
- Length: 301.6 ft (91.9 m)
- Beam: 35.9 ft (10.9 m)
- Depth: 16.6 ft (5.1 m)
- Decks: 2
- Installed power: 1 x compound engine
- Propulsion: 1 × screw
- Speed: 14 knots (26 km/h)
- Capacity: 75 x 1st class; 300 3rd class
- Crew: 60

SS Canadian was an iron-hulled passenger ship that sank by striking an iceberg in the Strait of Belle Isle while she was sailing from Quebec in Canada to Liverpool in the United Kingdom in 1861. 35 out of 301 persons aboard the ship were killed in the disaster.

== Building ==
Canadian was launched on 10 December 1859 and completed in March 1860 at the Robert Steele & Company shipyard in Greenock, Scotland for the Allan Line. Her registered length was 301.6 ft (91.9 m), her beam was 35.9 ft (10.9 m), and her depth was 16.6 ft (5.1 m). She had berths for 375 passengers: 75 in first class, and 300 in third class. Her tonnages were 1,926 GRT and 1,310 NRT. She had a single screw, driven by a two-cylinder compound engine that gave her a speed of 14 knots (26 km/h).

== Loss ==
On 4 June 1861, Canadian left Quebec, Canada for Liverpool, England, with 60 crew and 241 passengers aboard. When she sailed through the Strait of Belle Isle, ice and thick weather started to form. Her Captain ordered to slow the ship to 5 knots (9 km/h) while passing through the ice. At 11:50 hrs she struck an iceberg, which was largely underwater, 4 nautical miles (7.4 km) north of Cape Bauld, at position 51°30′N 55°30′W.

The ship's three compartments quickly flooded. Since the collision was at such a low speed, and most passengers were preparing for lunch, most passengers did not know anything was wrong until they noticed that the crew, on order of the captain, were preparing the lifeboats to be lowered. The ship was sinking quickly, so the crew worked very quickly to evacuate everyone. All the lifeboats were safely launched except No. 8, which capsized when being lowered, killing at least 30 people. The ship sank about a half-hour after striking the iceberg. Some passengers and crew did not board a lifeboat, and went down with the ship. In total 35 people were killed in the disaster.

Among the dead was mail officer James Panton, who is considered to be one a hero of the sinking. He guided many people to the lifeboats, and even saved some of his mailbags. He also gave up his seat in a lifeboat for a female passenger. Mr. Panton was last seen hanging by a rope over the side of the ship as she sank. The 266 survivors were soon rescued by four French fishing vessels, and taken to Quirpon Bay.

== Bibliography ==
- Haws, Duncan (1979). The Ships of the Union, Castle, Union-Castle, Allan and Canadian Pacific lines. Merchant Fleets in Profile. Vol. 3. Cambridge: Patrick Stephens Ltd. ISBN 0-85059-352-2.
