= RMS Victorian =

Ship built in 1904

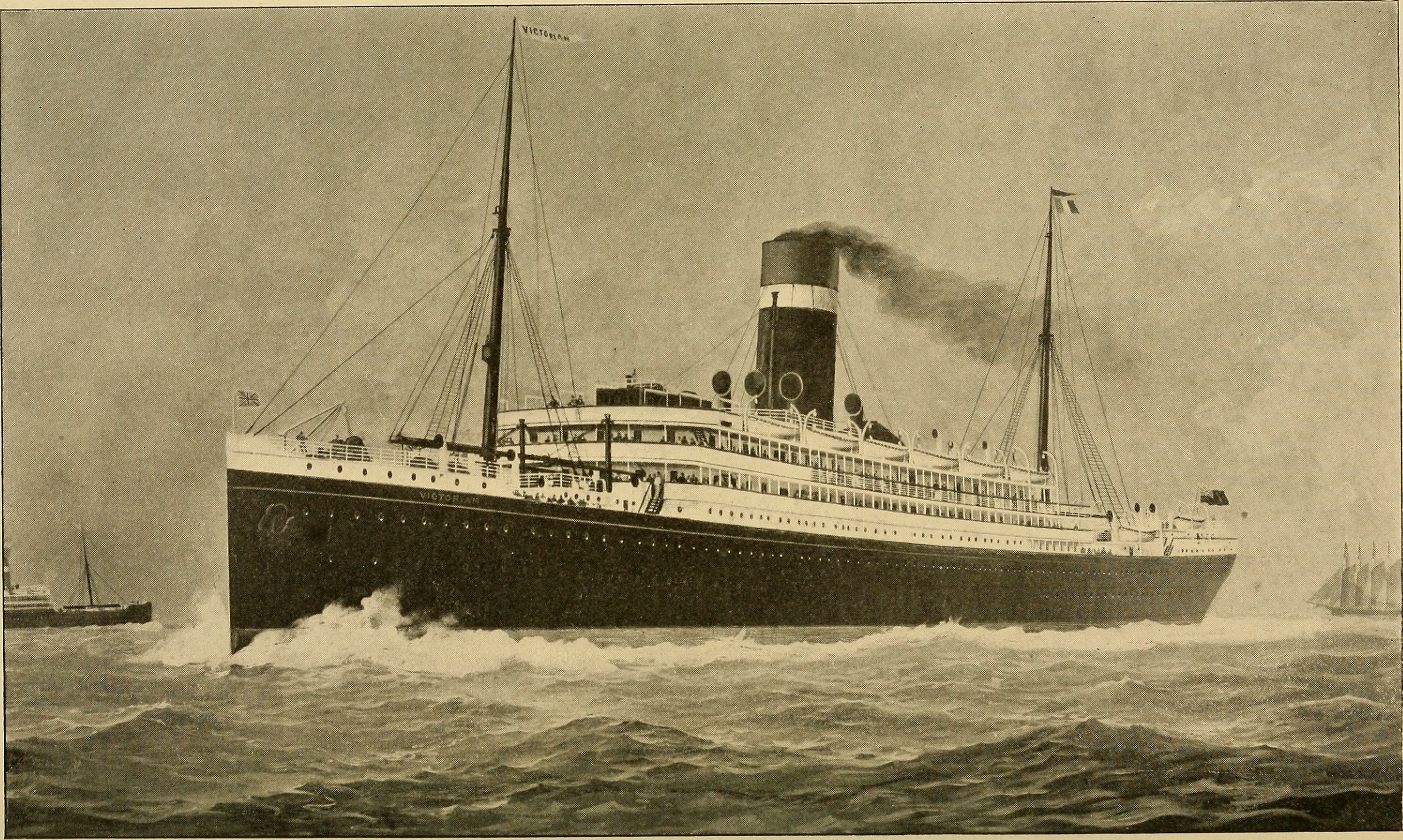
- Victorian in a 1904 magazine illustration

History

United Kingdom
- Name: Victorian (1904–22); Marloch (1922–29)
- Owner: Allan Line (1905–17); Canadian Pacific (1917–29)
- Operator: Allan Line (1904–09); Allan Bros & Co (UK) Ltd (1909–14); (United Kingdom) Royal Navy (1914–18); Canadian Pacific (1920–29)
- Port of registry: (United Kingdom) Glasgow
- Route: Liverpool – Montreal
- Ordered: October 1903
- Builder: Workman, Clark and Company
- Yard number: 206
- Launched: 25 August 1904
- Completed: March 1905
- Maiden voyage: 23 March 1905
- Refit: 1919, re-engined 1922
- Identification: UK official number 121216; Code letters HCFM; Wireless call sign: MVN; Pennant number (as AMC): M 56 (August 1914 – January 1918); MI 91 (January – April 1918); MI 51 (April – November 1918)
- Fate: Scrapped 1929

General characteristics
- Type: Ocean liner
- Tonnage: 10,629 GRT 6,744 NRT
- Length: 520.0 ft (158.5 m)
- Beam: 60.4 ft (18.4 m)
- Draught: 26 ft 11 in (8.2 m) forward; 29 ft 5 in (9.0 m) aft
- Depth: 38.0 ft (11.6 m)
- Decks: 3
- Installed power: 12,000 SHP
- Propulsion: Steam turbines, three Propellers
- Speed: 19.5 knots (36.1 km/h)
- Capacity: as built: 470 1st class; 240 2nd class; 940 3rd class; cargo: 8,000 tons
- Armament: as Armed merchant cruiser: primary armament: August 1914 – June 1915: 8 × QF 4.7-inch guns; June 1915 – November 1918: 6 × BL 6-inch & QF 6-inch naval guns; secondary armament: June 1915 – May 1916: 2 × 6-pdr guns; May 1916 – November 1918: 2 × AA guns; by October 1916: Depth charges
- Notes: Sister ship: RMS Virginian

RMS Victorian was the world's first turbine-powered ocean liner. She was designed as a transatlantic liner and mail ship for Allan Line and launched in 1904.

Victorian was built in Belfast. She had a sister ship, RMS Virginian, which was built in Scotland and launched four months later.

Throughout the First World War Victorian was an armed merchant cruiser (AMC). In 1918 she also carried cargo and troops.

In 1920, she returned to civilian service with the Canadian Pacific Steamship Company, but in 1921, the British Government chartered her as a troop ship. In 1922, Canadian Pacific renamed her Marloch. She was scrapped in 1929 after a quarter of a century of successful service.

== Background ==
Charles Parsons had demonstrated the speed of his marine steam turbines in Turbinia launched in 1894 and their reliability in the Clyde excursion steamer King Edward launched in 1901. But King Edward's fuel costs were higher than those of her reciprocating-engined and as a result so were her fares. Passengers accepted the higher cost on King Edward's day trips down the Clyde, but ocean liner companies did not know whether passengers, cargo customers and post offices would accept the higher cost on Atlantic crossings lasting several days.

Canadian Pacific entered the North Atlantic Trade by buying Elder Dempster Lines' Beaver Line subsidiary early in 1903. Allan Line responded by ordering a pair of new express liners. Allan Line originally planned to order conventional twin-screw ships with reciprocating steam engines, but in October 1903 it announced that it had ordered a pair of ships with turbines driving three screws as on King Edward.

On 28 January 1904, seven months before Victorian was launched, the Government of Canada announced it had awarded Allan Line a transatlantic mail contract. Four Allan Line ships were to provide a regular scheduled service: the 10,576 GRT liners Bavarian and Tunisian, and the new Victorian and Virginian. The subsidy would be $5,000 per trip for Bavarian and Tunisian, and $10,000 per trip for each of the new turbine ships.

== Design ==
Victorian's propulsion system was a scaled-up version of King Edward's. She had three screws. Victorian's Scotch marine boilers had coal-fired furnaces whose smoke was exhausted through a large single funnel. Her boilers fed steam at 180 pounds per square inch (12 bar) to the high-pressure Parsons turbine driving her centre shaft. Exhaust steam from the high-pressure turbine drove the low-pressure Parsons turbines on her port and starboard (wing) shafts. All three screws were driven directly at turbine speed.

Victorian was 520.0 ft (158.5 m) long, her beam was 60.4 ft (18.4 m) and her depth was 38.0 ft (11.6 m). Her tonnages were 10,629 GRT and 6,744 NRT. She had orlop decks fore and aft of her machinery spaces, and three full decks in her hull with berths for 240 second-class passengers on the main and upper deck and up to 940 in third class. Atop the hull, her forecastle was followed by forward holds, a long superstructure with cabins and public saloons for 470 first-class passengers on the bridge and promenade decks, an after hold, and a poop deck. Her holds had space for 8,000 tons of cargo and included refrigerated space for perishable produce.

== Building and performance ==
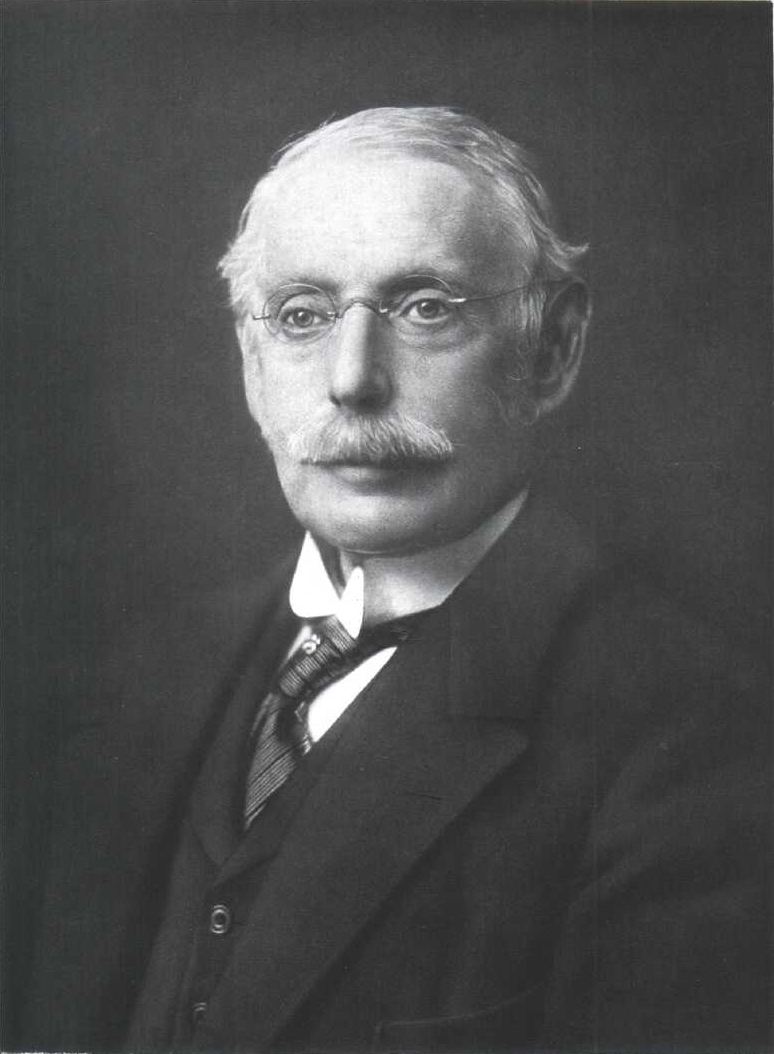
Despite unsatisfactory initial sea trials, Charles Parsons correctly predicted that Victorian and her sister would be a success

Workman, Clark and Company built Victorian in Belfast, launching her on 25 August 1904. On 5 December it was reported that on sea trials she had failed to reach the 17 knots (31 km/h) Allan Line had stipulated in her contract, and as a result John Brown & Company and Swan, Hunter & Wigham Richardson had suspended building of the much larger turbine ships RMS Lusitania and Mauretania for Cunard Line. However, there were conflicting reports as to whether Victorian's initial failure was caused by a shortcoming of her turbines or the design of her hull.

On 16 January 1905, in an address to the Institute of Marine Engineers, Parsons confidently predicted that turbines would supersede reciprocating engines in ships of more than 16 knots (30 km/h) and more than 5,000 IHP, and would probably be adopted for ships above 13 knots (24 km/h) and 2,000 GRT.

On 16 March, it was reported that Victorian had achieved 19.5 knots (36 km/h) on sea trials on the Firth of Clyde, with her turbines developing some 12,000 shaft horsepower and turning the screws at 260 RPM. She entered service a week later, and before the end of the year had set an eastbound record of five days and five hours from Rimouski in Quebec to Moville in Ireland, which stood for some time.

== Allan Line service ==
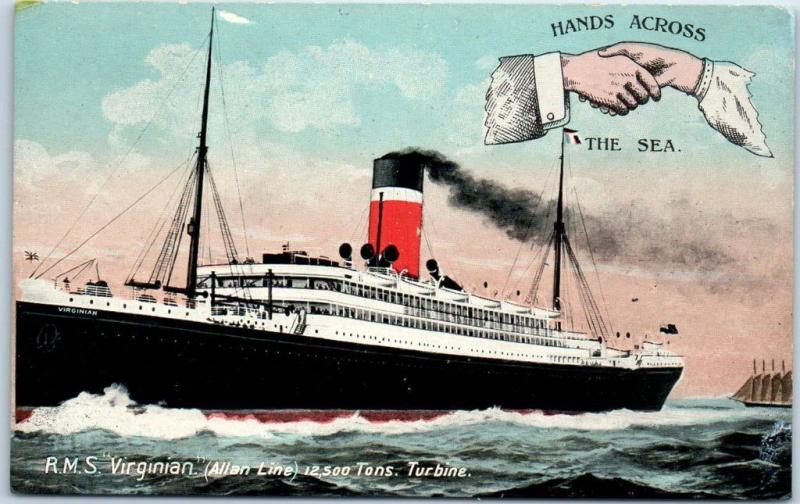
Victorian's sister ship Virginian

On 23 March 1905, Victorian began her maiden voyage from Liverpool to Canada. Two days of bad weather prevented her from breaking any record, but she reached Halifax, Nova Scotia via Moville at noon on 1 April after a crossing of seven days and 22 hours. A fortnight later, on 6 April, her sister ship Virginian joined her on the route. The pair were a commercial success, and after some adjustments to her machinery, they maintained a regular transatlantic service between Britain, Ireland and Canada until August 1914.

On 1 September 1905, Victorian was reported to have run aground at Cape St. Charles, Labrador on an eastbound crossing, as dense smoke from forest fires had impaired navigation. She had 19 feet (6 m) of water in her number two hold, her 350 passengers were taken off to continue their journey on Allan Line's 10,576 GRT liner Bavarian a week later, and her mails were taken off and sent eastbound via New York.

On a westbound voyage on the morning of 11 August 1911, 57 of the stewards of Victorian's first and second class dining saloons refused an instruction to help put ashore mail at Rimouski. The stewards later agreed to obey the instruction, but then refused to serve breakfast or lunch to the passengers. When Victorian reached Montreal that evening five Montreal Police vehicles met the ship and officers arrested all 57 stewards for mutiny. Allan Line suggested that the incident could be linked with the ongoing Liverpool transport strike that had begun on 14 June.

By 1912, Victorian was equipped for wireless telegraphy, operating on the 300 and 600 metre wavelengths. Her call sign was MVN.

When RMS Titanic sank on 15 April 1912 Victorian was about 300 nautical miles (560 km) astern of her, travelling in the same direction. Victorian's wireless operator received news of the sinking "from RMS Carpathia via RMS Baltic". The operator told Victorian's Master, Captain Outram, but her passengers were not told until she reached Halifax. Outram said that Victorian had to divert "very far south" to avoid icebergs, and that his lookouts saw a great field of ice and 13 icebergs at one time.

== First World War ==
On 28 July 1914, the First World War began. The British Admiralty had been converting passenger liners into armed merchant cruisers since shortly before the war, and on 6 August listed eight more to be requisitioned, including Victorian. She was at Quebec that day and was detained accordingly. But she seems to have been allowed to proceed to Liverpool in civilian service, as she was requisitioned on 17 August, and was commissioned at Chatham Dockyard on 21 August. Initially her armament was eight 4.7-inch QF guns: two on her forecastle, two on her forward house, two on her after house and two on her poop deck. Her pennant number was M 56.

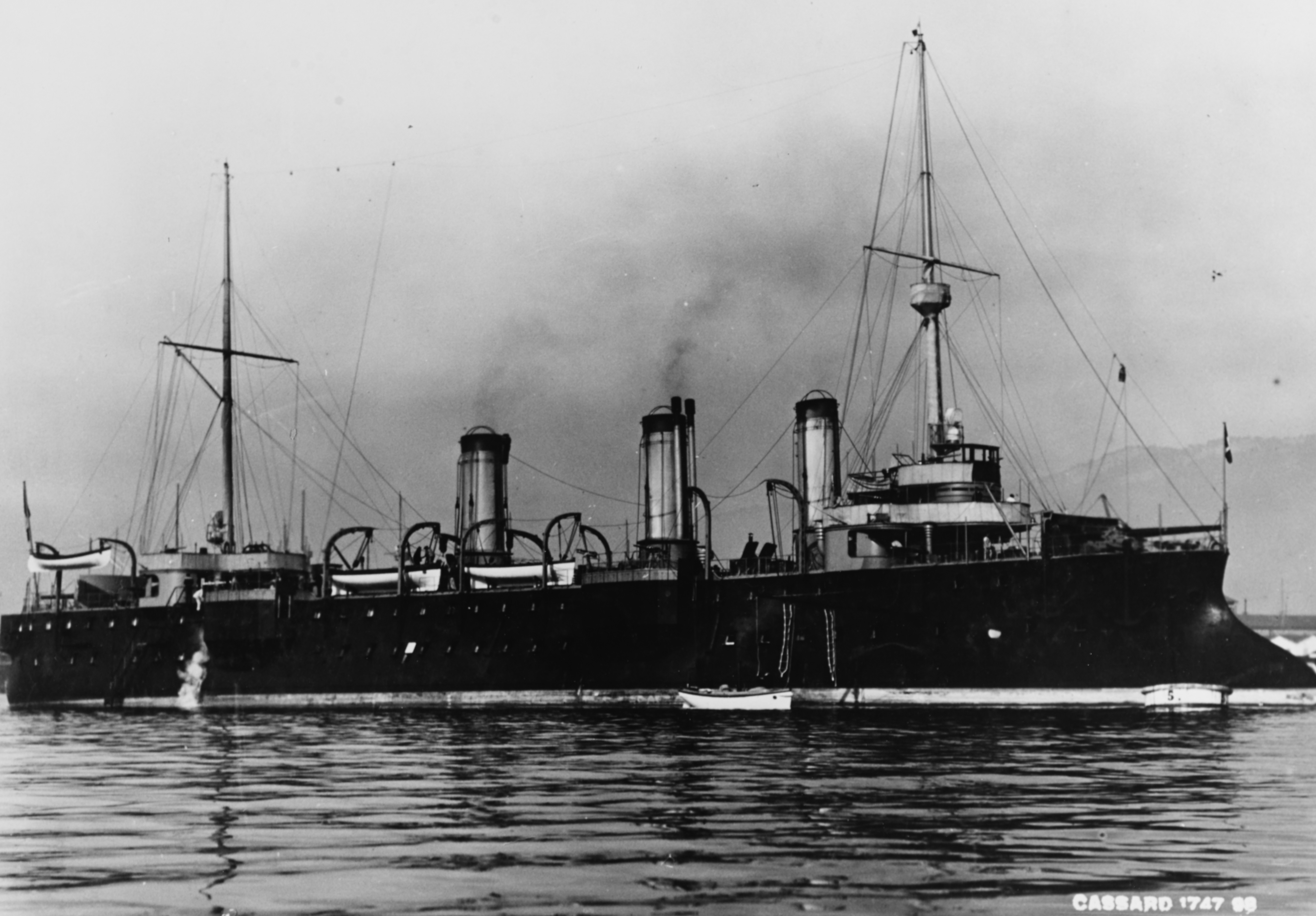
The French cruiser Cassard, with which Victorian bombarded Moroccan villages in September 1914

Victorian served with the 9th Cruiser Squadron from September 1914 until March 1915. In September 1914, she was ordered to the coast of Morocco, which France had invaded in 1907 and forced to become a French protectorate in 1912. Victorian joined the French cruiser Cassard off Cape Juby on 26 September, the two cruisers bombarded Moroccan villages the next day, and Victorian withdrew on 28 September.

From October 1914 until January 1915, Victorian patrolled near the Canary Islands. She called at Freetown in Sierra Leone on 23–24 November. She patrolled the coast of Portugal in February, returned to home waters in March and was out of commission in April and May.

In June 1915, Cammell Laird replaced Victorian's forecastle guns with two six-pounder guns that had been removed from HMS Caribbean, an RMSP liner that had briefly been an AMC but had then been deemed unsuitable. At about the same time Victorian's other six 4.7-inch guns were replaced with six BL 6-inch and QF 6-inch naval guns. Also in June 1915, Victorian joined the 10th Cruiser Squadron.

With the 10th Cruiser Squadron Victorian was on the Northern Patrol from June 1915 until July 1917. Her patrols took her to the Norwegian Sea in 1915, around the Faroe Islands and the northern part of the Western Approaches in 1916 and the same plus the Icelandic coast of the Denmark Strait in the first half of 1917.

In May 1916, the two six-pounders were removed from her forecastle and replaced with a pair of anti-aircraft guns. By October 1916, her armament also included depth charges.

From August 1917 until November 1918 Victorian escorted convoys. In 1918 her pennant number was changed twice: to MI 91 in January and to MI 51 in April. From January 1918 she carried cargo and from April she carried troops, including US Army and Australian Army.

On 4 November 1918 Victorian arrived in the River Mersey to be decommissioned from the Royal Navy. Her guns were removed on 27 November and her unused ammunition was unloaded on 27–29 November.

== Canadian Pacific service ==
Canadian Pacific had taken over Allan Line in 1917. Cammell, Laird refitted Victorian for civilian service, and on 13 April 1920 she resumed her old route between Liverpool, Quebec and Montreal.

In 1921, the UK government chartered Victorian as a troop ship to India. In 1922, the Fairfield Shipbuilding and Engineering Company converted her to oil-burning and replaced her original direct-drive turbines with new ones with single-reduction gearing, and Canadian Pacific renamed her Marloch.

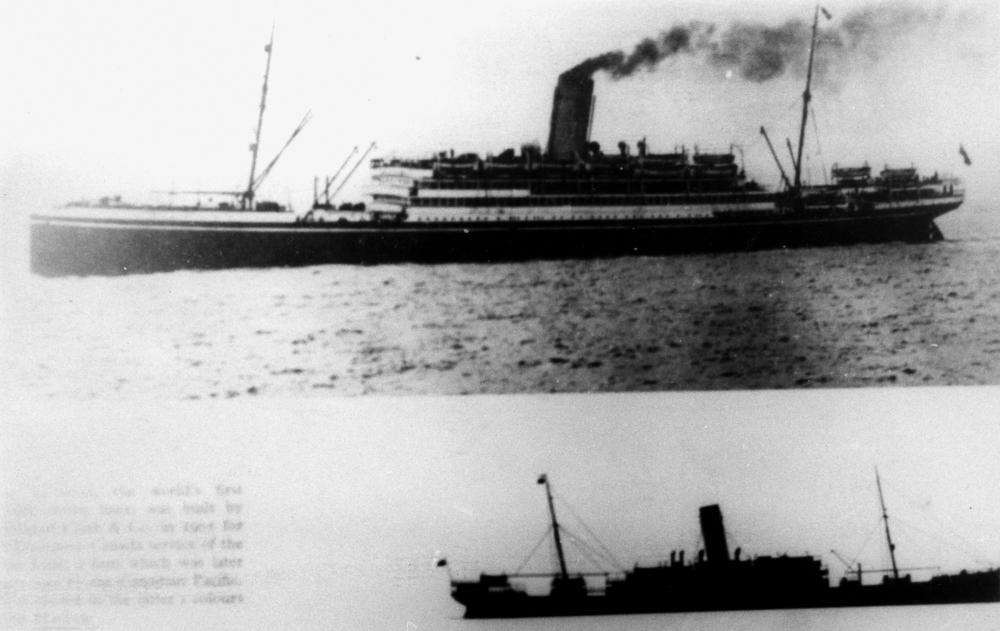
Marloch in the 1920s

In the mid-1920s, Canadian Pacific put Marloch in reserve, but she often saw service.

On 26 June 1925, Marloch was in the Saint Lawrence River at Quebec when the tug Ocean King approached to receive a hawser and tow her. Ocean King crossed Marloch's bow too close and the liner rammed the tug. Ocean King capsized, the cold water of the river caused her boilers to explode, and all nine crew of the tug were killed.

On 3 February 1926, in fog in the Scheldt off Vlissingen, Marloch collided with the 1,655 GRT UK cargo ship Whimbrel, which was holed on her starboard quarter and sank. Marloch was damaged and was towed to Southampton for repair.

On 19 September 1928, Marloch was laid up at Southend-on-Sea. On 17 April 1929, Canadian Pacific sold her to Thos. W. Ward Ltd, who scrapped her at either Milford Haven or Pembroke Dock.

== Bibliography ==
- Baker, WA; Tryckare, Tre (1965). The Engine Powered Vessel. New York: Grosset & Dunlap.
- Corbett, Julian S (1920). Naval Operations. History of the Great War. Vol. I: To The Battle of the Falklands December 1914. London: Longmans, Green & Co.
- Dittmar, FJ; Colledge, JJ (1972). British Warships 1914–1919. Shepperton: Ian Allan. ISBN 0-7110-0380-7.
- Harnack, Edwin P (1930) [1903]. All About Ships & Shipping (3rd ed.). London: Faber and Faber.
- McCrorie, Ian (1986). Clyde Pleasure Steamers: An Illustrated History. Greenock: Orr, Pollock. ISBN 1-869850-00-9.
- Maber, John M (1980). Channel packets and ocean liners, 1850–1970. The Ship. Vol. 6. Edinburgh: HMSO. ISBN 0-11-290316-9.
- Thomas, Stuart; Smith, Kay (eds.). "HMS Victorian – August 1914 to November 1918, Canary Islands area, 10th CS Northern Patrol, North Atlantic convoys". Royal Navy Log Books of the World War 1 Era. Naval History.Net.
- The Marconi Press Agency Ltd (1913). The Year Book of Wireless Telegraphy and Telephony. London: The St Katherine Press.
- Wilson, RM (1956). The Big Ships. London: Cassell & Co.
