= Jack Phillips (wireless operator) =

RMS Titanic wireless operator (1887–1912)

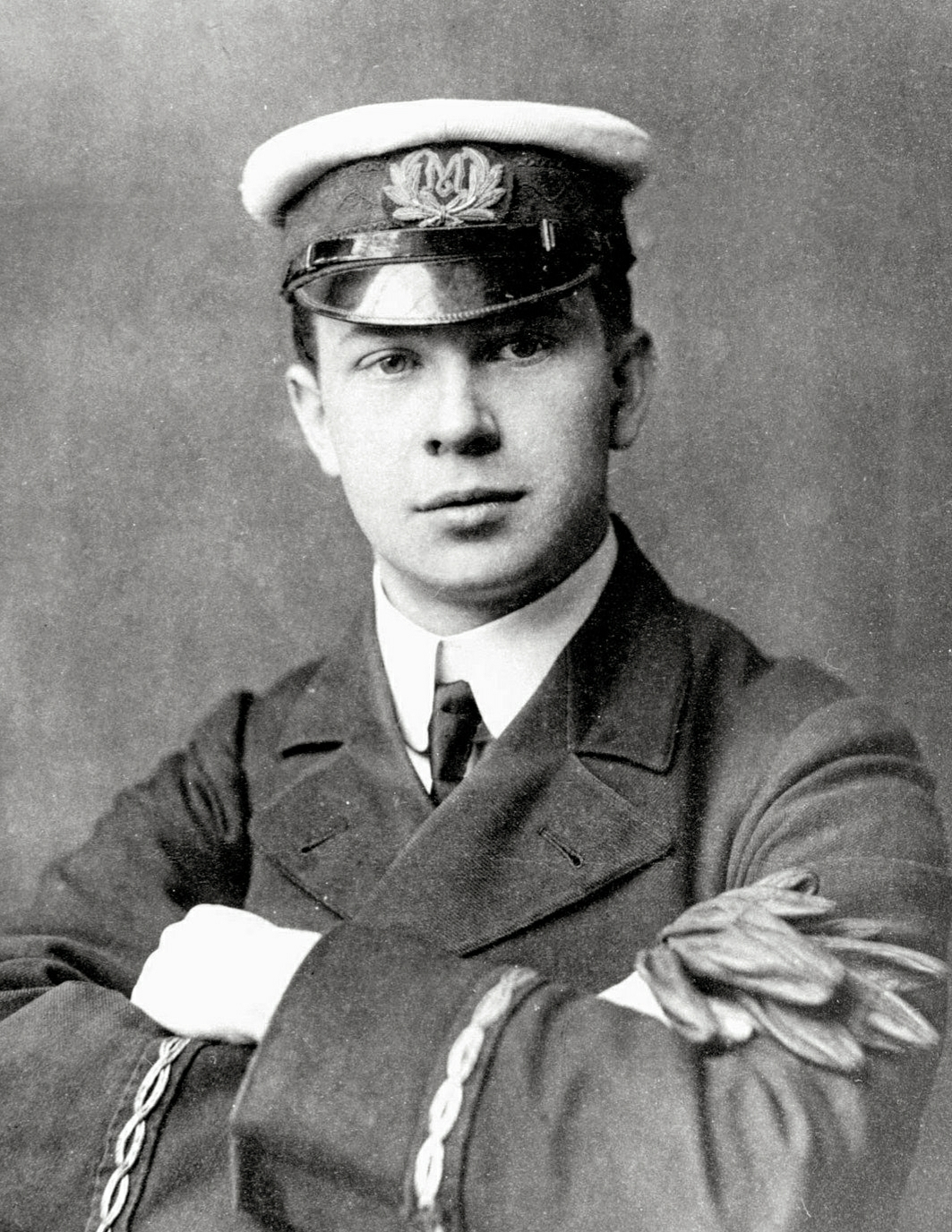
- Phillips, c. 1910, by Jennie Stedman
- Born: 11 April 1887; Farncombe, Surrey, England
- Died: 15 April 1912 (aged 25); North Atlantic Ocean
- Occupation: Wireless telegraphist
- Employer: Marconi International Marine Communication Company
- Known for: Chief wireless operator aboard RMS Titanic

John George "Jack" Phillips (11 April 1887 – 15 April 1912) was a British wireless telegraphist, who served as the chief wireless operator aboard RMS Titanic during her ill-fated maiden voyage in April 1912. He did not survive the sinking and his body, if recovered, was not identified.

== Early life ==
Phillips was born on 11 April 1887 in Farncombe, Surrey, the son of George Alfred Phillips, a draper and Ann Phillips (née Sanders). His family originally came from Trowbridge, Wiltshire, from a lineage of weavers, but moved to Farncombe around 1883. Phillips was one of five siblings, of whom he and his two twin sisters, Elsie and Ethel, survived to adulthood. He grew up above a draper's shop – Gammons – which his father managed in Farncombe Street. Educated at a private school on Hare Lane, then St John Street School, Phillips sang as a choirboy at St. John the Evangelist Church.

He finished school in 1902 and began working at the Godalming post office, where he learned telegraphy. He started training to work in Wireless for the Marconi Company in March 1906, in Seaforth, and graduated five months later in August. Phillips went on to serve aboard ships such as the RMS Teutonic, SS Pretorian, RMS Lusitania, and RMS Mauretania. In May 1908, he was assigned to the Marconi station outside Clifden, Ireland, where he worked until 1911. He returned to sea aboard the RMS Adriatic and was then assigned the RMS Oceanic.

== RMS Titanic ==
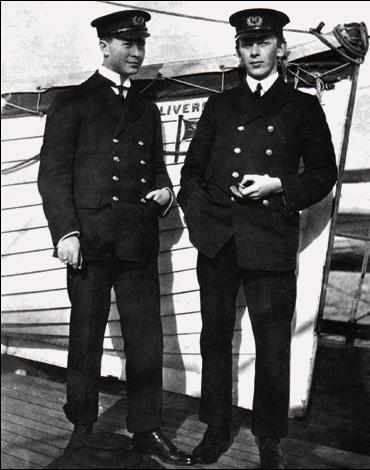
Phillips (left) with a fellow wireless operator on board the RMS Adriatic, c. 1911

In March 1912, Phillips was sent to Belfast, Ireland, to be the chief wireless operator on board Titanic for her maiden voyage. He was joined by junior wireless operator Harold Bride. Stories have appeared that Phillips knew Bride before Titanic, but Bride later stated the pair had never met before he joined the ship in Belfast. Titanic sailed for New York City, United States, from Southampton, England, on 10 April 1912. Phillips celebrated his 25th birthday the day after the voyage began.

On 13 April, Phillips and Bride, spent most of the night before repairing the wireless machine, which had broken down the day before. Bride explained the issue later on, in a letter to the Marconi Company:

The night before the disaster Mr. Phillips and myself had had a deal of trouble, owing to the leads from the secondary of the transformer having burnt through inside the casing and make contact with certain iron bolts holding the woodwork and frame together, thereby earthing the power to a great extent. After binding these leads with rubber tape, we once more had the apparatus in perfect working order, but not before we had put in nearly six hours' work, Mr. Phillips being of the opinion that, in the first place, it was the condensers which had broken, and these we had had out and examined before locating the damage in the transformer.

=== Ice reports ===
During the voyage Phillips and Bride received ice warnings and other navigational information from other ships. Amongst the ice reports they received leading up to the night of 14 April were from the SS La Touraine, RMS Caronia, SS Noordam, SS Amerika, RMS Baltic, and SS Californian, all of which were sent to the bridge and acknowledged by the captain or the ship's operator. Of these, only the Californian was received by Bride while the rest were likely received by Phillips.

In the evening, Phillips was sending messages to Cape Race wireless station in Newfoundland, working to clear a backlog of passengers' personal messages that had accumulated when the wireless had broken down the day before. Shortly after 21:30, Phillips received an ice warning from the steamship Mesaba reporting drifting ice, a large number of icebergs, and an ice field. Phillips acknowledged Mesaba's warning and continued to transmit messages to Cape Race. The wireless operator on Mesaba, Stanley Adams, later said he waited for Phillips to send a message back from to the Captain, but none came, likely because the message sent was not marked with the prefix "MSG" (Master Service Gram) which would have required a response from the Captain. It is unclear whether or not Phillips delivered it to the bridge as he, the Captain, and three officers (including two who were on watch soon after the message was sent) perished in the sinking. Second Officer Charles Lightoller pointed out this notification appears have been delayed, and he himself was not informed in time.

At 22:55, Phillips was interrupted by Californian's Cyril Evans, the only wireless operator aboard Californian, who said, "Say old man, we are stopped surrounded by ice." Due to Californian's relative proximity, and the fact that both Evans and Phillips were using spark-gap wireless sets whose signals bled across the spectrum and were impossible to tune out, meant that Evans's signal was strong and loud in Phillips's ears, while the signals from Cape Race were faint to Phillips and inaudible to Evans.

Likely due to Evans' informal sounding message, which had no position nor "MSG" prefix to mark it out as official, Phillips sent back "DDD", telling him to stop transmitting. In the straight forward jargon of wireless operators, Evans interpreted Phillips' reply as "Keep out! I am working Cape Race!" Phillips continued communicating with Cape Race, while Evans listened a while longer before going to bed for the night. Contrary to belief, Evans was not offended. At the British Wreck Commissioner's inquiry, he told Lord Mersey that the comment was not meant as and nor perceived as an insult:

Lord Mersey: "In ordinary Marconi practice is that a common thing to be asked?"
Evans: "Yes. And you do not take it as an insult or anything like that."

Though it is unclear whether or not all the messages reached the captain, in particular the Mesaba and Amerika messages which were not recalled by either Bride or any surviving officers, it is known that majority of the ice warnings received had been communicated to Captain Edward Smith, as he acknowledged them in return. He was aware that there was ice in the area and, according to Second Officer Lightoller, discussed this with him. Additionally, both lookouts were told to keep an eye out for "small ice and growlers" by Lightoller on the night of disaster and the Second Officer passed this information onto First Officer William Murdoch who took over the watch at 10:00 PM.

=== Collision ===
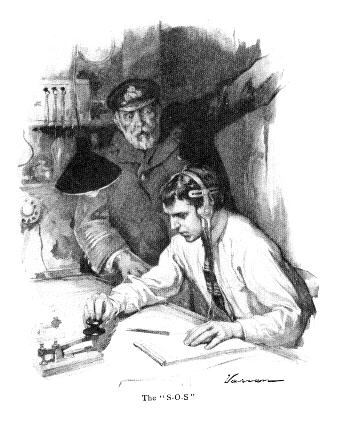
Captain Smith sends distress messages to Jack Phillips depicted in a 1912 illustration by Francis Arnold Collins.

Titanic struck an iceberg at 23:40 that night and began sinking. Bride had woken up and begun getting ready to relieve Phillips when Captain Edward Smith entered the wireless room and told Phillips to prepare to send out a distress signal. Shortly after midnight, Captain Smith came in again and told them to send out the call for assistance and gave them Titanic's estimated position. Phillips began sending out the distress signal, code CQD, while Bride took messages to Captain Smith about which ships were coming to Titanic's assistance. At one point, Bride half-jokingly told Phillips that the new call was SOS and said, "Send S.O.S., it's the new call, and it may be your last chance to send it." Phillips was able to contact RMS Carpathia which headed for the scene.

After taking a quick break, Phillips returned to the wireless room and reported to Bride that the forward part of the ship was flooded, and they should put on more clothes and lifebelts. Bride began to get ready, while Phillips went back to work on the wireless machine.

The wireless power was almost completely out shortly after 02:00, when Captain Smith arrived and told the men they had done their duty and were relieved. Bride later remembered being moved by the way Phillips continued working. While their backs were turned, a crew member (either a stoker or trimmer) sneaked in and attempted to steal Phillips's lifebelt. Bride, outraged at the man's behaviour, attacked the man and might have hit him with an object. Shortly afterwards, they abandoned the wireless room, leaving the motionless crewman where he fell. The men then split up, Bride heading forward and Phillips heading aft. This was the last time Bride saw Phillips.

=== Death ===
Conflicting and contradictory information led to popular belief that Phillips possibly managed to make it to the overturned Collapsible Boat B, which was in the charge of Second Officer Charles Lightoller, along with Harold Bride but did not last the night. In his The New York Times interview, Bride said that a man from boat B was dead, and that as he boarded Carpathia, he saw that the dead man was Phillips. However, when testifying in the Senate Inquiry, Bride said that he had only been told that Phillips died on Collapsible B, and was later buried at sea from Carpathia and had not witnessed this for himself. (Note: It is likely that the story was dramatised by the journalist who had initially reported on Bride's story.)

In his book, Colonel Archibald Gracie said a body was transferred from the collapsible onto boat #12 but said that the body was definitely not that of Phillips. He reported that when speaking with Lightoller that agreed with him that the body was not Phillips. In Lightoller's testimony at the United States Senate inquiry into the sinking of the Titanic, he says that Bride told him that Phillips had been aboard and died on the boat, but it is clear that Lightoller never saw this for himself. In Lightoller's 1935 autobiography, Titanic and Other Ships, he writes that Phillips was aboard Collapsible B and told everyone the position of the various ships they had contacted by wireless, and when they could expect a rescue, before succumbing to the cold and dying. He also claims that Phillips' body was taken aboard Boat No. 12 at his insistence.

It is clear from Gracie and other 1912 evidence that the man on the upturned collapsible who called out the names of approaching ships was Harold Bride, not Jack Phillips, as Lightoller thought in 1935. Lightoller's 1912 testimony contradicts his 1935 statements that he saw Phillips aboard B and that the body taken off the boat was Phillips. Salon Steward Thomas Whiteley may have been Bride's source for the story; in a press interview, Whiteley claimed that Phillips had been aboard the collapsible, died and was taken aboard Carpathia. As no other witness in 1912 claimed Phillips' body was recovered, and his name was never mentioned by any source aboard Carpathia as being one of the four bodies buried at sea, it is possible that Whiteley was simply mistaken in his identification, or that Phillips was aboard Collapsible B but his body was not recovered.

== Legacy ==
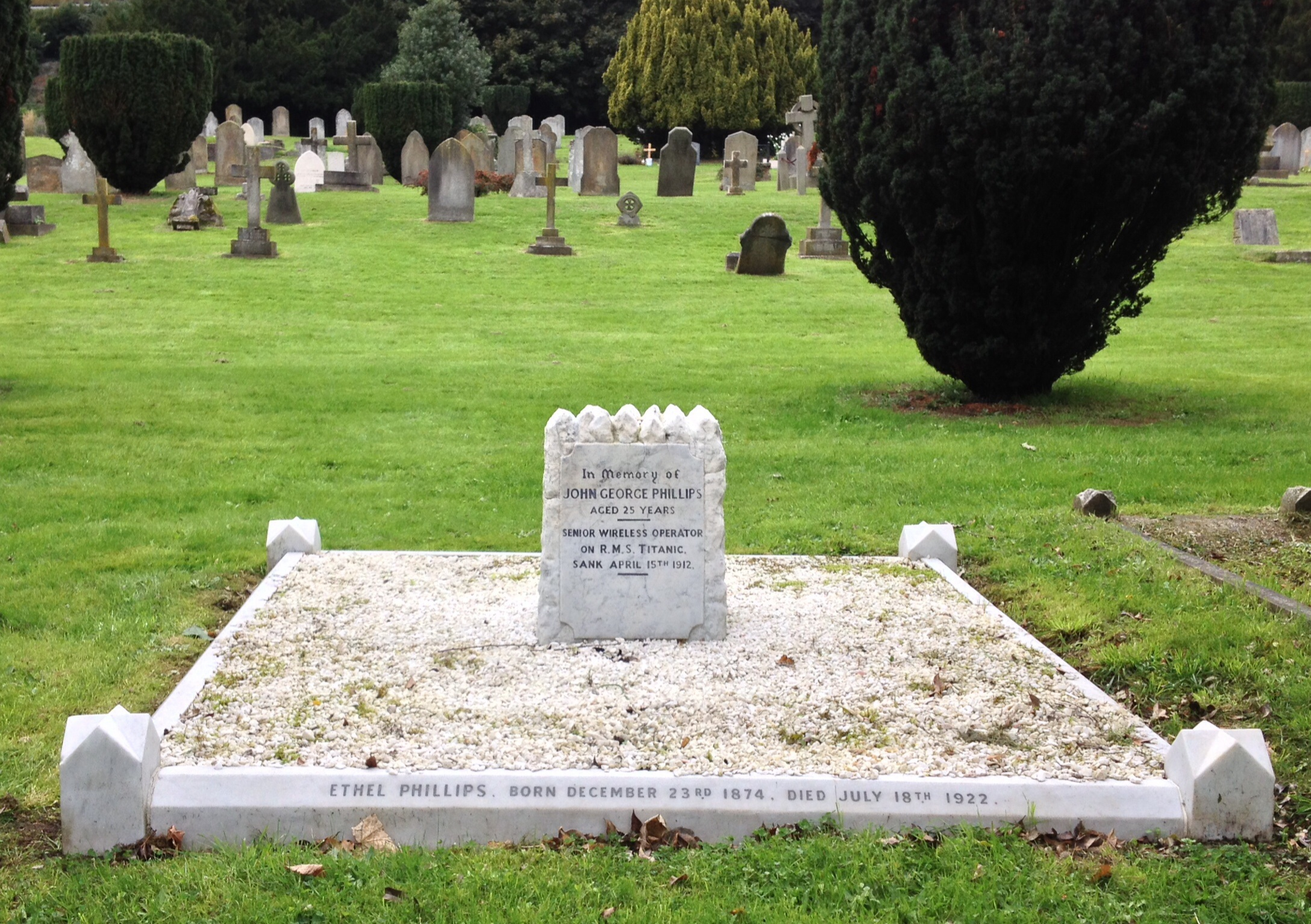
Jack Phillips memorial, Nightingale Cemetery, Farncombe

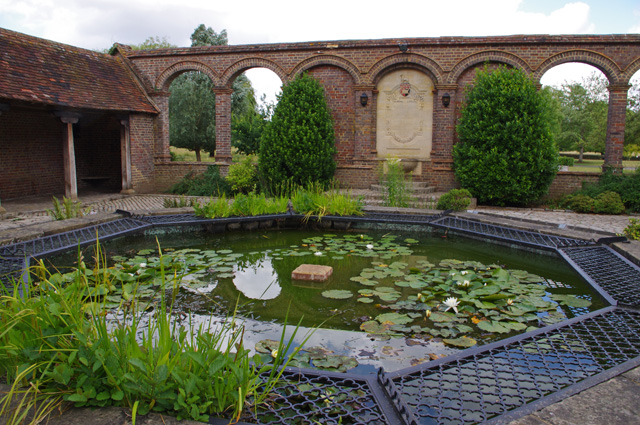
Phillips Memorial Cloister, Church of St Peter & St Paul, Godalming

There are memorials to Phillips in Nightingale Cemetery, Farncombe and in the Phillips Memorial Cloister, part of the Phillips Memorial Ground, which lies to the north of the Church of St Peter & St Paul, Godalming. The cloister was designed by architect Hugh Thackeray Turner while the gardens inside and around it was designed by horticulturist Gertrude Jekyll. In 2012, marking the 100th anniversary of the sinking, the Cloister and grounds were renovated. A Wetherspoons pub on Godalming high street is named "The Jack Phillips" in his honour.

In 1915, in Battery Park in New York City, a granite cenotaph was erected decorated with a carved swag of seashells and foliage and inscribed with the names of wireless operators who "lost their lives at sea while performing their duties." Phillips' name was the first carved, with others added soon after. Willa Cather wrote about the commemoration: "This monument is one of the most attractive and most friendly commemorative works in New York... these men died in storm and terror, but their names are brought together here and abide in a pleasant place with cheerful companionship."

On 11 April 2017, on what would have been his 130th birthday, the Godalming Town Council unveiled a blue plaque at Phillips' birthplace.

== Portrayals ==
- Karl Dannemann (1943) - Titanic (Film)
- Ashley Cowan (1953) - Titanic (Film)
- Guy Sorel (1955) - You Are There: The Sinking of the Titanic (TV episode, 22 May 1955)
- Kenneth Griffith (1958) – A Night to Remember (Film)
- Alec Sabin (1979) S.O.S. Titanic (TV film)
- Matt Hill (1996) – Titanic (TV miniseries)
- Gregory Cooke (1997) – Titanic (Film)
- Justin Shaw (2003) – Ghosts of the Abyss (Documentary)
- Mark James Fernandes (2006) – Seconds from Disaster (TV series; Season 3, Episode 1: Titanic)
- Karl Davies (2008) — The Unsinkable Titanic (Documentary)
- Ermanis Grinvalds (2011) - Curiosity: What Sank Titanic? (TV episode)
- Thomas Lynskey (2012) - The Last Signals (Short Film)
- Jon Huybrecht (2017) - Titanic: Sinking the Myths (Documentary)
- Parnell Scott (2025) – Titanic Sinks Tonight (TV series by the BBC)
