= Allan Line =

British transport company

- French advertisment of the Allan Line
- Type: Private
- Industry: Shipping and transportation
- Founded: 1819; 207 years ago
- Founder: Alexander Allan
- Defunct: 1918
- Fate: Purchased by Canadian Pacific Steamship Company
- Headquarters: Glasgow, Scotland
- Area served: Transatlantic; Canadian Service
- Footnotes House flag

The Allan Line Steamship Company Ltd., of Glasgow was a British shipping line which ran ships between the United Kingdom and Canada. Founded in 1819, it provided cargo and passenger transport services between Glasgow and Liverpool to Canada. Under the Allan family, the line became was the world's largest privately owned shipping concern by the 1890s. Financial difficulties in the early 20th-century forced the family to sell their assets to the Canadian Pacific Steamship Company in 1917, with the line's name disappearing by the following year.

== History ==
House flag in use around 1905

The line was founded in 1819, by Captain Alexander Allan of Saltcoats, Ayrshire, trading and transporting between Scotland and Montreal, a route which quickly became synonymous with the Allan Line. By the 1830s the company had offices in Glasgow, Liverpool and Montreal. All five of Captain Allan's sons were actively involved with the business, but it was his second son, Sir Hugh Allan, who spearheaded the second generation. In 1854, Hugh launched the Montreal Ocean Steamship Company as part of the Allan Line, and two years later ousted Samuel Cunard to take control of the Royal Mail contract between Britain and North America.

In 1891, the company took over the State Line (founded 1872) and was often referred to as the Allan & State Line. In 1897, Andrew Allan amalgamated the various branches of the Allan shipping empire under one company. The company by then had added offices in Boston and London. In 1917, under Sir Montagu Allan, who represented the third generation of the Allan family, the company was purchased by Canadian Pacific Steamship Company, and by the following year the Allan name had disappeared from commercial shipping.

== Notable collisions ==
In 1891, the Allan Line steamship Carthaginian collided with the York River Line steamship Charlotte in the shipping channel at Baltimore, Maryland. Among those aboard Carthaginian was the Danish-American composer Asger Hamerik. Both ships were damaged, but neither sank.

In 1905, the Allan Line ship Parisian was involved in a collision with the Hamburg America Line ship Albano off of Halifax, Nova Scotia. The Exchequer Court of Canada found Albano to be fully at fault, according to Reports of Cases Relating to Maritime Law.

== List of steamships ==
List of Allan Line steamships
Name	Shipyard	GRT	Launch date	Notes	Image
Alsatian	William Beardmore and Company	18,481	1914	Transferred to Canadian Pacific in 1917; renamed Empress of France in 1919. Sister ship of the Calgarian.	
America	Robert Steele & Company	1,826	1847	Chartered from Cunard Line for four voyages between 1863 and 1864; only transatlantic paddle steamer employed by Allan.	
Anglo Saxon	William Denny and Brothers	1,715	1856	Wrecked off Cape Race in 1863 with the loss of 238 lives.	
Assyrian	Earle's Shipbuilding	3,970	1880	Purchased from the Monarch Line in 1887 and renamed from Assyrian Monarch. Scrapped in 1902.	
Australasian	William Denny and Brothers	7,801	1901	Chartered from the New Zealand Shipping Company for five voyages; renamed from Ruapehu, then reverted back upon return.	
Austrian	Barclay Curle	2,458	1867	Scrapped in 1905.	
Bavarian	William Denny and Brothers	10,576	1899	Served as troopship for the Second Boer War, 1899-1902. Wrecked in the St. Lawrence River near Montreal in 1905; no loss of life.	
Belgian	Caird & Company	2,259	1855	Purchased from the Hamburg America Line in 1864 and renamed from Hammonia. Sold to the Dominion Line in 1872; renamed to Missouri in 1873.	
Bohemian	William Denny and Brothers	2,200	1859	Wrecked off Cape Elizabeth on 22 February 1864 with loss of 20 lives.	
Brazilian	D. and W. Henderson and Company	2,200	1891	Sold to Brazil in 1910; renamed Corcovado.	
Buenos Ayrean	William Denny and Brothers	5,359	1880	Laid up in 1909; Scrapped in Falmouth in 1911.	
Calgarian	Fairfields	17,515	1913	Transferred to Canadian Pacific in 1917. Converted to armed merchant vessel in 1914 as HMS Calgarian. Torpedoed and sunk off Rathlin Island on 1 March 1918 with loss of 49 lives. Sister ship of the Alsatian.	
Californian	Alexander Stephen and Sons	4,244	1891	Purchased as State of California while being built for the State Line. Renamed Californian in 1898. Sold to New York & Porto Rico Line in 1901; renamed Coamo.	
Canadian	William Denny and Brothers	1,764	1854	Wrecked near Quebec in 1857; no loss of life.	
Canadian	Robert Steele & Company	1,926	1860	Sunk after collision with ice in the strait of Belle Isle on 4 June 1861 with loss of 34 lives.	
Canadian	Thomas Royden & Sons	2,911	1873	Scrapped in 1903.	
Carthaginian	Govan Shipbuilders	4,444	1884	Sunk by a mine off Inishtrahull in 1917; no loss of life.	
Caspian	London & Glasgow Shipbuilding Co.	2,728	1870	Scrapped in 1897.	
Castilian	Workman, Clark and Company	2,728	1899	Wrecked in Bay of Fundy while on her return maiden voyage; no loss of life.	
Circassian	Robert Steele & Company	3,724	1873	Original GRT was 3,211 before rebuild in 1875. Scrapped in 1896.	
City of Vienna	Workman, Clark and Company	4,683	1889	Chartered from Ellerman City Line for three voyages in 1906.	
City of Bombay	Workman, Clark and Company	4,548	1885	Chartered from Ellerman City Line for nine voyages between 1903 and 1907.	
Corean	William Doxford & Sons	3,488	1881	Scrapped in 1908.	
Corinthian	William Denny and Brothers	1,517	1856	Originally called Damascus. Chartered from the Cunard Line for two voyages in 1862 and purchased in 1865. Original GRT was 1,213 before rebuild in 1875 when renamed. Sold to Italy in 1881 and renamed Genova.	
Corinthian	Workman, Clark and Company	6,227	1900	Transferred to Canadian Pacific in 1917. Wrecked near Brier Island in the Bay of Fundy in 1918; no loss of life.	
Corsican	Barclay Curle	11,419	1907	Transferred to Canadian Pacific in 1917. Renamed to Marvale in 1922.	
European	Malcomson's Neptune Shipyard	2,629	1866	Purchased from London & New York SS Line in 1869 and renamed from William Penn. Sold to Hughes Line in 1872.	
Gallia	Thomson Shipyard	4,809	1879	Purchased from the Beaver Line in 1899. Became stranded at Sorel Point, Quebec. Salvaged and scrapped in 1900.	
Germany	Matthew Pearse and Company	3,244	1868	Wrecked near Bordeaux, South Carolina, in 1872 with loss of 30 lives.	
Grampian	Alexander Stephen and Sons	9,603	1907	Royal Mail Ship (RMS). Transferred to Canadian Pacific in 1917. Caught fire during refit in 1921 and abandoned. Scrapped in the Netherlands in 1926. Sister ship of the Hesperian.	
Grecian	William Doxford & Sons	3,481	1879	Notable for helping rescue survivors of the La Bourgogne disaster in July 1898. Ran aground at Sandwich Point, Halifax, on 9 February 1902; no loss of life. Scrapped in situ.	
Hanoverian	William Doxford & Sons	3,503	1882	Wrecked near Newfoundland in 1885; no loss of life.	
Hesperian	Alexander Stephen and Sons	10,920	1908	Royal Mail Ship (RMS). Torpedoed and sunk off Fastnet on 6 September 1915 with loss of 32 lives. Sister ship of the Grampian.	
Hibernian	William Denny and Brothers	3,440	1861	Original GRT was 1,888 before rebuild to 2,752 tons in 1871 and to 3,440 tons in 1884. Scrapped in Germany in 1901.	
Hibernian	—	4,505	1902	Purchased from Norfolk & North American SS Company in 1904 and renamed from Orient Point. Sold to Chargeurs Réunis in 1913 and renamed to Amiral Ganteaume	
Hungarian	William Denny and Brothers	2,190	1859	Wrecked at Cape Sable, Nova Scotia, on February 19, 1860 with loss of all lives aboard.	
Hungarian	—	4,508	1902	Purchased from Norfolk & North American SS Company in 1903 and renamed from South Point. Sold to Chargeurs Réunis in 1913 and renamed to Amiral Charner	
Huronian	Palmers Shipbuilding Company	6,550	1901	Disappeared without trace in the Atlantic Ocean.	
Indian	William Denny and Brothers	1,764	1856	Served as troopship during the Crimean War. Wreck near Cape Race on 21 November 1859 with loss of 27 lives.	
Ionian	Workman, Clark and Company	8,268	1901	Transferred to Canadian Pacific in 1917. Torpedoed and sunk off Milford Haven with loss of 7 lives.	
Jura	Thomson Shipyard	2,241	1854	Chartered from the Cunard Line for two voyages in 1860 and purchased from them in 1861. Wrecked in River Mersey in 1864; no loss of life.	
Lake Erie	Barclay Curle	7,550	1899	Chartered from Canadian Pacific for 23 voyages between 1910 and 1913.	
Livonian	Dobie & Company	4,162	1882	Purchased from Twin Screw Line in 1897 and renamed from Ludgate Hill. Sold to British Admiralty in 1914. Scuttled as blockship.	
Lucerne	Laird Company	1,925	1879	Sold to U.S. government in 1898.	
Manitoban	Laird Company	2,395	1865	Purchased from the British Colonial SS Company in 1869. Original GRT was 1,810. Rebuilt in 1872 and renamed from Ottawa. Scrapped in 1899.	
Mongolian	D. and W. Henderson and Company	4,838	1891	Sold to British Admiralty in 1915	
Monte Videan	D. and W. Henderson and Company	4,838	1888	Scrapped in 1910.	
Moravian	Robert Steele & Co.	3,323	1864	Original GRT was 2,481 before rebuild in 1874. Wrecked near Nova Scotia; no loss of life.	
Nestorian	Barclay Curle	2,689	1867	Original GRT was 2,466 before rebuild in 1878. Scrapped in 1897.	
North American	William Denny and Brothers	1,715	1856	Sold in 1874 and converted to barque.	
North Briton	William Denny and Brothers	2,187	1858	Wrecked on Mingan Islands on 5 November 1861; no loss of life.	
Norwegian	William Denny and Brothers	1,888	1861	Wrecked on St. Paul Island, Nova Scotia, on 14 June 1863; no loss of life.	
Norwegian	Tod & MacGregor Shipyard	3,523	1865	Built as City of New York for Inman Line. Purchased and renamed in 1884. Scrapped in the Netherlands in 1903.	
Nova Scotian	William Denny and Brothers	3,305	1858	Original GRT was 2,108 before rebuild in 1873. Scrapped in 1893.	
Numidian	D. and W. Henderson and Company	4,836	1891	Sold to British Admiralty in 1914. Scuttled as blockship.	
Ontarian	Robert Duncan and Company	4,078	1900	Cargo-only liner. Sold to Donaldson Line in 1913.	
Orcardian	Workman, Clark and Company	3,546	1893	Cargo-only liner. Purchased from R & C Line in 1894 and renamed from Ormiston. Sold to Donaldson Line in 1914 and renamed Polaria.	
Palestine	Robert Steele & Company	1,800	1858	Chartered from the Cunard Line for four voyages in 1860.	
Parisian	Robert Napier and Sons	5,395	1881	Original GRT was 5,154 and was initially fitted with sails. Modernised and refitted in 1899. First Allan liner to have a wireless set, installed in 1902. Scrapped in Italy in 1914.	
Peruvian	Robert Steele & Company	3,038	1864	Original GRT was 2,549 before rebuild in 1874. Scrapped in Italy in 1905.	
Phoenician	Barclay Curle	2,356	1864	Originally called Saint David and original GRT was 1,516. Rebuilt and renamed in 1873. Scrapped in Genoa in 1905.	
Polynesian	Robert Steele & Company	3,983	1872	Nicknamed "Rolling Poly" because of her tendency to roll. Originally fitted with sails, rebuilt and modernised in 1893 and renamed to Laurentian. Wrecked near Cape Race in 1909; no loss of life.	
Pomeranian	Robert Steele & Company	4,364	1882	Purchased from the Monarch Line in 1887 and renamed from Grecian Monarch. Transferred to Canadian Pacific in 1917. Torpedoed and sunk near Portland Bill with loss of 45 lives.	
Pretorian	Furness, Withy & Company	7,654	1901	Transferred to Canadian Pacific in 1917. Laid up in 1922 and scrapped in 1926.	framless
Prussian	A. & J. Inglis	2,794	1869	Scrapped in Genoa in 1898.	
Rosarian	D. and W. Henderson and Company	3,077	1887	Scrapped in 1910.	
Roumanian	Murray Brothers Shipyard	4,225	1883	Purchased from Twin Screw Line in 1897 and renamed from Richmond Hill. Sold to U. S. Army in 1898 and renamed to Crook.	
Saint George	Robert Steele & Company	1,468	1861	Wrecked near Seal Island, Nova Scotia in 1869; no loss of life.	
Saint Patrick	Alexander Stephen and Sons	1,101	1854	Originally a full-rigged sail ship called John Bell before being converted to a steam ship. Chartered from Anchor Line in 1862. Purchased by Allan Line in 1863. Converted back to sailing ship in 1875. Sold to Germany in 1879 and renamed Diamant.	
Samaritan	Robert Steele & Company	3,647	1871	Served as troopship in the Ashanti War. Scrapped in Rotterdam in 1908.	
Sardinian	Robert Steele & Company	4,376	1875	Transferred to Canadian Pacific in 1917. Sold to Spain in 1920. Scrapped in 1938.	
Scandinavian	Robert Steele & Company	2,840	1870	Scrapped in Italy in 1899.	
Scandinavian	Harland and Wolff	11,394	1898	Purchased from the White Star Line in 1912 and renamed from Romanic. Transferred to Canadian Pacific in 1917. Scrapped in 1923.	
Scotian	Harland and Wolff	10,322	1898	Purchased from the Holland America Line in 1911 and renamed from Statendam. Transferred to Canadian Pacific in 1917. Renamed Marglen in 1922. Scrapped in 1927	
Siberian	Govan Shipbuilders	3,904	1884	Scrapped in Falmouth in 1912.	
Sicilian	Workman, Clark and Company	6,224	1899	Served as troopship for the Second Boer War, 1899-1902. Transferred to Canadian Pacific in 1917. Converted to cargo ship in 1922 and renamed Bruton.	
State of Georgia	London & Glasgow Shipbuilding Co.	2,490	1873	Purchased with State Line fleet in 1891. Made two voyages for Allan Line. Sold to the Aberdeen Line in 1893. Disappeared at sea in 1896.	
State of Indiana	Thomas Wingate & Company	2,528	1874	Purchased with State Line fleet in 1891. Made one voyage for Allan Line. Sold to Turkey in 1893 and renamed Ismir.	
State of Nebraska	London & Glasgow Shipbuilding Co.	3,986	1880	Purchased with State Line fleet in 1891. Scrapped in 1902.	
State of Nevada	London & Glasgow Shipbuilding Co.	2,488	1874	Purchased with State Line fleet in 1891. Made nine voyages for Allan Line. Sold to Turkey in 1893 and renamed Mekke.	
Tainui	William Denny and Company	5,086	1884	Chartered from the Shaw, Savill & Albion Line for six voyages.	
Tunisian	Alexander Stephen and Sons	10,576	1900	Served as troopship during World War I, 1914-1918. Transferred to Canadian Pacific in 1917. Renamed Marburn in 1922. Scrapped in 1928.	
Turanian	Dobie & Company	4,021	1881	Purchased from Twin Screw Line in 1897 and renamed from Tower Hill. Wrecked on Cape Verde Islands in 1899 and subsequently scrapped.	
Victorian	Workman, Clark and Company	10,629	1905	Royal Mail Ship (RMS). Transferred to Canadian Pacific in 1917. Renamed Marloch in 1922. Scrapped in 1929. Sister ship of the Virginian.	
Virginian	Alexander Stephen and Sons	10,754	1905	Royal Mail Ship (RMS). One of the ships which responded to the distress calls of RMS Titanic in April 1912. Transferred to Canadian Pacific in 1917. Sold to Swedish American Line in 1920 and renamed Drottningholm. Scrapped in 1955. Sister ship of the Victorian.	
Waldensian	Barclay Curle	2,256	1861	Originally called Saint Andrew with GRT of 1,432. Rebuilt and renamed in 1873. Scrapped in Genoa in 1903.	
