= SS Sardinian =

British ship

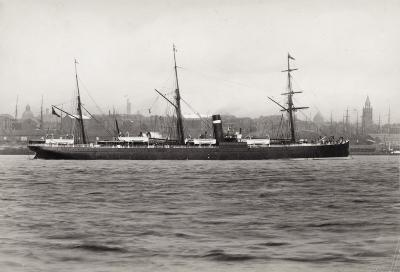
- SS Sardinian around 1890

History
- Name: (United Kingdom) SS Sardinian
- Namesake: Sardinia
- Owner: Allan Line Royal Mail Steamers (1874-1917); Canadian Pacific Line (1917-1920); Astoreca Azqueta (1920-1934); Compania Carbonera (1934-1938)
- Port of registry: Liverpool/Glasgow, United Kingdom
- Route: Liverpool - Quebec - Montreal
- Builder: Robert Steele & Co.
- Yard number: 81
- Laid down: 1874
- Launched: 3 June 1874
- Completed: 25 January 1875
- Acquired: 25 January 1875
- Maiden voyage: 29 July 1875
- In service: 29 July 1875
- Out of service: 1938
- Identification: 71695
- Fate: Scrapped 1938

General characteristics
- Type: Passenger/Cargo ship
- Tonnage: 4,376 GRT
- Length: 121.92 metres (400 ft 0 in)
- Beam: 12.87 metres (42 ft 3 in)
- Depth: 6.01 metres (19 ft 9 in)
- Installed power: 1 x 2 cyl. Compound engine and 3 Masts
- Propulsion: Screw propeller
- Speed: 13 knots
- Capacity: 120 First Class Passengers; 850 Third Class Passengers
- Notes: 1 Funnel

SS Sardinian was a British Passenger- and Cargo ship that was scrapped at Bilbao, Spain after 63 years of service (1875–1938).

== Construction ==
Sardinian was constructed in 1874 at the Robert Steele & Co. shipyard at the Cartsburn yard in Greenock, United Kingdom for Allen Line. She was launched on 3 June 1874 and completed the following year. She made her first voyage on 29 July 1875 from Liverpool to Quebec to Montreal. The ship was 121.92 metres (400 ft 0 in) long, with a beam of 12.87 metres (42 ft 3 in) and a depth of 6.01 metres (19 ft 9 in). The ship was assessed at 4,376 GRT. She had 1 x 2 cyl. Compound engine driving a single screw propeller and 3 Masts. The engine was rated at 600 nhp.

== Career ==
Sardinian sailed mostly from Liverpool or Glasgow to different destinations in Canada like Montreal, Quebec and Halifax with some stopovers in the American cities of New York, Baltimore and Portland. Most of her voyages occurred without incident, but on 10 May 1878, after she had left Liverpool, her coal bunker exploded when she was near Moville, Ireland. The explosion killed and injured several Scandinavian passengers and the ship caught fire and was scuttled to extinguish it so that only her upper decks stuck out of the water. The survivors were brought to Derry, Ireland. She was ultimately salvaged and repaired and returned to service on 26 June 1878. In 1897 the ship was re-engined with triple-expansion engines which created 316 nhp and her masts were reduced to two.

The first deployment of Canadian Troops to a foreign war was aboard Sardinian sailing from Quebec City to the Boer war in South Africa in 1899 and the ship transported Guglielmo Marconi and his equipment on 26 November 1901 so he could set up a wireless station at St Johns, Newfoundland.

The Sardinian continued to sail under Allan Line until she was bought by the Canadian Pacific Line in 1917. On 8 December 1920 she was sold again to Astoreca Azqueta and was reduced to a coal hulk at Vigo, Spain therefore ending her days at sea. She switched owners one last time in 1934 when she was bought by Compania Carbonera.

== Final days ==
SS Sardinian was sold for scrap on 22 June 1938 and was scrapped at Bilbao that same year ending her 63 year long career.

The ship was important in Canada's history for transporting Home Children where it was featured on a 2010 Canadian postage stamp.
