= RMS Virginian =

1904 steam turbine powered ocean liner

- Post card featuring the RMS Virginian

History
- Name: 1904: Virginian; 1920: Drottningholm; 1948: Brasil; 1951: Homeland
- Namesake: 1920: Drottningholm; 1948: Brazil
- Owner: 1905: Allan Line; 1917: Canadian Pacific; 1920: Swedish American Line; 1948: South Atlantic Lines or; Panamanian Navigation Co; 1951: Mediterranean Lines; 1953: Home Lines
- Operator: 1905: Allan Line; 1909: Allan Bros & Co (UK) Ltd; 1914: (United Kingdom) Royal Navy; 1920: A Jonsson Jr & VR Olburs; 1931: A Jonsson; 1948: Home Lines; 1951: Hamburg America Line
- Port of registry: 1905: (United Kingdom) Glasgow; 1919: (Canada) Montreal; 1920: (Sweden) Gothenburg; 1948: Panama City
- Route: Liverpool – Montreal (1905–14); Gothenburg – New York; (1920–34, 1945–48); Genoa – Rio de Janeiro (1948–50); Genoa – New York (1950–51)
- Ordered: October 1903
- Builder: Alexander Stephen and Sons
- Yard number: 405
- Launched: 22 December 1904
- Completed: April 1905
- Commissioned: 10 December 1914
- Decommissioned: December 1918
- Maiden voyage: 6 April 1905
- Refit: 1920, 1951, re-engined 1922
- Identification: Code letters HCJG (1905–19); Wireless call sign: MGN (1905–19); Pennant number (as AMC): M 72 (August 1914 – January 1918); MI 95 (January – April 1918); MI 52 (April – November 1918); Code letters KCMH (1920–33); Call sign SJMA (1934–48)
- Nickname(s): 1920: "Rollingholm", "Rollinghome"; 1940s: "Trotting Home"
- Fate: Scrapped in 1955

General characteristics
- Type: Ocean liner
- Tonnage: as built: 10,754 GRT, 6,844 NRT; 1922 onward: 11,055 GRT, 6,485 NRT
- Length: 517.0 ft (157.6 m) p/p; 538.0 ft (164.0 m) o/a
- Beam: 60.0 ft (18.3 m)
- Depth: 38.0 ft (11.6 m)
- Decks: 3
- Installed power: 12,000 IHP
- Propulsion: steam turbines, three screws
- Speed: 18 knots (33 km/h) (1904–22); 17 knots (31 km/h) (1922–55)
- Capacity: as built: 1,912 passengers; 426 1st class; 286 2nd class; 1,000 3rd class; 12,440 cu ft (352 m^{3}) refrigerated cargo; 1920–51: 1,280 passengers; 280 cabin class; 300 2nd class; 700 3rd class
- Armament: as armed merchant cruiser: primary armament: December 1914 – July 1916: 8 × QF 4.7-inch guns; July 1916 – November 1918: 6 × BL 6-inch & QF 6-inch guns; secondary armament: by October 1915: 2 × 6-pdr guns; by October 1916: depth charges
- Notes: sister ship: RMS Victorian

RMS Virginian was a steam turbine ocean liner. One of the earliest of her type, she was designed as a transatlantic liner and mail ship for Allan Line, built in Scotland, and launched in 1904.

In the First World War, the Virginian spent a few months as a troopship, then was converted into an armed merchant cruiser (AMC). In August 1917 a U-boat damaged her with a torpedo.

In 1920 she was sold to the Swedish American Line and renamed SS Drottningholm. As a neutral passenger ship during the Second World War she performed notable service repatriating thousands of civilians of various countries on both sides of the war.

In 1948 Drottningholm was sold to a company in the Italian Home Lines group, which renamed her Brasil.

In 1951 Home Lines chartered her to Hamburg America Line, which renamed her Homeland. She was scrapped in Italy in 1955.

== Background ==
The world's first steam turbine merchant ship, TS King Edward, was launched in 1901. She was a technological and commercial success, but was only a 502 GRT excursion steamship making short-sea trips in and around the Firth of Clyde, and her running costs – and hence passenger fares – were higher than those of her competitors with conventional reciprocating engines.

However, in October 1903 Allan Line announced that it had ordered a pair of new 10,000 GRT liners, that they would be turbine-powered, and that they would have the same three-screw arrangement as King Edward. And on 28 January 1904, seven months before Victorian was launched, the Government of Canada announced it had awarded Allan Line a transatlantic mail contract.

The Canadian contract required a regular scheduled service with four ships. Allan Line allocated the new Victorian and Virginian, which were still being built, and its existing 10576 GRT liners Bavarian and Tunisian. The subsidy would be $5,000 per trip for Bavarian and Tunisian, and $10,000 per trip for each of the new turbine ships.

== Design and construction ==
Allan Line ordered both Victorian and Virginian from Workman, Clark and Company in Belfast. But Workman, Clark did not find enough labour to build both ships in time, so the order for Virginian was transferred to Alexander Stephen and Sons at Linthouse on the River Clyde.

Virginian was launched on 25 August 1904, four months after Victorian. But Victorian's completion was then delayed by performance problems with her turbines. Both sisters were completed in March 1905.

As built, Virginian had three Parsons turbines. A high-pressure turbine drove her middle screw. Its exhaust steam was fed to a pair of low-pressure turbines that drove her port and starboard screws. The three turbines combined gave her a total power output of 12,000 IHP.

Virginian was 517.0 ft (157.6 m) long, her beam was 60.0 ft (18.3 m) and her depth was 38.0 ft (11.6 m). She had berths for 1,912 passengers: 426 in first class, 286 in second class and 1,000 in third class. Her holds had 12,440 cu ft (352 m^{3}) of refrigerated space for perishable cargo. As built, her tonnages were 10,754 GRT and 6,844 NRT.

== RMS Virginian ==
Virginian began her maiden voyage from Liverpool on 6 April 1905, a fortnight after Victorian. She called at Moville in Ireland the next day and reached Halifax, Nova Scotia on the morning of 14 April. Two months later Virginian set a westbound record, leaving Moville at 1400 hrs on 9 June and reaching Cape Race at 2100 hrs on 13 June. This was despite having to slow down for a bank of fog.

The speed at which steam turbines run efficiently is several times faster than the speed at which marine propellers work efficiently. But the turbines in Victorian and Virginian, like those in King Edward, drove the propellers directly, without reduction gearing. As a result, Virginian suffered cavitation, which not only impedes propulsion but also damages propellers.

Virginian and her sister ship gained a reputation of having the tendency to roll violently in heavy seas.

=== Titanic sinking ===
By 1912 Virginian was equipped for wireless telegraphy, operating on the 300 and 600 metre wavelengths. Her call sign was MGN.

When RMS Titanic sank on 15 April 1912, Virginian was about 178 nautical miles (330 km) north of her, steaming in the opposite direction. At 2310 hrs (0040 hrs ship's time) the Marconi Company radio station at Cape Race relayed Titanic's distress messages to Virginian, whose Master, Captain Gambell changed course to try to reach Titanic. Virginian also received Titanic's distress signals. The last signal Virginian received from Titanic was at 0027 hrs (0157 hrs by ship's time) at 2:17 AM. these signals were blurred and ended abruptly.

RMS Carpathia reached the position of the sinking and rescued 712 survivors. There was a false report that Virginian rescued some passengers and transferred them to Carpathia. In fact Virginian did not arrive in time to assist.

There was also a false report that Virginian had taken Titanic in tow, that all of Titanic's passengers were safe, and that Herbert Haddock, Master of RMS Olympic, was the source of the report. Haddock, however, dismissed the report as "a flagrant invention".

Captain Gambell said Virginian passed where Titanic sank "at a distance of six or seven miles", but could get no closer as "The ice was closely packed... and there would have been great danger in going nearer. No boats, packages or wreckage were to be seen." Gambell said Virginian steamed 162 nautical miles (300 km) toward Titanic, until at 1000 hrs Carpathia signalled Virginian "Turn back. Everything O. K. Have 800 on board. Return to your northern track".

=== Substitute for Empress of Ireland ===
On 29 May 1914 Canadian Pacific lost the liner RMS Empress of Ireland in a collision with the collier Storstad, and 1,024 people were killed. Canadian Pacific chartered Virginian from Allan Line to replace her. The charter was cut short by the First World War, which began on 28 July.

== First World War ==
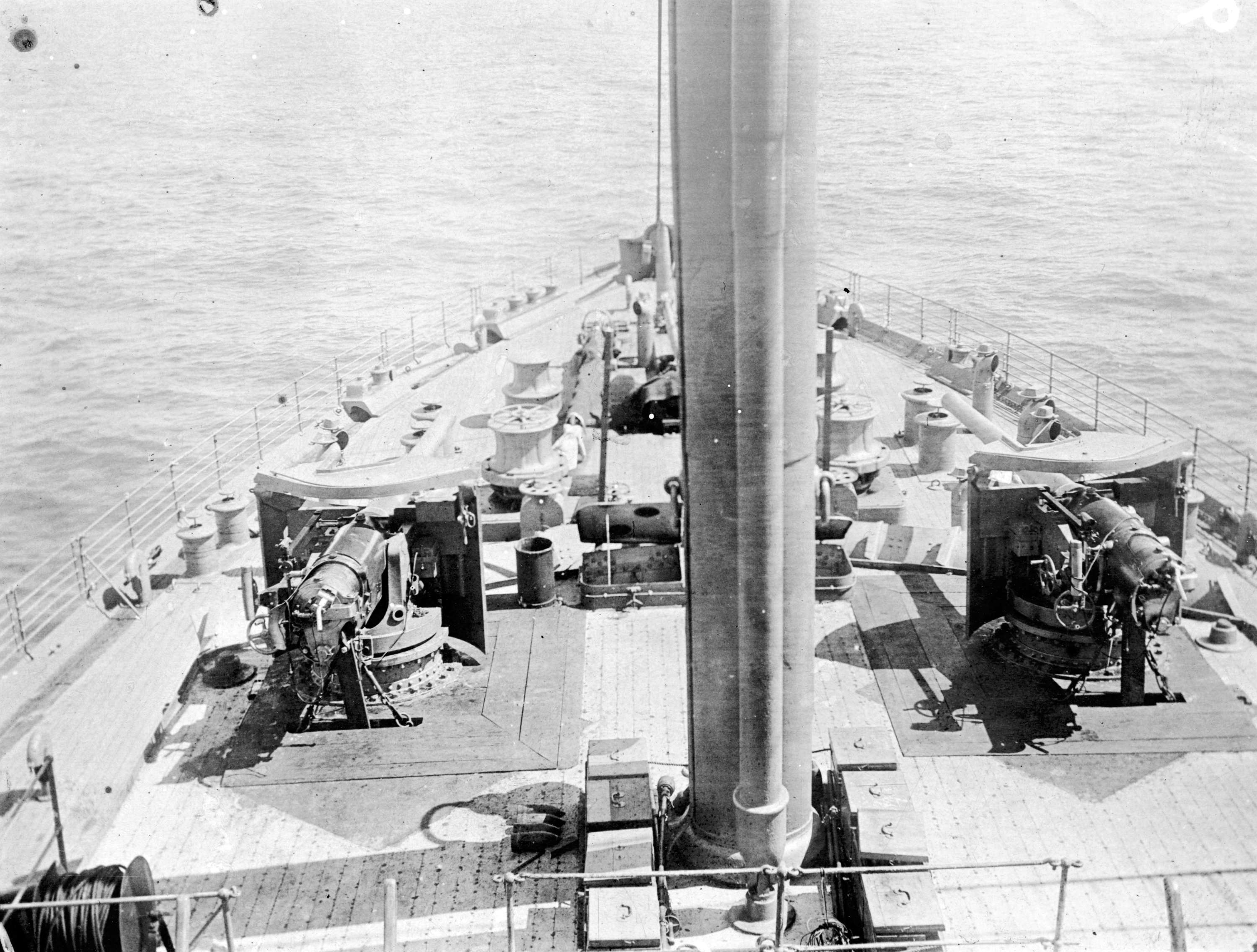
4.7-inch QF guns on the forecastle of an AMC in the First World War

From August 1914 the UK Government used Virginian as a troop ship. Then in December the British Admiralty requisitioned her and had her converted into an armed merchant cruiser (AMC). Initially her armament was eight 4.7-inch QF guns and her pennant number was M 72. She was commissioned as HMS Virginian on 10 December 1914.

Virginian joined the 10th Cruiser Squadron, with which she was on the Northern Patrol from December 1914 until the end of June 1917. She patrolled mostly around the Faroe Islands and the northern part of the Western Approaches. In 1915 she occasionally patrolled the Norwegian Sea and the east and south coasts of Iceland.

By October 1915 two of Virginian's 4.7-inch guns were replaced with six-pounder guns. On 16 June 1916 Virginian arrived in Canada Dock in Liverpool to have her remaining 4.7-inch guns replaced with six BL 6-inch and QF 6-inch naval guns. She was there for just over two months, until 18 August, and the Admiralty became concerned that the conversion took an inordinately long time.

By October 1916 Virginian's armament also included depth charges.

=== Convoy escort ===
From the beginning of July 1917 Virginian escorted transatlantic convoys.

On 19 August 1917 Virginian left Liverpool escorting a convoy, which called at Lough Swilly on 20–21 August. U-boats attacked the convoy off the coast of County Donegal. SM U-53 torpedoed Leyland Line's 10,418 GRT liner Devonian at 1152 hrs, and she sank at 1245 hrs about 20 nautical miles (37 km) northeast of Tory Island. U-53 also sank the Union Steamship Company's 8,238 GRT cargo liner Roscommon.

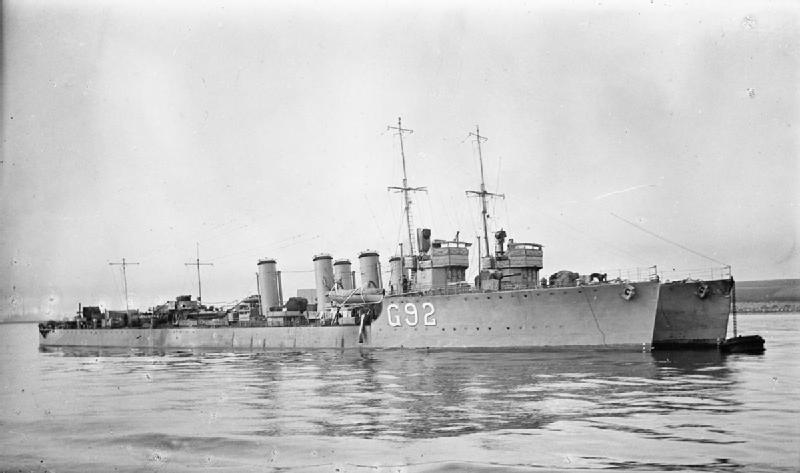
The destroyer HMS Rob Roy, which tried to assist after Virginian was torpedoed

At 1312 hrs Virginian sighted a periscope off her starboard bow and turned to engage the submarine. SM U-102 hit Virginian with a torpedo on her starboard quarter, killing three of her crew. The magazines for her six-inch guns and part of her number five hold were flooded, but Virginian remained afloat. Virginian tried to return to Lough Swilly, but found it very difficult to steer. The destroyer HMS Rob Roy tried to assist but failed. Nevertheless Virginian managed to reach Lough Swilly, and anchored at 2048 hrs.

Virginian underwent temporary repairs, and then on 4–5 September 1917 returned to Liverpool, where she was dry docked from 7 September until 16 November and returned to sea on 4 December.

In 1918 her pennant number was changed twice: to MI 95 in January and MI 52 in April. She continued to escort transatlantic convoys until just after the Armistice. She reached Liverpool on 30 November 1918 and was decommissioned some time thereafter.

Canadian Pacific had taken over Allan Line in 1917. The Admiralty released Virginian to her new owners, and in 1919 she was registered in Montreal.

== Drottningholm ==
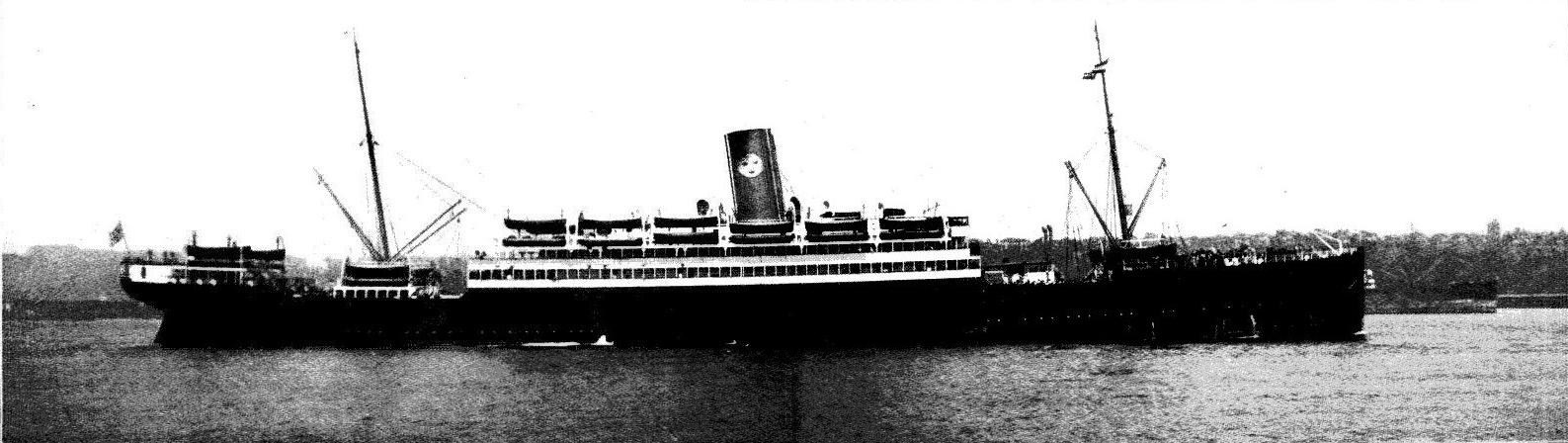
Drottningholm in 1922

In 1920 Swedish America Line bought Virginian, reportedly for the equivalent of $100,000, and renamed her Drottningholm, after a small community near Stockholm that includes the royal Drottningholm Palace. Götaverken in Gothenburg refitted Drottningholm, and particularly improved her third class accommodation. As refitted she had berths for 280 cabin class, 300 second class and 700 third class passengers. Drottningholm sailed from Gothenburg for the first time at the end of May, and arrived in New York for the first time on 9 June. She retained her notoriety for rolling, and her new name inspired the nickname "Rollingholm" or "Rollinghome".

SAL had carried significant numbers of Swedish migrants to the USA, but in the 1920s new US immigration laws affected the transatlantic trade. In May 1921 the Federal Government implemented the Emergency Quota Act, and allotted Sweden a quota for 20,000 migrants a year. Barely two months later, on 15 July, immigration authorities in New York detained 78 of Drottningholm's second-class passengers on arrival. After four hours a message from Washington, D.C. confirming that the quota for Sweden had not been fulfilled, and all 78 were allowed to land.

In 1922 Götaverken re-engined Drottningholm with new A/B De Lavals Ångturbin turbines. They were less powerful than her original Parsons turbines, because SAL wanted better fuel economy, but she could still do 17 knots (31 km/h). Götaverken also replaced her direct drive with single-reduction gearing, which at last solved her cavitation problem. At the same time Götaverken enlarged her superstructure by extending her bridge deck aft. Drottningholm returned to service in 1923.

By 1930 Drottningholm's tonnages were 11,055 GRT and 6,485 NRT. In 1934 her Swedish code letters KCMH were superseded by the call sign SJMA.

On 8 January 1935 while Drottningholm was docking in fog at West 57th Street Pier in New York a steel cable fouled one of her propellers. Her return sailing was deferred from 12 to 15 January to allow time for her to be repaired in dry dock.

In 1937 Drottningholm's hull was repainted white.

=== Notable passengers ===
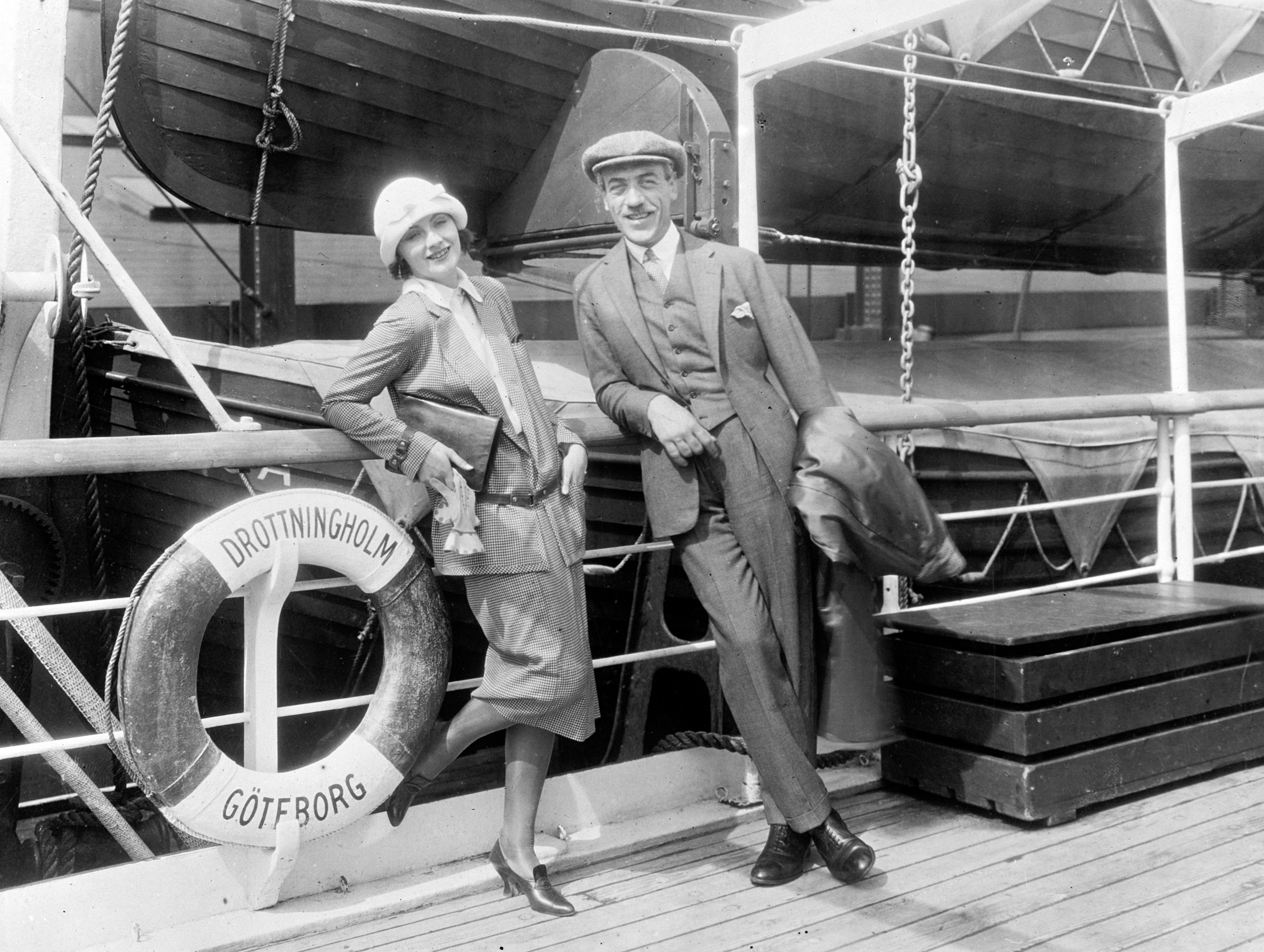
Greta Garbo and Mauritz Stiller aboard Drottningholm in summer 1925

In 1925 Greta Garbo and Mauritz Stiller sailed to the USA on Drottningholm, leaving Gothenburg on 26 June and arriving in New York 10 days later.

On 30 December 1928 the newly-wed Count and Countess Bernadotte left New York for Gothenburg on Drottningholm. The couple returned to the USA on Drottningholm in June 1933.

In 1932 Drottningholm took Swedish athletes home from the 1932 Summer Olympics in Los Angeles.

In January 1939, Niels Bohr sailed to the USA on Drottningholm, carrying with him the news about the discovery of nuclear fission.

=== Second World War ===
In the Second World War Sweden was neutral, and until December 1941 so was the USA. At first Drottningholm continued the service between Gothenburg and New York.

By the end of January 1940 Drottningholm was the only SAL passenger liner still operating between Gothenburg and New York. On 3 February, 150 Finnish-American and Finnish-Canadian volunteers to fight for Finland in the Winter War sailed on Drottningholm from New York.

In March 1940 Rabbi Yosef Yitzchak Schneersohn from German-occupied Poland reached New York aboard Drottningholm.

Later in the war the US, UK and French governments each chartered Drottningholm to repatriate civilian internees, prisoners of war (PoWs) and diplomats between the two belligerent sides. She also carried PoWs and civilians for the Red Cross.

One source states that Drottningholm repatriated 14,093 people. Another says she made 14 voyages and repatriated about 18,160 people. Another states that between 1940 and 1946 she made 30 voyages and carried about 25,000 people. The discrepancy may be because in August 1945 Drottningholm reverted from charter trips to her regular commercial Gothenburg – New York route, but she continued to carry refugees from Europe to North America.

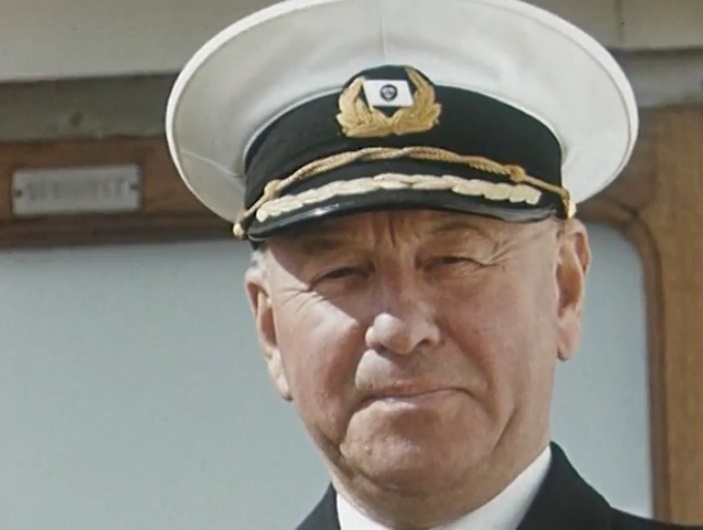
John Nordlander in 1954. He was Drottningholm's captain 1942–48

In March 1942 the US Department of State and US Maritime Commission chartered Drottningholm via an arrangement with Germany and the other Axis powers, facilitated by the Swiss and Swedish governments and with the cooperation of 15 Latin American republics who had also broken off diplomatic relations with the Axis. On her first eastbound voyage she left from New York on 7 May 1942 for Lisbon carrying Bulgarian, German, Italian, Romanian nationals including ambassadors and diplomats.

Her first westbound voyage was from Lisbon on 22 May, reaching New York on 1 June. Her passengers included the US diplomats Leland B. Morris and George F. Kennan.

Drottningholm started her second eastbound crossing from Jersey City on 3 June 1942 carrying 985 Axis nationals, including diplomats. On 12 June she reached Lisbon, where she was held to await trains from Axis countries carrying people for repatriation to the Americas. By 21 June she had embarked either 941 or 949 passengers at Lisbon for repatriation to both North and South America. Many had been released from Nazi concentration camps.

When Drottningholm reached New York on 30 June 1942, US immigration authorities and military and naval intelligence personnel came aboard and prevented her passengers from disembarking until they had searched the ship and questioned each of the passengers. They included 470 US citizens, 110 South American diplomats and nationals, and a group of Canadian women rescued from the Egyptian liner Zamzam, which the German auxiliary cruiser Atlantis had sunk in April 1941.

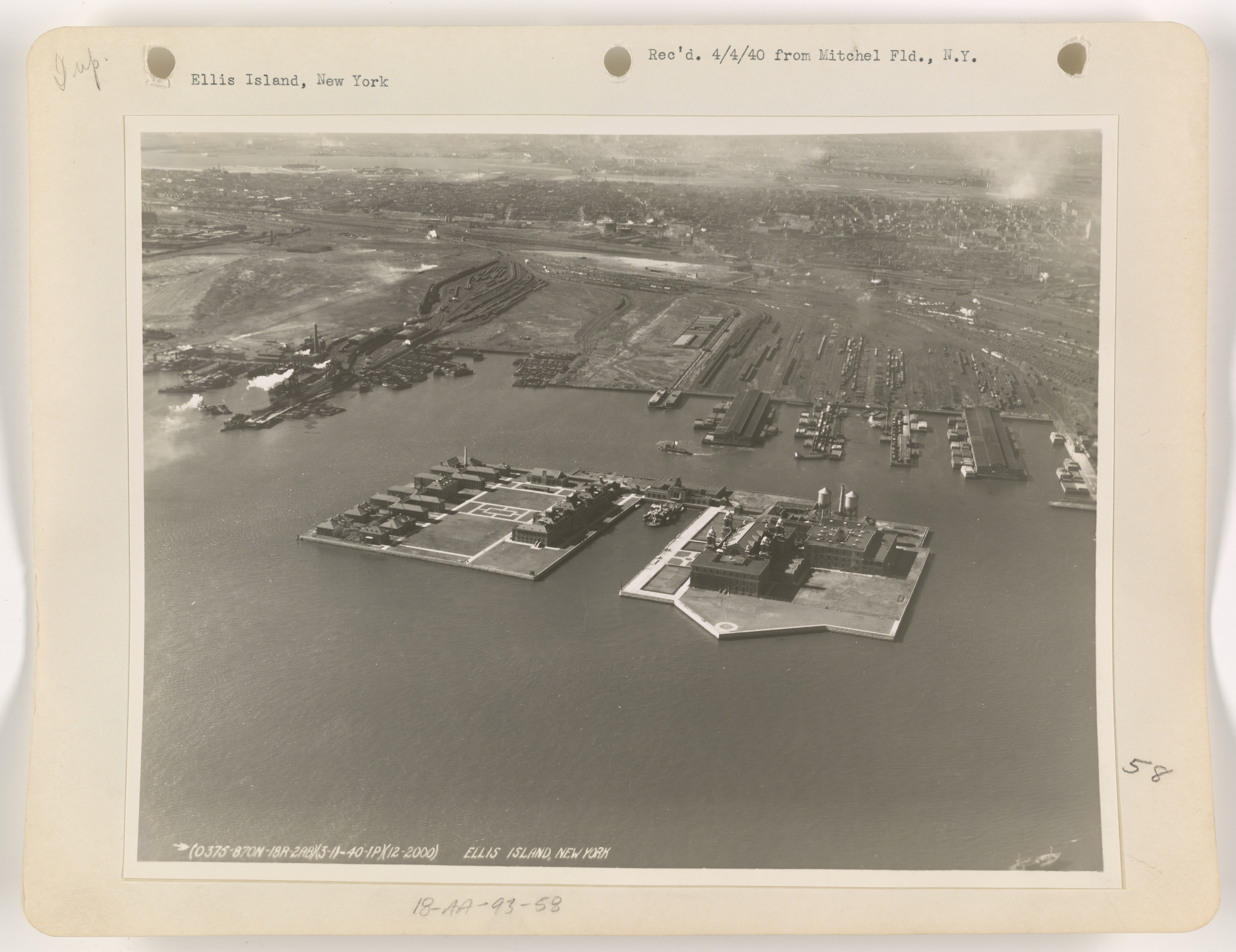
Ellis Island in the 1940s

US officials released about 125 passengers on 2 July and allowed them ashore. First to be released was the reporter Ruth Knowles, who had escaped execution by the Gestapo after spending a year serving with the Chetniks resisting the German and Italian occupation of Yugoslavia. By 3 July nearly 700 passengers were still being held aboard. and by 8 July about 400 had been released, but 300 had been detained on Ellis Island until their cases were decided.

At the end of June 1942 the Nazi government withdrew its guarantee of safe passage for the ship, which prevented further exchanges. On 15 July Drottningholm left New York for Gothenburg carrying at least 800 Axis nationals. Most were German or Italian, plus a few Bulgarians and Romanians.

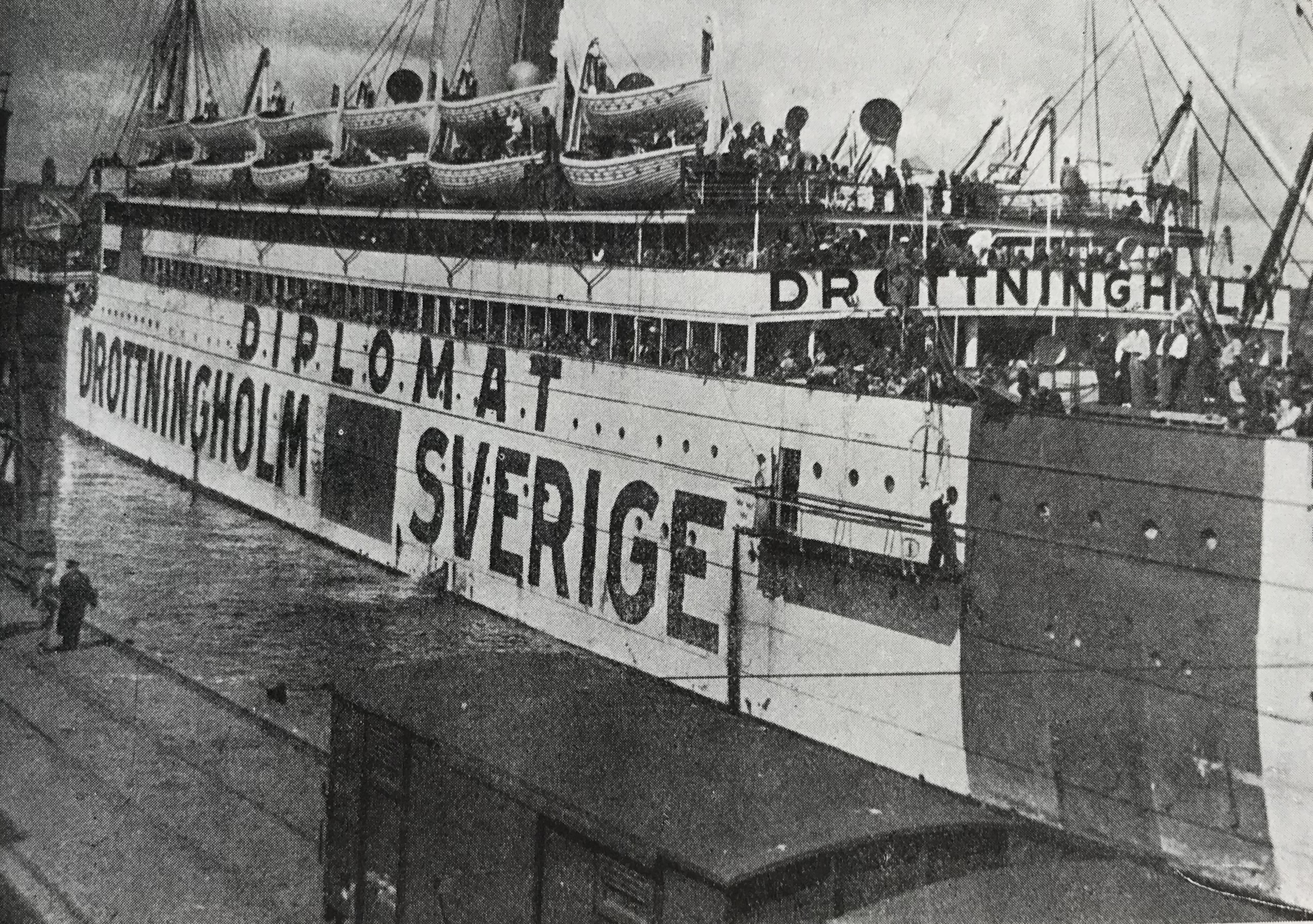
Drottningholm in Gothenburg in 1943 or 1944

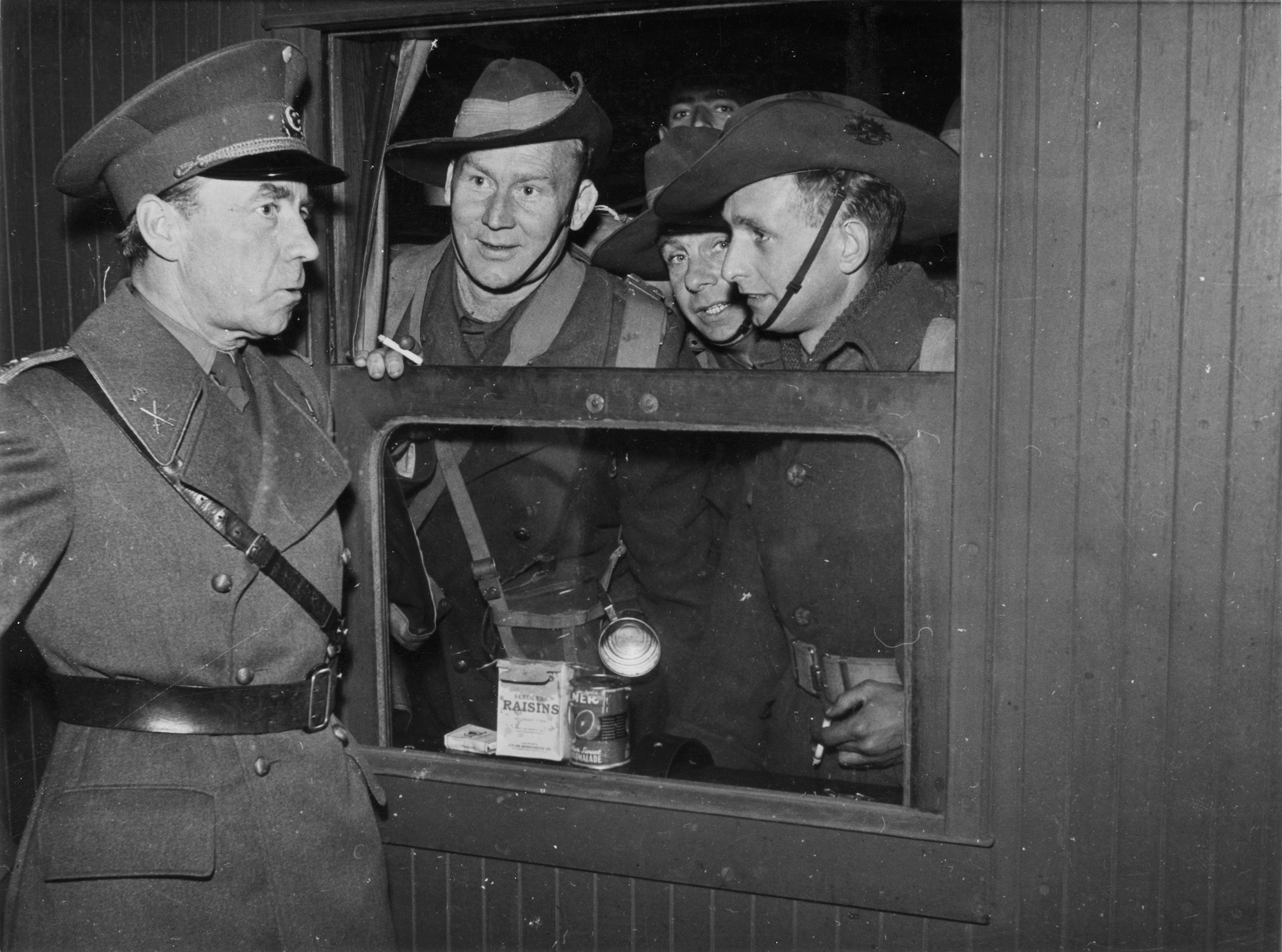
Swedish Red Cross Vice Chairman Count Bernadotte (left) in Gothenburg in October 1943, meeting Australian Army PoWs on a train before their repatriation by sea

Drottningholm continued to serve the UK and French governments as a repatriation ship. Her white hull was emblazoned on both sides with her name and "Sverige" ("Sweden") in huge capital letters, between them were stripes of blue and yellow, the colours of the Swedish flag, and above them was the word "Diplomat". As a neutral ship she was fully lit so that her markings could be easily seen. By 1945 the word "Diplomat" had been replaced with "Freigeleit – Protected".

In October 1943 Drottningholm and Empress of Russia arrived in the Firth of Forth carrying a total of about 4,000 Allied PoWs. They nicknamed Drottningholm "Trotting Home".

On 15 or 16 March 1944 Drottningholm reached Jersey City from Lisbon with 662 passengers including 160 civilian internees from Vittel internment camp, 35 or 36 wounded US servicemen and a group of US diplomats from the former Vichy France, which Germany and Italy had occupied since November 1942. Internees released from Vittel included Mary Berg and her family. Drottningholm's previous eastbound voyage had returned about 750 Germans to Europe.

In summer 1944 the Swiss government facilitated an agreement between the German and UK governments to repatriate almost all of each other's interned civilian nationals. Drottningholm was chartered, and on 11 July reached Lisbon carrying 900 German nationals who had been interned in South Africa. She was then to await three trains carrying UK nationals from German-occupied Europe. 900 UK civilians and PoWs were brought by train under International Red Cross protection from German-occupied countries to Lisbon.

However, by summer 1944 the French Resistance was at its height, sabotaging rail and road transport in France, and especially in the southwest toward the Spanish frontier. The trains had left Germany on 6 July but were struggling to cross France. By 16 July the trains still had not arrived, so the UK was threatening to return the German internees to South Africa on Drottningholm. However, on 21 July trains carrying 414 UK and other evacuees from Germany reached Irun on the Spanish frontier, where they changed to Spanish trains to continue toward Lisbon. On 4 August Drottningholm at last left Lisbon taking them to England.

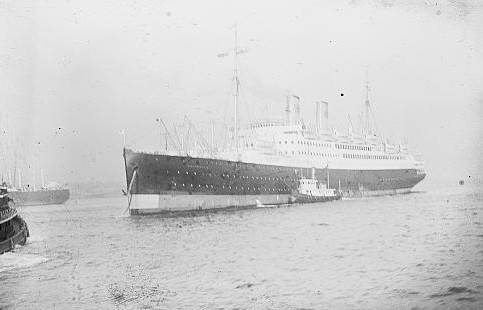
SAL's Gripsholm also repatriated nationals from both sides of the war

In September 1944 the Swedish Red Cross arranged an exchange of 2,345 Allied PoWs for a similar number of Germans. The Allied PoWs would be brought by sea and land to Gothenburg, where they would embark on Drottningholm, Gripsholm and the UK troop ship Arundel Castle. When the Allied prisoners reached Gothenburg their number was reported to be 2,600.

In March 1945 the UK and Germany agreed via Swiss and Swedish intermediaries to another exchange of civilian internees via Drottningholm. On 15 March she left Gothenburg carrying UK internees, Argentinian and Turkish diplomats, Portuguese nationals and 212 released Channel Islands internees. She had landed the Channel Islands and UK nationals in Liverpool by 23 March and was then due to take the Argentinians and Portuguese to Lisbon and the Turks to Istanbul. On 11 April she arrived in Istanbul, carrying 137 Turkish Jews who had been released from Ravensbrück and Bergen-Belsen concentration camps as part of a prisoner exchange. Turkish authorities temporarily refused entry to 119 of her passengers.

On 3 May, the eve of the German unconditional surrender, Drottningholm was in Lisbon where she was meant to embark 200 Germans to be repatriated. But 61 of them refused to go, and the Portuguese authorities were reported to be assessing them as civilian refugees.

=== Post-war service ===
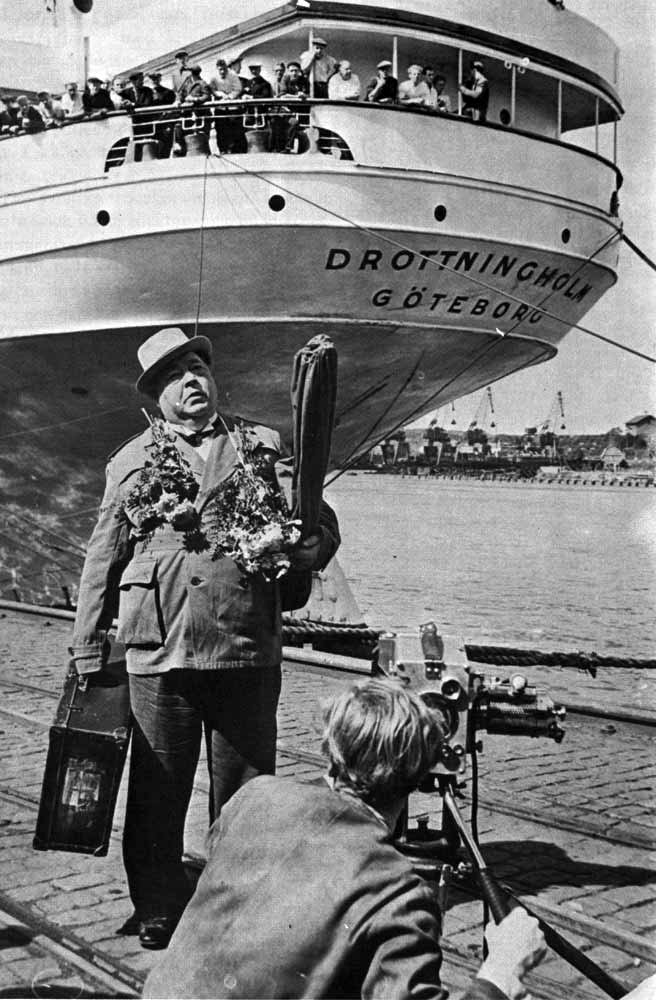
Swedish actor and singer Edvard Persson at Gothenburg in August 1946, about to board Drottningholm

Drottningholm started a Gothenburg – Liverpool – New York service in late August 1945 and was expected to reach Gothenburg from New York by this route for the first time on 6 September.

On 22 July 1946 Drottningholm completed her first radar-equipped voyage from Gothenburg to New York. That August Drottningholm and Gripsholm resumed a fortnightly direct service between Gothenburg and New York.

On 16 September 1946 Drottningholm was in the middle of a New York labour dispute. 24 police officers encircled 10 National Maritime Union pickets to separate them from International Longshoremen's Association men who crossed the picket line to work the ship.

On 29 October 1946 SAL announced that at the end of the year it would sell Drottningholm and that her buyers would register her in Panama and operate her between Genoa and Argentina. However, the sale depended on Drottningholm's replacement, the 12,165 GRT Stockholm, being completed and entering service in time. Stockholm had been launched on 6 September but did not enter service until February 1948, which delayed Drottningholm's sale. The sale price was not disclosed, but was reported to be in the order of $1,000,000.

By February 1948 Drottningholm was recorded as having made 220 transatlantic crossings for SAL, carried 192,735 transatlantic passengers and taken 12,882 people on cruises. She was also reported to have taken part in four rescues at sea, including two from Norwegian ships called Solglimt and Isefjell.

Drottningholm's final westbound crossing for SAL took 11 days. She weathered three storms, was forced to heave to for 43 hours and was covered with ice when she reached New York two days late on 11 February 1948. Her Master, John Nordlander, called it the worst passage he had had in 350 Atlantic crossings. The ship left New York for her final eastbound crossing as Drottningholm on 13 February.

== Home Lines ==
The company that bought Drottningholm in 1948, renamed her Brasil and registered her in Panama is variously reported to have been the Panamanian Navigation Company or South American Lines. It was associated with the Italian Home Lines, and SAL was a major shareholder. Brasil's new route was between Genoa and Rio de Janeiro.

In 1951 the ship was refitted in Italy with modern, more spacious accommodation for fewer passengers, and reduced tonnage. Her ownership was transferred to Mediterranean Lines, Hamburg America Line chartered her, renamed her Homeland and put her on a route between Hamburg and New York via Southampton and Halifax, NS.

In 1952 the ship was transferred to the route between Genoa and New York via Naples and Barcelona. From 1953 she was owned directly by Home Lines.

The ship served for half a century. When built she was a technological pioneer. In one world war she was a warship and survived being torpedoed. In another she was a peace ship and did notable humanitarian work. By the end of her career was the oldest liner in scheduled transatlantic service.

In 1955 she was sold to the Società Italiana di Armamento (Sidarma), who scrapped her at Trieste. The liner was 50 years old by then and, other than the shore tender SS Nomadic, was the last surviving ship in connection with the Titanic incident as well as the last former member of the Allan Line.

== Bibliography ==
- Guttstadt, Corry (2013). Turkey, the Jews, and the Holocaust. Cambridge: Cambridge University Press. ISBN 978-0-521-76991-4.
- Harris, Roger E (1980). Islanders deported. Vol. Part 1. ISBN 978-0-902633-63-6.
- McCrorie, Ian (1986). Clyde Pleasure Steamers: An Illustrated History. Greenock: Orr, Pollock. ISBN 1-869850-00-9.
- Maber, John M (1980). Channel packets and ocean liners, 1850–1970. The Ship. Vol. 6. Edinburgh: HMSO. ISBN 0-11-290316-9.
- The Marconi Press Agency Ltd (1913). The Year Book of Wireless Telegraphy and Telephony. London: The St Katherine Press.
- Miller, William H Jr (2001). Picture History of British Ocean Liners 1900 to the Present. Mineola: Dover Publications. ISBN 0-486-41532-5.
- Wilson, RM (1956). The Big Ships. London: Cassell & Co.
