= SS Anglo Saxon (1856) =

Coordinates: 46°43′10.11″N 53°2′54.06″W

History

United Kingdom
- Name: Anglo Saxon
- Owner: J & A Allan & Co., Glasgow
- Operator: Montreal Ocean Steamship Company
- Builder: William Denny and Brothers, Dumbarton, Scotland
- Yard number: 56
- Launched: 1856
- Fate: Wrecked 27 April 1863

General characteristics
- Tonnage: 1,700 GRT
- Length: 283 ft (86 m)
- Beam: 35 ft 2 in (10.72 m)
- Draught: 16 ft 2 in (4.93 m)
- Propulsion: Compound steam engines, 250 hp (186 kW)
- Speed: 13.5 knots (25.0 km/h; 15.5 mph)

SS Anglo Saxon was an iron screw steam ship belonging to the Montreal Ocean Steamship Company which was wrecked with great loss of life on the Newfoundland coast on 27 April 1863.

== Ship history ==
Anglo Saxon was built by William Denny and Brothers of Dumbarton, Scotland, in 1856, and operated on the Liverpool-Canada route.

On her final voyage she was commanded by Captain William Burgess. She sailed from Liverpool for Quebec on 16 April 1863, with a total of 445 aboard; 360 passengers and 85 crew. On 27 April, in dense fog, she ran aground in Clam Cove about four miles north of Cape Race. The ship broke up within an hour of hitting the rocks, and sank. Of those on board 237 people died, making this one of Canada's worst shipwrecks.

Among those saved was Anne Bertram, sister of John Bertram and George Hope Bertram, both later Canadian Members of Parliament, who was travelling with Charlotte Hope, daughter of Scots agriculturalist, George Hope.
