= SS Pretorian =

British ocean liner (1900–1926)

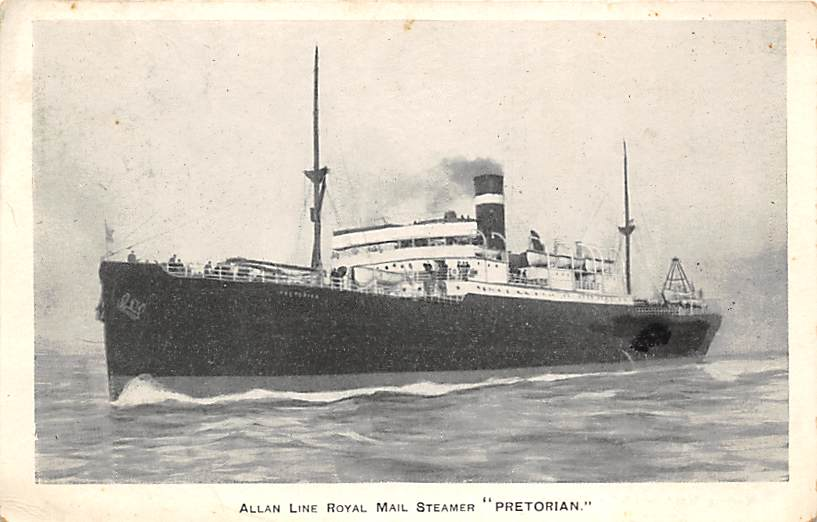
- Postcard of the SS Pretorian

History
- Namesake: Praetorian Guard
- Operator: Allan Line (1900–1917); Canadian Pacific Steamship Company (1917–1922)
- Port of registry: (United Kingdom) Glasgow, Scotland
- Route: Liverpool - Quebec - Montreal; Glasgow - Halifax - Boston
- Builder: Furness, Withy & Co.
- Maiden voyage: 8 August 1901
- Out of service: 1922
- Identification: Marconi call sign: MFN
- Fate: Scrapped in 1926

General characteristics
- Type: Passenger liner
- Tonnage: 6,948 GRT (before 1908); 7,654 GRT (after 1908)
- Length: 436 feet
- Beam: 53 feet
- Propulsion: Single-screw, Triple expansion engines
- Speed: 14 knots
- Capacity: 140 first-class, 200 second-class, 600 steerage

SS Pretorian was a British passenger steamship of the Allan Line and then Canadian Pacific Line. Launched in 1900, she was built by Furness, Withy & Co. in West Hartlepool, England. She made her maiden voyage in August 1901, sailing from Liverpool to Montreal.

== Features ==
The Pretorian had one funnel and two masts and was rigged as a two-masted fore-and-aft schooner. Built as an immigrant cargo ship, she had passenger accommodation for 140 first class, 200 second, and 600 steerage. The Pretorian had a cellular double bottom, and the hull was divided into eight watertight compartments by means of seven bulkheads fitted in accordance with the Board of Trade requirements for passenger steamers. The vessel also had six large cargo hatches, twelve steam winches which could handle cargo shipments.

== History ==
By 1910, the Pretorian had been equipped for submarine signalling and wireless telegraphy. The Marconi Company supplied and operated her wireless. Her call sign was MFN. One of her earliest wireless operators was Jack Phillips, who would later be Chief Operator aboard RMS Titanic and later died when the ship sank on her ill-fated maiden voyage.

The Pretorian served the Liverpool-Quebec-Montreal route during the summer months and the Glasgow-Halifax-Boston route during the winter months. She remained on the Glasgow-Boston route even after being taken over by the Canadian Pacific Line. She was deemed unfit for service in 1922 and was scrapped in 1926.
