= Bordeaux, South Carolina =

Settlement in South Carolina, United States

Coordinates: 33°55′35″N 82°25′14″W

Bordeaux is an unincorporated community in McCormick County, in the U.S. state of South Carolina.

== History ==
The first permanent settlement at Bordeaux was made in 1764. The community was originally built up by French Huguenot settlers, who named it after their native home in Bordeaux, France. Variant names are "French Town" and "New Bordeaux". A post office called Bordeaux was established in 1837, and remained in operation until 1942.

In 1925, Bordeaux had 335 inhabitants.
