= List of ships named Stockholm =

Ships named after Stockholm include:

- SS Stockholm, an ocean liner used by the Swedish American Line 1915–1928
- MS Stockholm (1938), an ocean liner ordered by the Swedish American Line but destroyed in a fire before being completed
- MS Stockholm (1940), an ocean liner of the same design as above, completed for the Swedish American Line but sold to the Italian government, becoming a troopship
- MS Stockholm (1946), an ocean liner used by the Swedish American Line 1948–1959; collided with the SS Andrea Doria in 1956; as of 2020 sailing as MV Astoria
- HSwMS Stockholm, several ships of the Swedish Navy
