= John Nordlander =

Swedish sea captain (1894–1961)

John Nordlander RVO, RDO, SGM
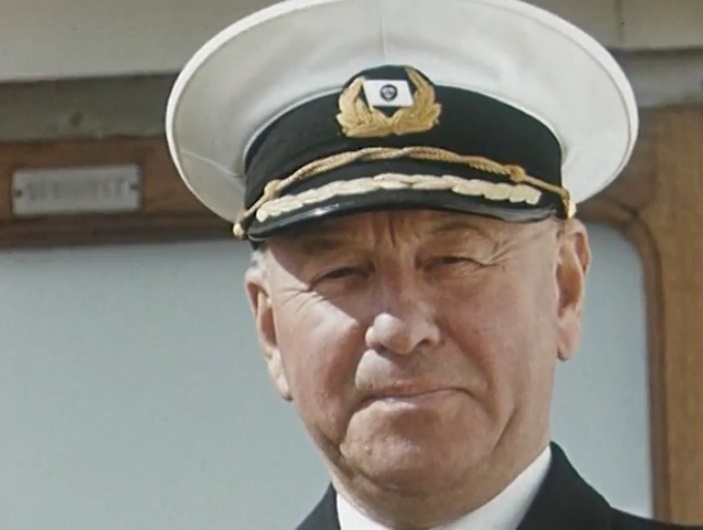
- Captain John Nordlander aboard MS Kungsholm (1954) (Swedish Television)
- Born: 1894; Härnösand, Sweden
- Died: 1961 (aged 66–67); Gothenburg, Sweden
- Occupation: sea captain
- Employer(s): Swedish American Line; Swedish Navy
- Organization: Red Cross

John Leonard Nordlander (1894–1961) was a Swedish sea captain and Commander commissioned by the shipping line Swedish American Line, crossing the Atlantic Ocean 532 times.

During World War II, while serving as Master of SS Drottningholm, Captain Nordlander was responsible for rescuing thousands of victims of war uniquely through hostile waters in collaboration with the Red Cross and effectively with the Allied powers, with approval of the Swedish royal family.

== Biography ==
John Nordlander was born in 1894 in Härnösand, Västernorrland County, Sweden, to a family of seafarers, and was educated there as a captain.

Initially serving in the Swedish Navy and aboard international sailing ships, Nordlander was first educated as a First Officer in Härnösand and then as a Captain at the Marine Officer's School of Gothenburg.

Nordlander died in 1961 in Gothenburg and was buried there at Östra kyrkogården.

== Swedish American Line ==
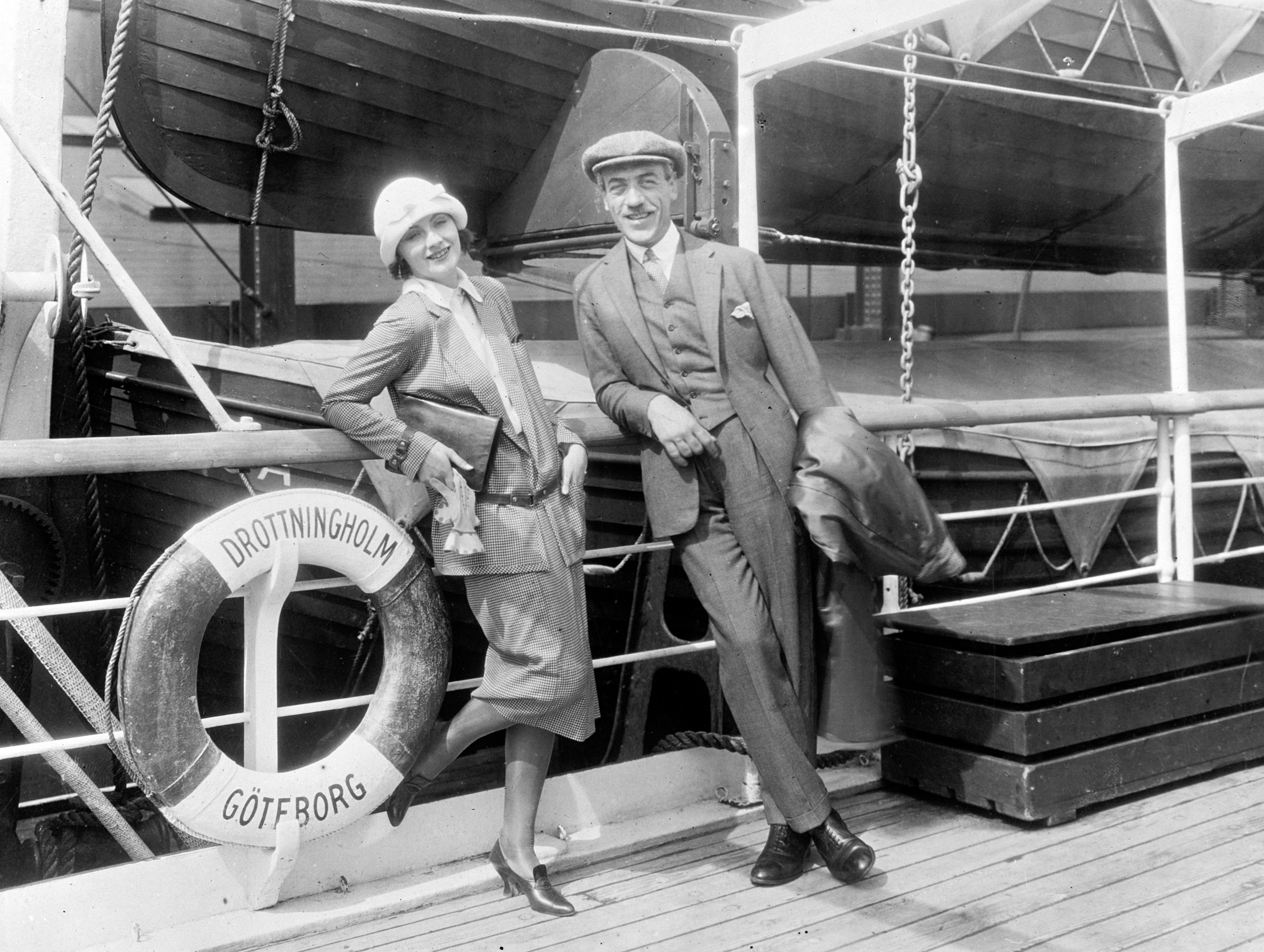
Greta Garbo and Mauritz Stiller aboard SS Drottningholm in 1925 en route to the United States

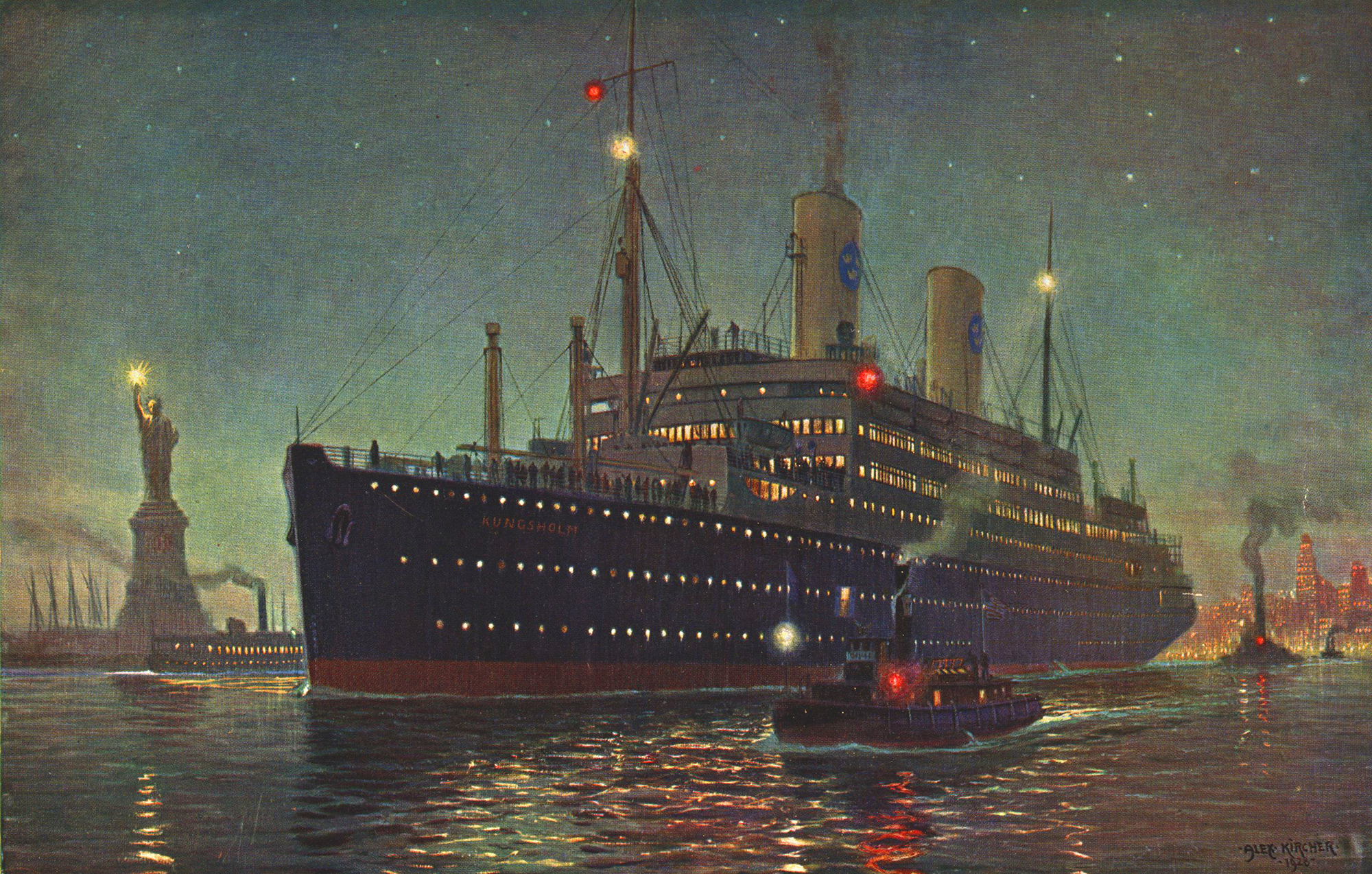
MS Kungsholm in painting (1928) by Alexander Kircher (1867–1939)

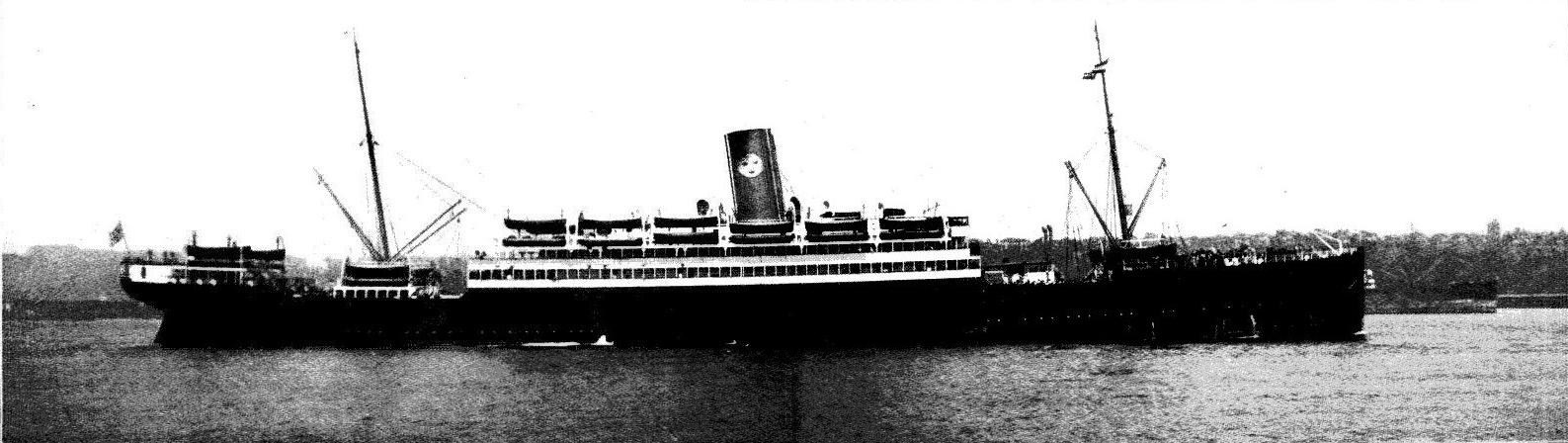
SS Drottningholm (1922)

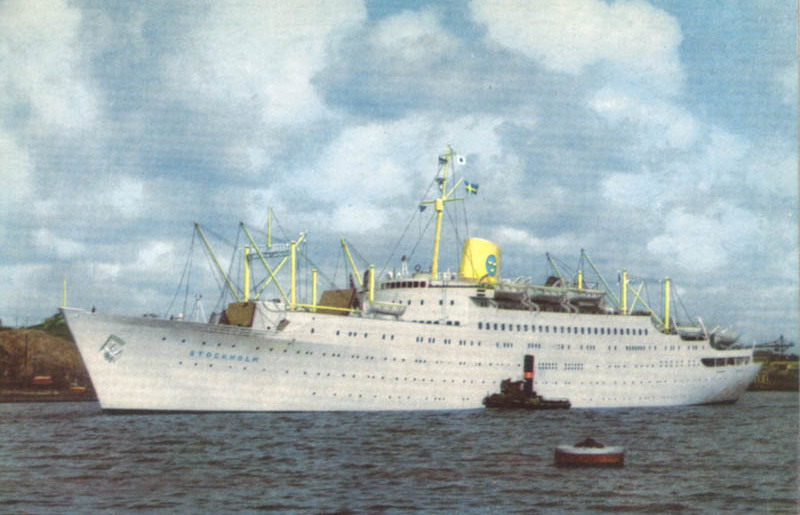
MS Stockholm (1952)

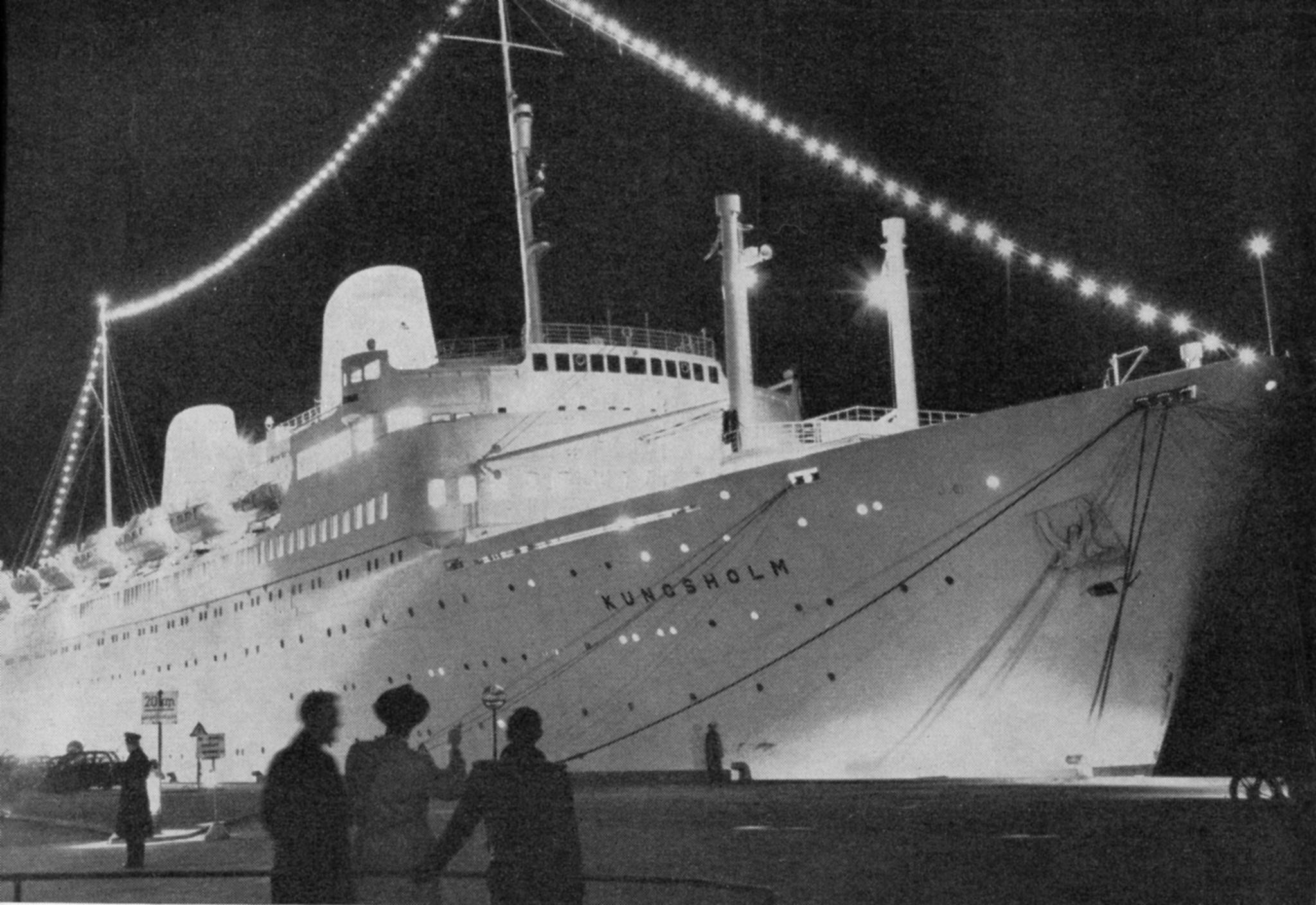
MS Kungsholm

Nordlander was commissioned by the Swedish American Line in 1920 and subsequently served as naval officer on all its ships on transatlantic cruises as well as in other directions, including the West Indies. Ships that Nordlander commanded include:

- MS Kungsholm (1941, 1942, 1947), as John Ericsson (1947)
- MS Gripsholm
- SS Drottningholm (1942–1948)
- MS Stockholm (1948–1953, 1954), later renamed MV Astoria
- MS Kungsholm Flagship 1953–1954, 1955–1957

Besides his war activities, later in his career Nordlander was also directed other rescue missions. Among these were the 1950 incident of the Norwegian ship Crown Prince Olav which caught fire off Halland, on the west coast of Sweden. Despite no visibility due to heavy fog, helped only by radar, Nordlander managed to find and tow the deteriorating ship and her 120 passengers safely to the nearest port. In 1955, Nordlander rescued the British 7,130 GRT MV Argobeam which caught fire off Ireland.

== World War II ==
Nordlander served throughout World War II.

=== US ship requisition in New York ===
In 1942 after the USA entered World War II, MS Kungsholm, commanded by Nordlander, was seized at New York City, compulsorily purchased by the United States government for the War Shipping Administration, converted into a troop ship and registered under the US flag.

=== Allied prisoner exchanges and rescue missions ===
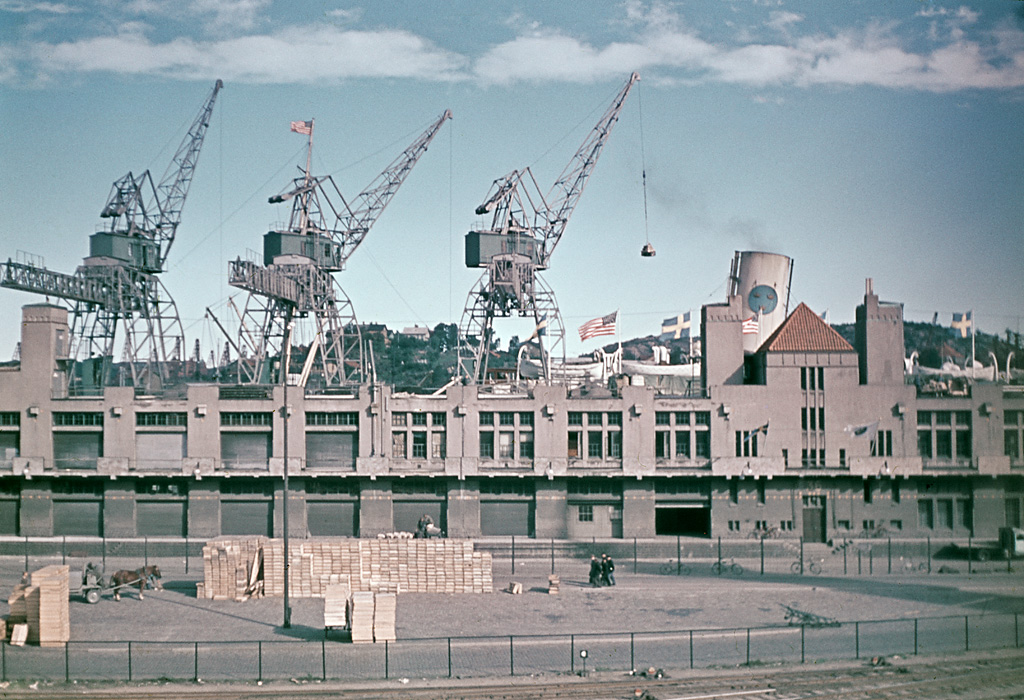
Stigbergskajen quay in Gothenburg, Sweden, where the steamships of the Swedish American Line moored under Swedish and American flags, and the port terminal "The American Shed" (1944).

After the purchase of his former ship, Nordlander was appointed Master of SS Drottningholm 1942–1948, carrying out several prisoner transport missions, totalling thousands of displaced victims and prisoners of war, notably in collaboration with the Red Cross. Under signs such as "Freigeleit – Protected, Drottningholm Sweden", she was one of the few ships that sailed hostile waters with all lights shining at night.

In 1942 Drottningholm's sides were marked "Diplomat – Drottningholm Sverige" when carrying disabled prisoners of war, victims of Nazi concentration camps and diplomats from Liverpool, United Kingdom, to North America.

In September 1944 she was deployed by the Red Cross to transport prisoners of war and civilians being repatriated from Nazi Germany to the United Kingdom via Sweden.

Another voyage in April 1945 docked in Liverpool that included 212 ex-interned Channel Islanders. One of the voyages is indicated to have safely relocated 1,362 individuals at once.

Probably for security reasons, we do not take the most direct route, but skirt around the west of Ireland. Liverpool is in the morning mist. From afar we hear the sirens of the boats that welcome. A huge crowd and happy jostling on the quay. The harbor is decorated with banners and flags. Emotions run high among the passengers. Then finally, when we drop anchor, a military band welcomed us by playing "God Save the King" and popular tunes.

— Mr Donald Prager about his voyage from Lisbon to Liverpool in August 1944, aboard Drottningholm

We were a day or two aboard this vessel glorying in our new found freedom. Bands were sent down to the quayside to play for us and generally we were made very much at ease. The Crown Princess came aboard and moved amongst us. [...] We left the Swedish harbour to the strains of both our national anthems and set course for home. Guided through the Skaggerak, then into the North Sea with only water between us and Britain. A few days more and we were within our own territorial waters. Then Leith and the pipe band to welcome us. We were home!

— Alistair Crawford Cameron MacRitchie, Medical Orderly in the Royal Army Medical Corps

== In popular culture ==
In tribute to the vessel under Nordlander's command, a short illustrated movie, The S.S. Drottningholm (2014), was produced by Molly DeVries about her ancestors, the Jewish-American concert pianist Walter Hautzig and writer Esther Hautzig. The two belonged to and met among the thousands of passengers on rescue missions aboard Drottningholm, and later got married.

== Distinctions ==
- Sweden: Knight 1st Class of the Order of Vasa (1945)
- Denmark: Knight of the Order of the Dannebrog
- Finland: Order of the Lion of Finland
- United Kingdom: Sea Gallantry Medal in Silver for Saving Life at Sea (1956) by Queen Elizabeth II for the rescue mission of Argobeam
- United States: World War II Victory Medal
- Sweden: Emmery Medal of the Royal Patriotic Society
- Delaware: Medal of Delaware
- Sweden: Medal of Merit Plaque of the Swedish Sea Rescue Society
- Sweden: Medal of Merit of the Red Cross in Sweden, conferred by King Gustaf V for his "humanitarian efforts during SS Drottningholm's transports during wartime"
- Cuba: Order of Merit and Honour of the Cuban Red Cross
