= Stockholm (disambiguation) =

Stockholm is the capital of Sweden and can refer to the city proper, as well as several different geographical and administrative divisions in and around the city:

- Stockholm City Centre
- Stockholm Municipality (City of Stockholm)
- Stockholm County, the county containing the city of Stockholm
- Metropolitan Stockholm, a metropolitan area consisting of municipalities within the county
- Stockholm urban area, the central urban area of Metropolitan Stockholm
- Stockholm (National Area), a European Union statistical region

Stockholm may also refer to:

== Places ==
=== Canada ===
- Stockholm, Saskatchewan

=== Sweden ===
- Stockholm, a small village in Ronneby Municipality, Blekinge County
- Stockholm, a small village in Perstorp Municipality, Skåne County

=== United States ===
- Stockholm Township, Crawford County, Iowa
- Stockholm, Maine
- Stockholm, Minnesota
- Stockholm Township, Minnesota
- Stockholm, New Jersey
- Stockholm, New York
- Stockholm, South Dakota
- Stockholm, Wisconsin
- Stockholm (town), Wisconsin
- Bridgeport, New Jersey, formerly known as New Stockholm

== Ships ==
- SS Stockholm, an ocean liner used by the Swedish American Line 1915–1928
- MS Stockholm (1938), an ocean liner ordered by the Swedish American Line but destroyed in a fire before being completed
- MS Stockholm (1940), an ocean liner of the same design as above, completed for the Swedish American Line but sold to the Italian government, becoming a troopship
- MS Stockholm (1946), an ocean liner used by the Swedish American Line 1948–1959; collided with the SS Andrea Doria in 1956; as of 2020 sailing as MV Astoria
- HSwMS Stockholm, several ships of the Swedish Navy
- Stockholm-class corvette

== Arts and entertainment ==
=== Film ===
- Stockholm (2013 film), a 2013 Spanish film
- Stockholm (2018 film), a 2018 Swedish-Canadian film
- Stockholm, Pennsylvania, 2015 American film

=== Television ===
- Stockholm (TV series), Israeli television series (2018–2020)

=== Music ===
- Stockholm Monsters, an English post-punk band
- Stockholm Records, a Swedish record label
- Stockholm (Jean-Louis Aubert album), 1997
- Stockholm (The Triffids album), 1990
- Stockholm (Chrissie Hynde album), 2014
- Stockholm & Göteborg, a 2008 album by Henry Cow
- "Stockholm" (instrumental), an instrumental composition released by Lawrence Welk and His Orchestra in 1964
- "Stockholm" (song), a 1992 single released by Orup
- "Stockholm", a single by the UK indie rock band New Fast Automatic Daffodils
- "Stockholm", a song by Benjamin Ingrosso from En gång i tiden (del 2)

== Other uses ==
- Stockholm Convention, an international agreement on reducing persistent organic pesticides
- Stockholm format, a text-based multiple sequence alignment format
- Stockholm syndrome, a psychological phenomenon
- Stockholm tar, a waterproofing agent and veterinary topical medicine
- Stockholm City (newspaper), a former free daily newspaper
- .stockholm, the Internet top-level domain for Stockholm
