= MV Derrycunihy =

Derrycunihy was the name of a number of ships operated by McCowan & Gross Ltd, including:

- MV Derrycunihy (1943), sunk during the Normandy Landings
- MV Derrycunihy (1945), in service from 1946–52
