= Karageorgis (shipping company) =

International shipping line

- Founded: 1930; 96 years ago
- Founder: Michail A. Karageorgis

Karageorgis (Greek: Καραγιώργη) was an international shipping line founded by Michail A. Karageorgis, in Greece in between 1930 and 1934. It operated under the names Michail A. Karageorgis S.A., Karageorgis Lines, and Karageorgis Cruises.

== History ==
The company was founded by Michail Karageorgis (Μιχαήλ Αριστομένη Καραγεώργη)[1899-1995] in 1934 with the acquisition of his first ship Roula. In 1962, his son Aristomenis Karageorgis (1933 - 2014) would take over the company.

In 1969, Harima Heavy Industries of Japan ordered three tankers from Karageorgis, scheduled to be delivered in March, April, and July 1972.

In March 1971, it was reported Karageorgis planned to set up a shipyard and steel plant in the port of Pylos Navarino.

In an interview with Nautical Chronicles on March 15, Michail revealed the companies plans to pursue passenger business. In September 1971, Karageorgis purchased four used cargo-passenger liners from the Ellerman Lines for £1,250,000. Later that year, it was discussed whether Karageorgis, or Chandris Line would buy Cunard Line's out dated ships. The first of the Ellerman ships to relaunch under Karageorgis was announced to be Mediterranean Sea, the former City of Exeter.

In September 1973, an order was placed to the Canadian shipbuilding company Marine Industries, for six new cargo vessels.

In December 1973, Karageorgis placed an order for five tankers to the Finnish company Wartsila.

The plans for development in Pylos was approved by the Greek government, and was supported by the local villagers. However environmentalists protested the project, and the Archaeological counsel rejected the plans on June 17, 1975.

In December 1975, the company bought the MS Gripsholm from the Swedish American Line to add to their fleet of passenger vessels. She was renamed the Navarino.

In January 1976, it was reported Karageorgis ordered ten (17,000 ton) new cargo vessels from Marine Industries in Canada.

On July 6, 1976, the company was incorporated in the United Kingdom.

On Friday night, August 7, 1981, while sailing a mile south of the Aegean island Patmos, the Navarino ran aground on rocks. It was decided to sell the Navarino to Commodore Cruise Lines in September 1981. But the sale was canceled after the ship, while in dry-dock, tipped over, collapsing the wall, flooding the ship. The prospective sale fell through, and the Navarino stayed in an Athens shipyard until purchased by Regency Cruises in 1985.

The company dissolved in the late 1990s, with its last ship New Empress - a chemical tanker - being sold in 1997, after being under arrest since November 1996.

== Ships of Karageorgis ==
Name	Built	KL Service	Notes
Aristanax			
Aristandros	1972		
Mediterranean Dolphin	1953	1971-197?	ex City of Durban. Scrapped.
Mediterranean Sea	1953	1971-	ex City of Exeter. Scrapped.
Mediterranean Sky	1953	1971–1996	ex City of York. Capsized in 2003.
Mediterranean Sun / Island	1953	1971-?	ex City of Port Elizabeth. Scrapped.
Navarino	1957	1975-1984	ex MS Gripsholm. Sold to Regency Cruises.
New Empress	1971	1971-1996	Sold 1997.
