= MS Kungsholm (1952) =

Ship

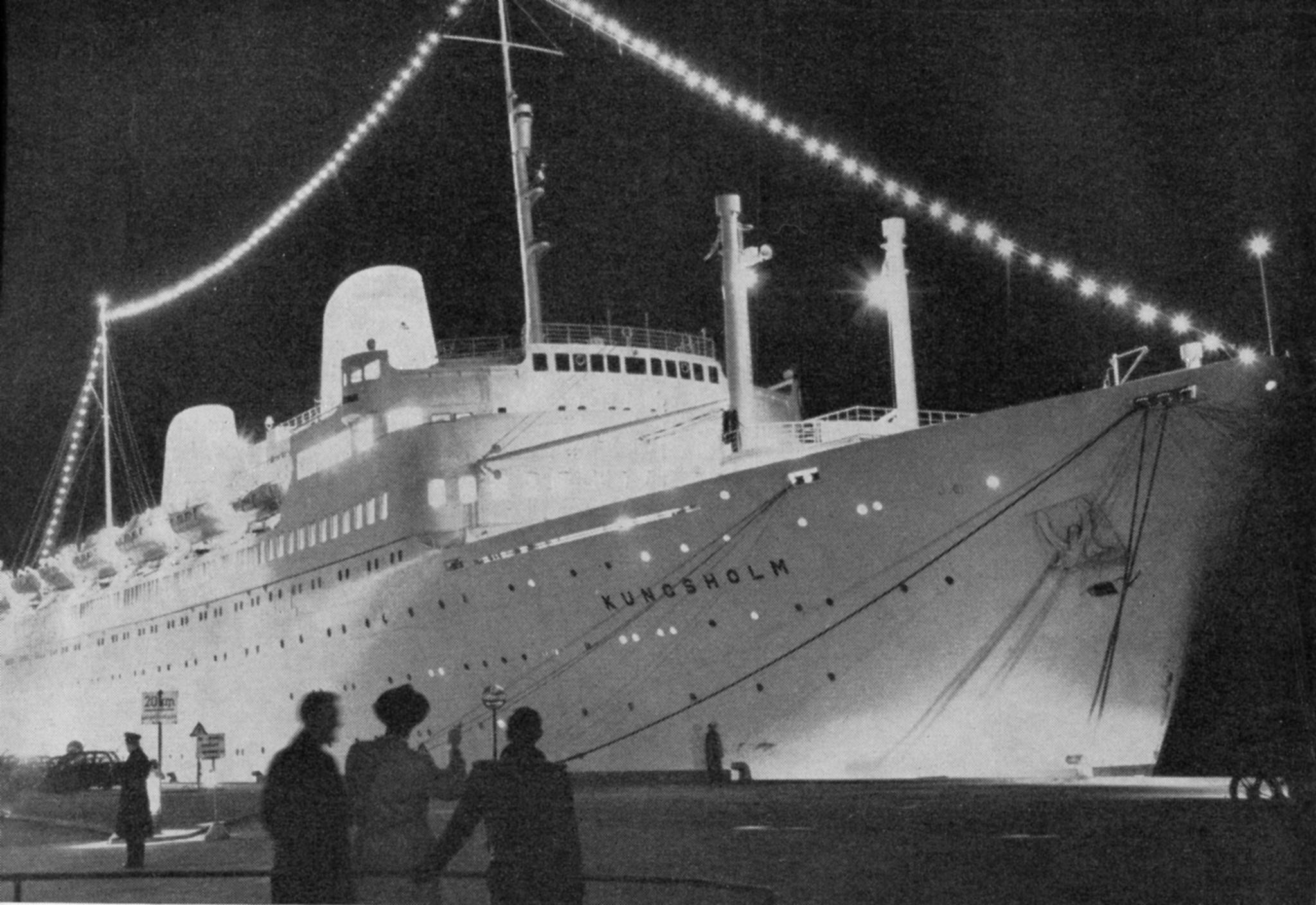
- Kungsholm in 1954

History
- Name: 1953–1965: Kungsholm; 1965–1981: Europa; 1981–1985: Columbus C.
- Owner: 1953–1965: Swedish American Line; 1965–1970: North German Lloyd; 1970–1981: Hapag-Lloyd; 1981–1985:Independent Continental Lines
- Operator: 1953–1965: Swedish American Line; 1965–1970: North German Lloyd; 1970–1981: Hapag-Lloyd Cruises; 1981–1985: Costa Cruises
- Port of registry: 1953–1965: Gothenburg, Sweden; 1965–1981: Bremen, West Germany; 1981–1985: Panama City, Panama
- Ordered: 1 April 1950
- Builder: De Schelde, Vlissingen, The Netherlands
- Yard number: 273
- Launched: 18 October 1952
- Christened: 18 October 1952 by Princess Sibylla of Sweden
- Acquired: 30 September 1953
- Maiden voyage: 24 November 1953
- In service: 24 November 1953
- Identification: IMO number: 5197664
- Fate: Partially sunk at Cádiz, Spain, 29 July 1984. Scrapped in 1985.

General characteristics (as Kungsholm)
- Type: combined ocean liner / cruise ship
- Tonnage: 21,164 GRT; 4,153 tonnes deadweight (DWT)
- Length: 182.89 m (600 ft)
- Beam: 23.50 m (77 ft 1 in)
- Height: 60 m (196 ft 10 in) from keel to mast top
- Draught: 13.85 m (45 ft 5 in)
- Decks: 9 (6 passenger accessible)
- Installed power: 2 × 8-cylinder Burmeister & Wain diesels; combined 13503 kW
- Propulsion: 2 propellers
- Speed: 21 kn (38.89 km/h) service speed
- Capacity: 802 passengers (176 first class, 626 tourist class)
- Crew: 418

General characteristics (as Europa)
- Type: combined ocean liner / cruise ship
- Capacity: 843 passengers (122 first class, 721 tourist class)

MS Kungsholm was a combined ocean liner / cruise ship built in 1953 by the De Schelde shipyard in Vlissingen, the Netherlands for the Swedish American Line. Between 1965 and 1981 she sailed for the North German Lloyd and their successor Hapag-Lloyd as MS Europa. From 1981 until 1984 she sailed for Costa Cruises as MS Columbus C. She sank in the port of Cádiz, Spain after ramming a breakwater on 29 July 1984. The vessel was refloated later that year, but sent to a Barcelona shipbreaker in 1985 for scrapping.

== Concept and construction ==
After the end of World War II the Swedish American Line, the company that had been pioneers of cruising during the 1920s, was left in a difficult situation. MS Stockholm, the large newbuild that had been planned during the late 1930s, never entered service for them because of the war, with the remaining fleet consisting of ageing ships. The company took delivery of their first post-war ship, the fourth MS Stockholm, in 1948. She was a small cargo/passenger liner far removed from the luxury of her pre-war predecessors.

In 1948, during the same year that the Stockholm was delivered, SAL had already begun market research on both sides of the Atlantic, with the prospect of building a new ship in mind. Based on the results of the research, the company decided to order a 20,000 gross register ton combined ocean liner / cruise ship that could accommodate 802 passengers.

The ship was designed by the established Swedish American Line designer, Eric Christiansson, who had designed the three previous Stockholms. He was the technical director at parent company Broström, and would incorporate many design elements, most notably the twin stack profile, from his previous design work on the MS Stockholm II (1938) and MS Stockholm III (1941). After contacting 50 shipyards around the world about the prospects of buildings their new ship, SAL placed an order for their new ship with the De Schelde shipyard in The Netherlands on 1 April 1950.

On 18 October 1952 the new ship was launched and christened MS Kungsholm by Princess Sibylla of Sweden. The name "Kungsholm" was a traditional one, having been the name of two previous SAL ships. The newest Kungsholm was delivered to her owners on 30 September 1953.

== Service history ==
=== As Kungsholm ===
The brand new Kungsholm set on her maiden voyage from Gothenburg to New York City on 24 November 1953. During her time with the Swedish American Line she was used on transatlantic crossings during the Northern Hemisphere summer season, and on luxury cruises during the rest of the year. She was a highly successful vessel, and already in September 1954 SAL decided to order a slightly larger ship (eventually named MS Gripsholm) based on the same design from the Ansaldo shipyard in Genoa, Italy to become a running mate for the Kungsholm.

In January 1955 the Kungsholm departed on the first-ever around the world cruise made by a SAL vessel. In May 1957 the new Gripsholm was delivered and entered service alongside the Kungsholm. In 1961 the Kungsholm was drydocked and refitted with stabilizers.

Encouraged by the success of the Kungsholm and Gripsholm, the Swedish American Line placed an order for yet another new ship in August 1963. In preparation for the delivery of the new ship—also named MS Kungsholm—the old Kungsholm was sold to the North German Lloyd in May 1964, with the delivery date set in October 1965. She set on her last transatlantic crossing in SAL colours from New York on 21 August 1965, arriving in Gothenburg on 5 October 1965. Ten days later she was delivered to the North German Lloyd.

=== As Europa ===
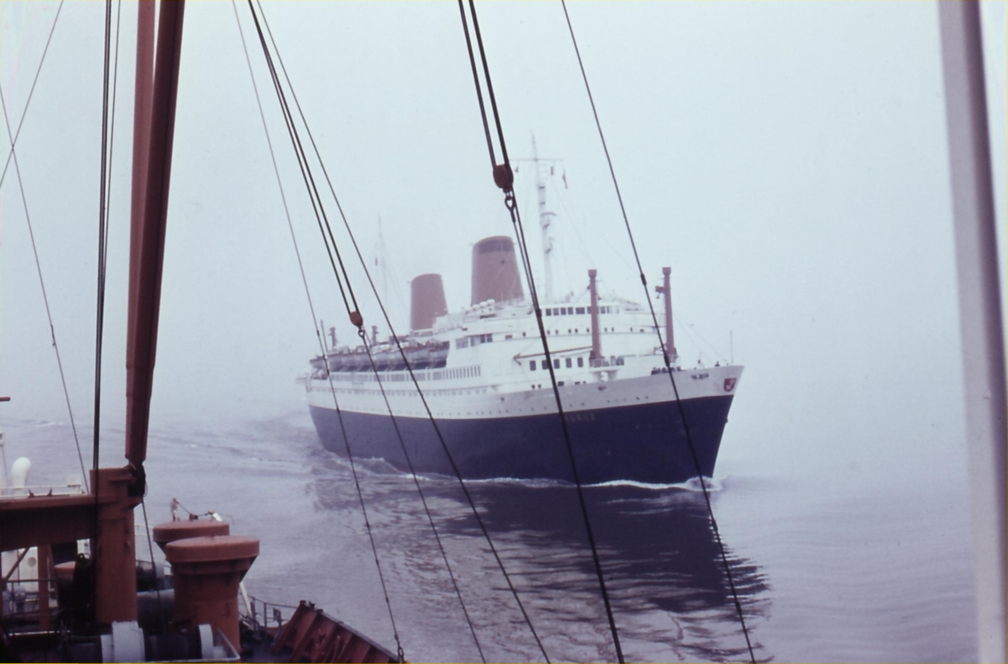
NGL Europa on the Outer Weser (1966)

Following delivery to the North German Lloyd the Kungsholm was renamed Europa (a traditional name in the NGL fleet), given refit and moved under the West German flag. On 9 January 1966 the Europa set on her first transatlantic crossing for her new owners from Bremen to New York. In NGL service the ship followed a similar arrangement as she had with the Swedish American Line, with transatlantic crossings during the (northern hemisphere) summer and cruises during the rest of the year.

Hapag-Lloyd Europa at sea

In September 1970 the North German Lloyd merged with the Hamburg America Line (HAPAG) to form Hapag-Lloyd. Hapag-Lloyd decided to abandon transatlantic service in 1971, and from there on the Europa was used exclusively for cruising. In either 1971 or 1972 she was re-painted in the new Hapag-Lloyd livery.

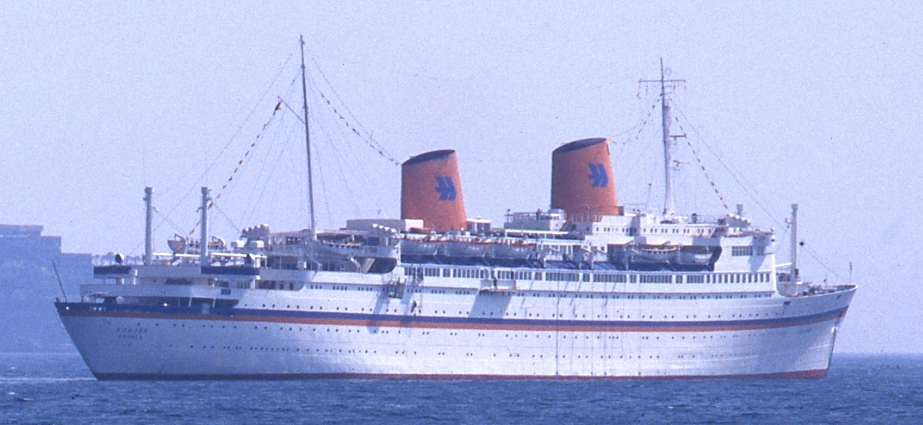
Hapag-Lloyd Europa at Taormina, Italy

As the 1970s were drawing to a close, Hapag-Lloyd started planning a new ship to replace the Europa, also to be named MS Europa. With the delivery date of the new Europa set in December 1981, the old Europa was sold to Independent Continental Lines, a subsidiary of Costa Cruises, with a delivery date in November 1981.

=== As Columbus C. ===
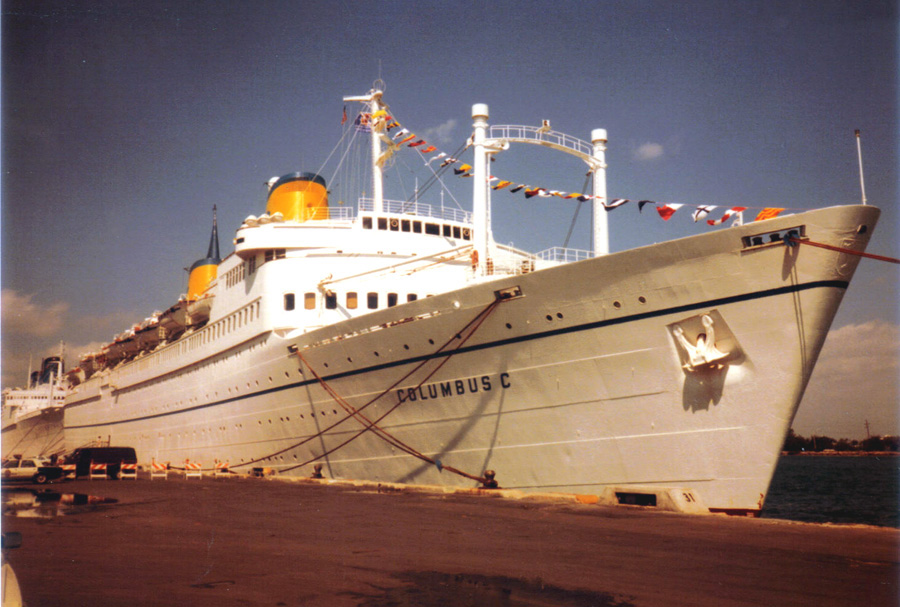
Costa Cruises Columbus C In Miami (1984)

Following the sale to Independent Continental Lines, the Europa was renamed Columbus C., painted in Costa Cruises colours and set in cruise traffic. Her career with Costa was short however, as on 29 July 1984 the Columbus C. accidentally rammed a breakwater near Cádiz, Spain. Her keel was badly damaged in the collision, but the ship managed to reach the port of Cádiz under her own power. Her passengers and crew were evacuated, but the ship continued sinking, listing to starboard side. She eventually sank to the bottom of the shallow harbour, remaining only partially submerged.

On 1 November 1984 the Columbus C. was refloated and laid up. The damages were judged to be too severe to be repaired with acceptable costs, and she was sold to Mirak SA in Barcelona to be scrapped. On 2 April 1985 the Columbus C. arrived in Barcelona under tow, where she was scrapped.

== Design ==
=== Exterior design ===
The Kungsholm was designed with a fairly traditional profile. She had a fairly low superstructure compared to her hull, with the forward part of the superstructure rounded and the rear part tiered to accommodate swimming pools. She was equipped with two funnels, the forward one being a dummy.

In her original Swedish American Line livery the Kungsholm's hull and superstructure were painted all-white, with funnels and masts painted yellow, and SAL's blue three crowns logo painted on both funnels. In North German Lloyd service she received the traditional black hull of a transatlantic liner, with the funnels and cargo cranes in front of the ship painted buff. Following the merger into Hapag-Lloyd, her hull was repainted white with orange and blue decorative ribands, and the blue Hapag-Lloyd logo was added to her now orange funnels. In Costa Cruises service the two ribands on the hull were replaced with a thinner black one, while the funnels were painted yellow with a blue top and the large blue "C" logo of Costa painted on both of them.

=== Decks ===
As built the Kungsholm had nine decks, six of which were passenger accessible.
