= John W. Anderson (sailor) =

Commodore John William Anderson (February 14, 1899 – February 15, 1976) was the longest serving captain of the SS United States, the fastest ocean liner in history. In 1952, he relieved Commodore Harry Manning as master of the superliner after the recordbreaking voyage on which she broke the translantic speed record previously held by the RMS Queen Mary and captured the Blue Riband for the United States.

== Early life and career ==
Anderson was born in 1899 in Jersey City, New Jersey, to parents of Norwegian and English descent. His grandfather spent twenty-five years at sea in Norwegian sailing ships. He entered the New York Nautical School (which later became the SUNY Maritime College) in 1915, and served as a cadet aboard the schoolship Newport, formerly a gunboat in the Spanish–American War. After graduation he went to sea as a quartermaster and junior officer on several famous old liners like the SS Manchuria and SS New York. He later sailed to Australia, India and China on freight ships and tankers as chief mate and obtained his first command in 1921. In 1934 he was appointed to command the American Importer, his first passenger ship for United States Lines, sailing between New York City, Plymouth, Cherbourg, Le Havre, Hamburg and Liverpool. One notable voyage took place in 1935, when he transported Colonel and Mrs. Charles A. Lindbergh and their son Jon to Liverpool after the kidnapping of their younger child.

== World War II ==
Following the outbreak of World War II, the Swedish motor liner Kungsholm was seized at New York City, placed under the American flag and purchased by the U.S. government. The United States Lines were appointed agents by the War Shipping Administration to run the ship as a troop transport and Anderson was selected to command her. The ship, renamed USAT John Ericsson, left New York at the end of January 1942 in convoy with a full complement of 6,000 U.S. soldiers for Australia and Noumea. Their ultimate mission was to garrison the island of New Caledonia. Returning to the Atlantic, the John Ericsson resumed her mission and by the close of the war had safely transported some 300,000 troops to various theaters of war, despite frequent attacks by enemy submarines and aircraft.

In 1940 Anderson took command of the SS Washington, the second largest U.S. passenger liner of the time, and in 1949 he was named master of the 34,000-ton luxury liner America, then the nation's largest and finest passenger liner. While in command of the America, Anderson gained a reputation for outstanding seamanship, unfailing good nature and insistence on crew discipline and courteous service that helped dispel the myth that American passenger ships were inferior to European liners.

== Postwar years ==
At the end of World War II, the nation's leading naval architect, William Francis Gibbs, was asked to design a supership of great size and speed that would not only be the finest luxury liner afloat, but would also be capable of carrying a full division of troops in wartime. The result was the 53,000-ton superliner United States, built in close cooperation with the Maritime Administration and the U.S. Navy. In September 1952, following the voyage on which she broke the speed record previously held by the Queen Mary, crossing the Atlantic in just three days, ten hours and forty minutes at an average speed of nearly 36 knots, Anderson took over command of the United States from Harry Manning and one year later he was appointed commodore of the entire United States Lines' fleet of 55 passenger and cargo vessels.

== Career highlights ==
In 1956 the United States began to experience labor problems that would eventually lead to her layup. One of the most serious came in February 1957. A tugboat strike had been in progress for a week and when the ship arrived in New York the port was at a standstill and there were no tugs to help her dock. Described by The New York Times as "the loneliest merchant mariner in the port" that day, Commodore Anderson successfully docked the huge 990-foot, $78 million liner without tug assistance and without mishap, a navigational feat he would have to perform again on several occasions, including the final voyage before his retirement.

== Legacy ==
Commodore John Anderson ended his career in 1964, having served as master of the United States for 12 years. During his long career he received many honors. In 1957 he was presented with the Merchant Marine Achievement Award by the American Legion, and in 1958 he was cited by the Council of American Master Mariners for outstanding maritime achievement. Anderson died on February 15, 1976, and his uniform and other SS United States memorabilia are on display at the Maritime Industry Museum at Fort Schuyler.

== Sources ==
- Frank O. Braynard, The Big Ship. The Mariners' Museum, Newport News, Virginia. The New York Times, "Dean of U.S. Skippers Retires by Bringing in Liner Unaided" February 20, 1964
- Look Magazine, "The Commodore Leaves the Sea" April 21, 1964 (p. 38) The Saturday Evening Post, "Queen of the Seas" September 14, 1957 (p. 48)
