= Swedish American Line =

Defunct Swedish cargo and passenger shipping company (1915-84)

- House flag

- Industry: Cargo and passenger shipping
- Founded: 1915
- Defunct: 1984 (former SAL)
- Successor: Rederi Swedish American Line AB
- Headquarters: Gothenburg, Sweden
- Key people: Dan Broström
- Parent: Broström Group
- Subsidiaries: South Atlantic Lines, Home Lines, Hoverlloyd, Swedish Atlantic Line, Atlantic Container Line

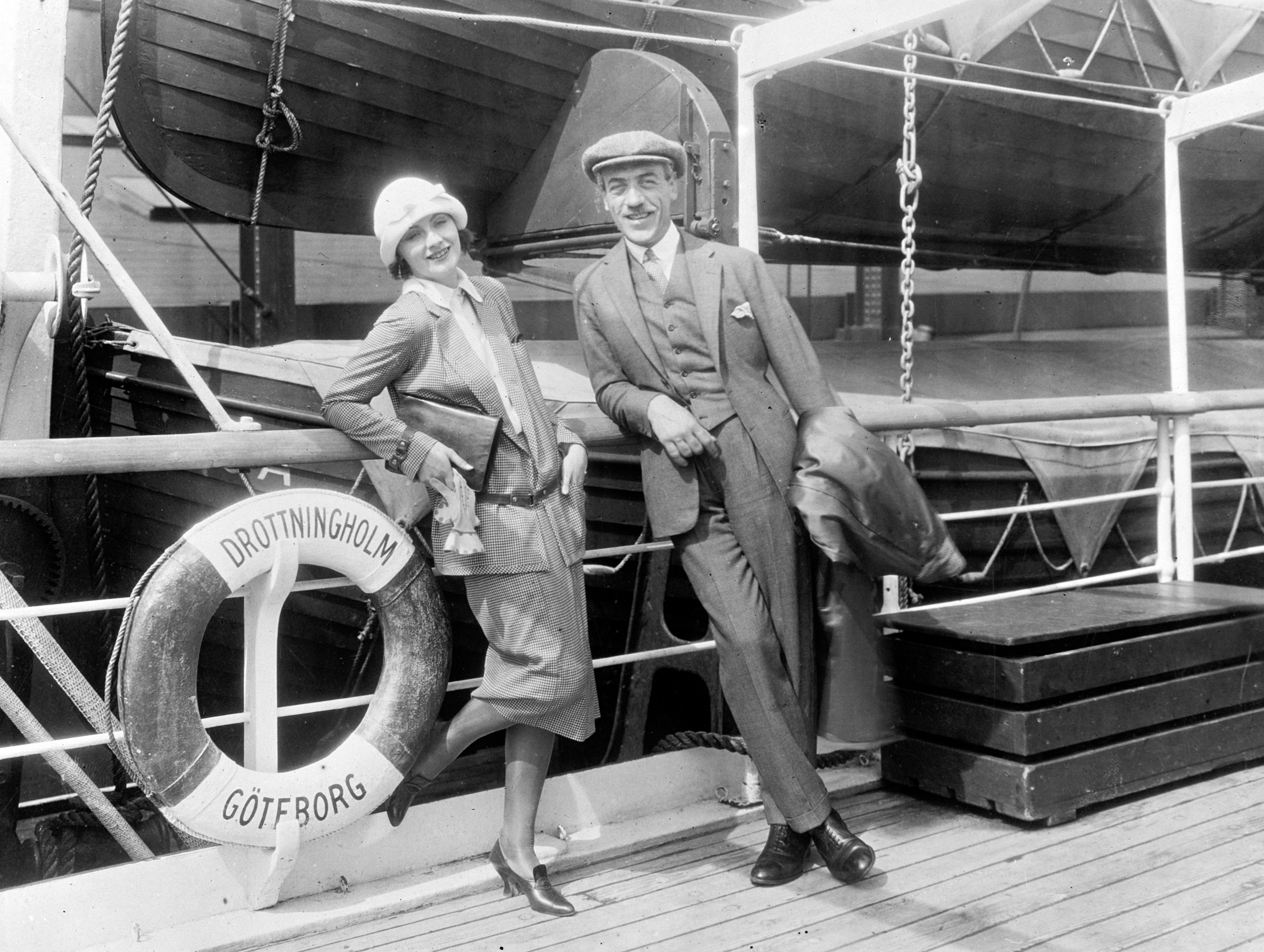
Greta Garbo and Mauritz Stiller on board the SS Drottningholm in 1925, en route to the United States.

Swedish American Line (Swedish: Svenska Amerika Linien, abbr. SAL) was a Swedish passenger shipping line. It was founded in December 1914 under the name Rederiaktiebolaget Sverige-Nordamerika and began ocean liner service from Gothenburg to New York in 1915. In 1925 the company changed its name to Svenska Amerika Linien / Swedish American Line.

The Swedish American Line was among the first companies to build liners with provisions for off-season cruising, as well as the world's first company to build a diesel-engined transatlantic liner. Increased operational costs and stronger competition from passenger aircraft forced the company to abandon passenger traffic in 1975, but cargo operations continued until the 1980s.

== History ==
=== 1915–1924 ===
Rederiaktiebolaget Sverige-Nordamerika (literally, "shipping corporation Sweden-North America") was born from the idea of Wilhelm R. Lundgren, the owner of Rederiaktiebolaget Transatlantic, with the purpose of offering ocean liner service from Sweden to North America. Both Norway and Denmark already operated their own transatlantic liners, and the establishing of a Swedish company for the trade was a matter of national pride. Lundgren died in September 1914, but his successor Gunnar Carlsson managed to attract the attention of Dan Broström of the Broström Concern, and on 4 December 1914 the new Rederiaktiebolaget Sverige-Nordamerika was founded in Gothenburg. The Broström Concern had already operated freighters across the North Atlantic since 1911 under the name of Swedish American Mexico Line (often abbreviated SAML). Originally the new company had planned to commission two purpose-built 18000-ton ships, but this plan was never realised. Instead, in September 1915 the company acquired the 1900-built Holland America Line vessel SS Potsdam, which was renamed SS Stockholm. On 11 December 1915, in the midst of World War I, the Stockholm left on her first crossing from Gothenburg to New York. En route she was stopped by a British naval vessel and forced to make a stop at Kirkwall, where all mail onboard was confiscated. In the end, the Stockholm's first transatlantic crossing took no less than 15½ days. Initially the new company concentrated on immigrant trade, with substantial provision made for passengers traveling in steerage. Despite the difficulties caused by the war, the Stockholm continued transatlantic services until 1917, when Germany's unrestricted submarine warfare forced her to be laid up in Gothenburg until June 1918, when she resumed service.

In February 1920 RAB Sverige-Nordamerika acquired a second ship, the former Allan Line vessel SS Virginian from Canadian Pacific Steamships. The ship had most recently been used as a troopship by the British Admiralty. She was renamed SS Drottningholm and entered service for her new owners on 30 May 1920. In 1922–1923 the Drottningholm was refurbished, re-engined and her superstructure enlarged. As a partial replacement, the 1902-built SS Noordam was chartered from Holland America Line as SS Kungsholm from 27 February 1923 until 18 December 1924. In April 1924 the company acquired SS Borgholm, a small coastal steamer that became the first in a series of feeder ships used to transport passengers from ports around the Baltic Sea to Gothenburg.

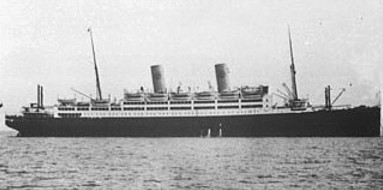
MS Kungsholm of 1928, with her original black hull colour.

=== 1924–1939 ===
In March 1923 RAB Sverige-Nordamerika placed an order for their first newbuilding, the first MS Gripsholm, with Armstrong Whitworth & Co in Newcastle upon Tyne. She was the first diesel-engined liner to be built for the transatlantic service. The Gripsholm was launched and christened on 26 November 1924, and delivered on 7 November 1925. On the same date her owners officially changed their name to Svenska Amerika Linien / Swedish American Line, and on 21 November the Gripsholm set out on her maiden voyage from Gothenburg to New York. Encouraged by the success of the Gripsholm, SAL placed an order for a ship of similar but larger design with the Blohm & Voss shipyard in Hamburg on 28 October 1926. In 1927 the company decided to enter the cruise market, offering various cruises during the Northern Hemisphere winter season.

On 17 March 1928 the new MS Kungsholm was launched at Blohm & Voss. The Kungsholm's interiors were designed with off-season cruising in mind, with her passenger capacity shrunk from 1344 on liner service to around 600 for cruising. She was also one of the first liners with interior decorations in art deco style, following the lead of the SS Ile de France, built in 1927. The ship was delivered to SAL on 13 October 1928, and left on her maiden voyage on 24 November 1928. Coinciding with the delivery of the new ship, the first SS Stockholm was sold to Norwegian interests for conversion to a whale factory ship, SS Solglimt. With the Gripsholm and Kungsholm the SAL gained popularity with West European and American passengers, both in liner and cruise service. In May 1929 the United States and Canada imposed extensive restrictions on immigration. At some point after the delivery of the Kungsholm, SAL decided to abandon the traditional black hull colour and their entire fleet was repainted with white hulls.

The Swedish American Line continued operations with the Drottningholm, Gripsholm and Kungsholm throughout the 1930s. In November 1936 the company placed an order for a new ship, MS Stockholm, with Cantieri Riuniti dell'Adriatico, Monfalcone, Italy. The planned delivery date for the ship was in March 1939, but she was destroyed by a fire during the final stages of construction on 19 December 1938. Construction of a second ship based on the same design, also named MS Stockholm, began soon after the destruction of the original.

=== 1939–1946 ===
Due to World War II breaking out in Europe, the Kungsholm made her last transatlantic crossing in October 1939, after which she was used for cruising around the West Indies until 1941. Also due to the war the Gripsholm and Drottningholm were taken out of service and are laid up on 24 November 1939 and March 1940, respectively. Meanwhile, the construction work continued on the third Stockholm in Italy, and she was launched on 10 March 1940. In October 1941 the ship was ready for delivery, but due to the war SAL had no service to place her on. As a result, the ship was sold to the Italian government on 3 November 1941 and converted to the troopship MS Sabaudia. The Sabaudia eventually sunk outside Trieste on 6 July 1944. Had the Stockholm ever entered service for SAL, she would have been the largest ship ever operated by the company.

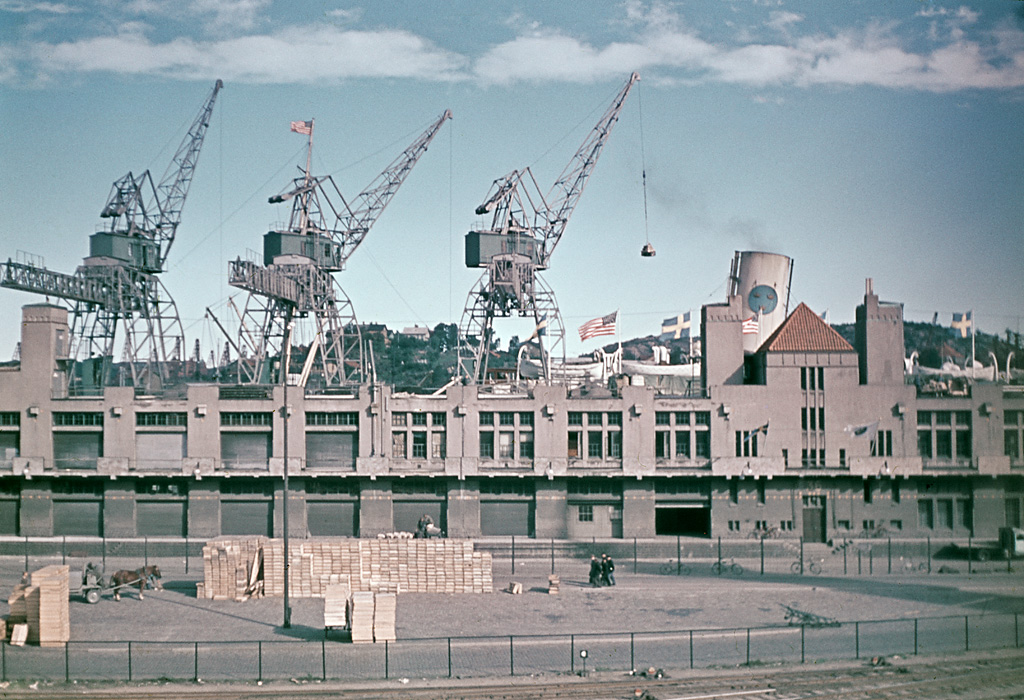
Stigbergskajen quay in Gothenburg where the steamers of the Swedish American Line moored, and the port terminal "The American Shed". Shown in 1944.

In December 1941 the US Government confiscated the Kungsholm while she was in New York. After negotiations with the Swedish American Line, the company agreed to sell the ship to the War Shipping Administration (WSA) for $6 million which renamed the ship John Ericsson for operation under WSA contract by United States Lines with allocation first to the State Department and then in January 1942 to Army troop transportation until 1945 when she was laid up. The Drottningholm meanwhile was chartered by the US government 4 March 1942 for use as a repatriation vessel, to exchange official personnel between the United States and the Axis powers. As Sweden was a neutral country during the war, the Swedish-flagged ship could be used to transport passengers between the warring nations, under the command of Sea Captain John Nordlander. The Drottningsholm made two exchange trips for the US government, after which she was chartered for similar use by the British government. In June 1942 the Gripsholm was also chartered to the US government for the same use as the Drottningholm. For this purpose the Gripsholm was managed by the American Export Lines but kept her original Swedish crew and flag. Unlike the Drottningholm, the Gripsholm was chartered to the US government until 1946. Together the Drottningholm and Gripsholm made a total of 33 repatriation voyages during the war.

In October 1944, before the end of World War II, SAL placed an order with the Götaverken shipyard in Gothenburg for a cargo/passenger liner of 12,165 gross register tons (GRT).

=== 1946–1951 ===
In March 1946 the Swedish American Line re-commenced commercial service, with the Drottningholm setting on her first post-war crossing from Gothenburg on 26 March 1946, while the Gripsholm set out on her corresponding crossing from New York on 31 March 1946. On 9 September 1946 the company's newest ship was launched at the Götaverken shipyard and named MS Stockholm. The new Stockholm was the product of an entirely different thinking from her two predecessors with the same name—instead of offering luxurious surroundings, the new ship was to offer cheap transportation for the masses with austere interiors—despite the protests from the company's chief executive and Stateside offices. During the same year the Swedish American Line founded Home Lines together with Cosulich Lines and the Greek businessman Eugen Eugenides. Additionally the operations of Swedish American Mexico Line were merged into those of the Swedish American Line in 1946, bringing five cargo-carrying ships to the fleet of SAL. On 18 July 1947 Swedish American Line bought back the USS John Ericsson from the US Navy, and restored her to her original name. The ship sailed to the Ansaldo shipyard in Genoa, where she was rebuilt for service with Home Lines under the name MS Italia.

On 7 February 1948 the new Stockholm was delivered to SAL. She set out on her maiden voyage from Gothenburg to New York on 21 February 1948. When the Stockholm entered service, the Drottningholm was transferred to South Atlantic Lines (a subsidiary of SAL) and renamed SS Brazil for traffic with Home Lines. Between 18 December 1949 and 14 February 1950 the Gripsholm was rebuilt at Howaldtswerke, Kiel with amongst others new funnels, a new bow and modern navigational equipment. In March 1950 the company placed an order for a new combined cruise ship/ocean liner with De Schelde shipyard at Vlissingen, Netherlands. On 18 January 1951 the Swedish American Line re-commenced cruise service for the first time since 1941, when the Stockholm embarked on a cruise to the West Indies.

=== 1952–1962 ===
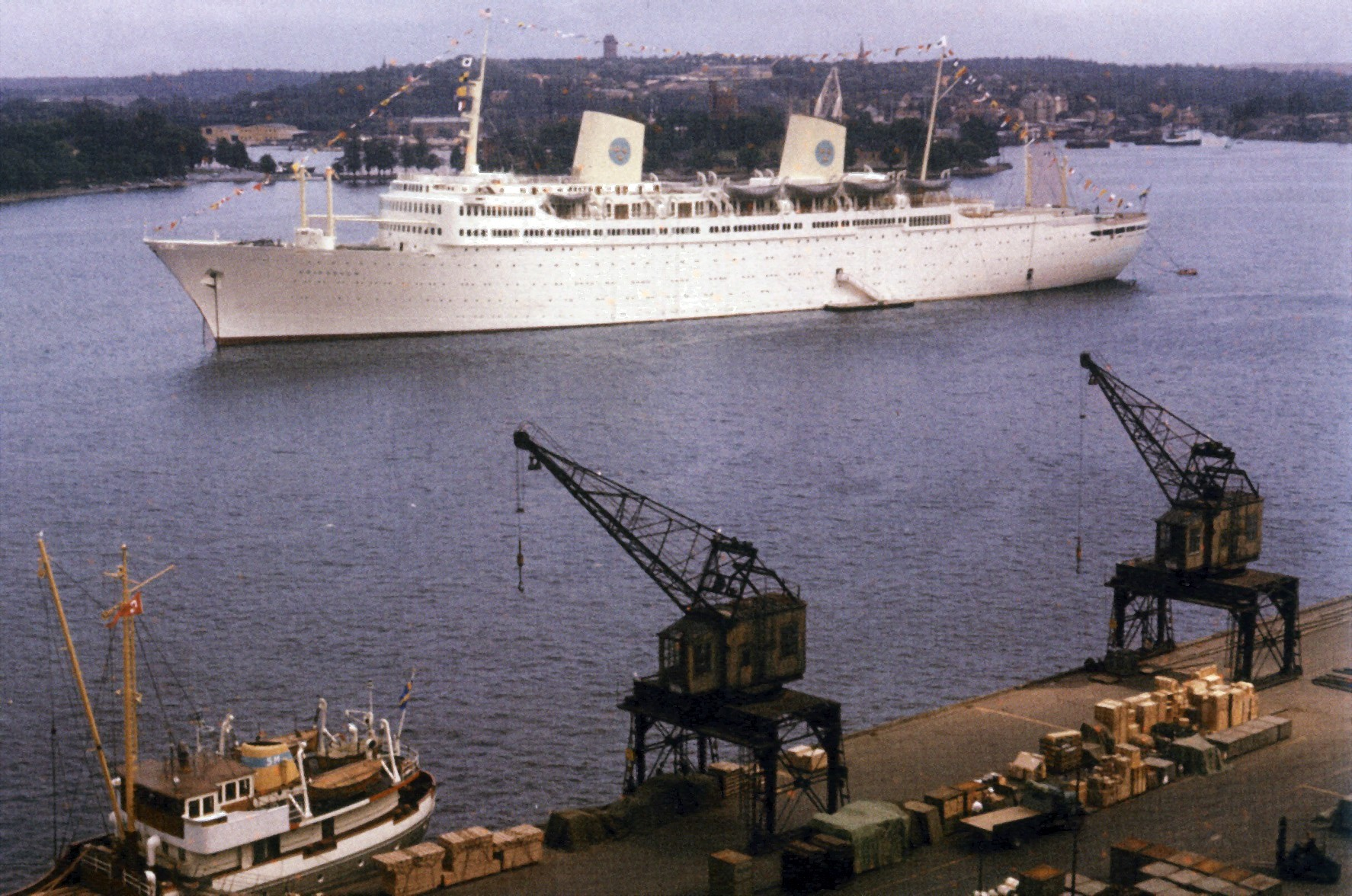
The 1957 Gripsholm in Stockholm, photographed by Gustaf W. Cronquist.

The new ship under construction at De Schelde was launched on 18 October 1952 and named MS Kungsholm, becoming the third SAL ship to bear the name. The new Kungsholm was delivered on 30 September 1953, and set out on her maiden voyage from Gothenburg on 24 November 1953. Following the Kungsholm's delivery the Stockholm was rebuilt with larger passenger accommodations. Coinciding with the completion of the Stockholm's refit, the ageing Gripsholm was sold to the North German Lloyd, becoming their MS Berlin. On 14 September 1954 SAL ordered another new ship, essentially an enlarged version of the most recent Kungsholm, from the Ansaldo shipyard. The new ship was named MS Gripsholm (the second ship to bear that name in the SAL fleet) and launched on 8 April 1956.

On 25 July 1956 the Stockholm collided with the SS Andrea Doria outside Nantucket in one of the most famous maritime disasters of the 20th century. 47 people on the Andrea Doria were lost, while five members of the Stockholm's crew were lost in the collision. Several of the Andrea Doria's passengers were rescued by the Stockholm. She was able to return to New York under her own power, and was subsequently repaired at Bethlehem Steel, returning to service on 5 November 1956. On 14 May 1957 the new Gripsholm started on her maiden voyage from Gothenburg to New York. For the next three years the company operated with three ships. In May 1959 the Stockholm was sold to VEB Deutsche Seereederei, East Germany, with a delivery date on 3 January 1960, becoming their MS Völkerfreundschaft.

=== 1963–1975 ===
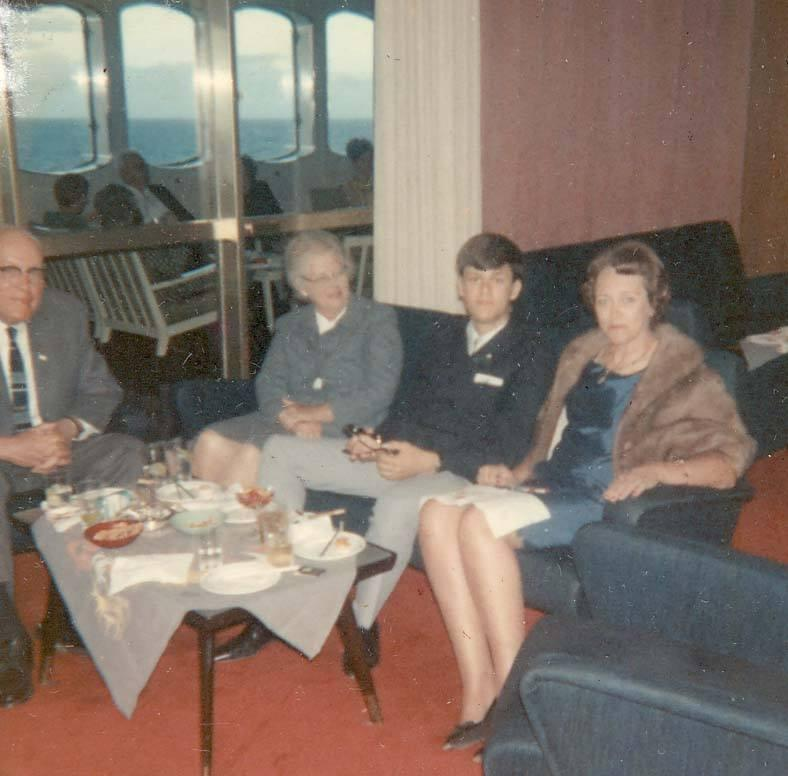
Birgit Ridderstedt (right) and son Lars after his 18th birthday dinner in First Class on the Gripsholm in 1966

On 23 August 1963 the Swedish American Line ordered another new ship, this time from John Brown and Company, Clydebank. The new ship, named MS Kungsholm (the fourth SAL ship with that name), was launched on 14 April 1964. Her design featured several cruise-friendly innovations, including all-outside cabins and large lido decks. In preparation for the delivery of the new Kungsholm, the old (third) Kungsholm was sold to North German Lloyd on 5 October 1965, becoming their third MS Europa. The SAL operated with just one passenger-carrying ship until 24 April 1966, when the fourth (and final) Kungsholm was delivered. She began service with a transatlantic crossing from Gothenburg to New York, after which she was used for cruising around the world. In 1966 SAL's ships made only nine transatlantic crossings. In 1965 SAL had founded Hoverlloyd together with Swedish Lloyd to offer a fast hovercraft connection across the English Channel. Hoverlloyd begun operations in 1966 with two hovercraft, Swift and Sure. Another joint operation was formed in the mid-60s when SAL, Rederiaktiebolaget Transatlantic and Wallenius Rederiet founded Atlantic Container Line as a joint marketing entity for transatlantic freight operations. Some time later the decision was made to establish a new company, Swedish Atlantic Line (AB Svenska Atlant Linjen), for Swedish American Line's freight operations. In the early 70s another joint company, Atlantic Gulf Services, was founded, this time in collaboration with Finnlines.

In 1970 SAL's passenger ships made only three transatlantic crossings, and from 1971 onwards the only crossings made were repositioning cruises. In June 1972 the Swedish American Line purchased the expedition cruise ship MS Lindblad Explorer via their Panama-based subsidiary United Cruising Co. Unlike other SAL passenger vessels, the Lindblad Explorer was registered in Panama, not Sweden. Increased operational costs of Swedish-flagged ships forced the company to start negotiations with Swedish trade unions for re-flagging the Gripsholm and Kungsholm. The negotiations failed however, and 22 March 1975 the company decided to abandon passenger traffic despite protests from the company's United States offices, according to whom the ships would have continued to be highly profitable even under the Swedish flag. The Gripsholm and Kungsholm were taken out-of-service and laid up in August 1975. The Kungsholm was sold to Flagship Cruises in October of the same year for only 65 million Swedish krona, a half of what SAL had paid for her nine years earlier. Flagship maintained her under the name Kungsholm for cruising under Liberian flag. The Gripsholm found a buyer in November when she was sold to Karageorgis Lines, Greece, becoming their MS Navarino. The Lindblad Explorer however stayed under SAL's ownership. At the end of 1975 SAL withdrew from Atlantic Gulf Services.

=== 1975 onwards ===
SAL continued freight operations, maintained their share in Hoverlloyd and ownership of the Lindblad Explorer until the early 1980s. The Lindblad Explorer was sold to Lindblad Swire Cruises in 1980, and soon afterwards SAL withdrew from Hoverlloyd. Apparently the last ship owned by the company was sold in 1986. In 1984 the company was bought by competing ship owner Rederi AB Transatlantic, which in turn was bought by transportation company Bilspedition AB in 1988. The last vestiges of SAL disappeared in 1990, when Bilspedition closed down its shipping department.

As of 2026, the last surviving ships that were part of Swedish American Line are: the tender SS Marieholm, serving as restaurant ship in Gothenburg, Sweden; and a tender from the MS Kungsholm, used as the excursion boat Cygnet on Coniston Water, England.

== Ships ==
Lists sourced from.

=== Passenger ships ===
Ship	Image	Built	In service for SAL	Tonnage	Ship yard	Status	Notes
SS Stockholm		1900	1915–1928	12,835 GRT	Blohm + Voss, Germany	Sunk 1942	
SS Drottningholm		1905	1920–1946	11,285 GRT	Alexander Stephen and Sons, Scotland	Scrapped 1955.	
SS Kungsholm		1902	1923–1924	12,500 GRT	Harland & Wolff, Ireland	Scrapped 1928	
MS Borgholm		1899	1924–1934	518 GRT		Scrapped 1953	Used on feeder service from the Baltic Sea to Gothenburg. Scrapped 1953.
MS Gripsholm (1925)		1925	1925–1954	17,944 GRT; 19,105 GRT	Armstrong Whitworth & Co. Ltd, England	Scrapped 1966	First purpose built passenger ship for Swedish American Line.
MS Kungsholm (1928)		1928	1928–1942	21,250 GRT	Blohm + Voss, Germany	Scrapped 1965	
SS Kastelholm		1929	1929–1952	921 GRT		Scrapped 1965	Used on feeder service from the Baltic Sea to Gothenburg.
SS Marieholm		1934	1934–1940	1,162 GRT	Odense Staalskibsværft, Denmark	Restaurant Ship	Used on tender service connection from the Baltic Sea ports to Gothenburg. Last surviving ship of the Swedish American Line.
MS Stockholm (1938)		1938	never entered service	30,390 GRT	Cantieri Riuniti dell' Adriatico, Monfalcone, Italy	Destroyed in a fire before delivery in 1938.	Destroyed in a fire before delivery in 1938.
MS Stockholm (1940)		1941	never entered service	30,390 GRT	Cantieri Riuniti dell' Adriatico, Monfalcone, Italy	Bombed and partially sank in 1944, Scrapped	Never sailed for SAL, sold to the Italian government after completed.
MS Stockholm (1948)		1948	1948–1959	12,165 GRT	Götaverken, Gothenburg, Sweden	Undergoing scrapping at Ghent	Collided with SS Andrea Doria in 1956. Had multiple name changes and ended with the name Astoria. Arrived at Ghent for scrapping in 2025.
MS Kungsholm (1952)		1952	1953–1965	21,164 GRT	De Schelde, Vlissingen, Netherlands	Sunk at pier, scrapped 1984	
MS Gripsholm (1957)		1957	1957–1975	23,191 GRT	Ansaldo Shipyard, Italy	Sunk in 2001 on way to scrapyard.	
MS Kungsholm (1965)		1965	1966–1975	26,677 GRT	John Brown & Company, Clydebank, Scotland	Scrapped 2016.	
MS Lindblad Explorer		1969	1972–1980	2,480 GRT	Uudenkaupungin Telakka, Uusikaupunki, Finland	Sunk 2007.	

=== Cargo ships ===
Ship	Built	In service for SAL	Type	Tonnage	Notes
MS Danaholm	1939	1946–1963	freighter	3,643 GRT	Transferred from Swedish American Mexico Line. Scrapped 1972
MS Rydboholm	1946	1946–1963	Kramfors	4,711 GRT	Scrapped 1978
MS Krageholm	1943	1946–1967	Kramfors	3,654 GRT	Sunk 1971
MS Tunaholm	1938	1946–1963	Kramfors	3,851 GRT	Transferred from Swedish American Mexico Line. Scrapped 1972
MS Uddeholm	1945	1946–1963	Kramfors	4,815 GRT	Transferred from Swedish American Mexico Line. Sunk 1977
MS Golden Quest	1945	1946	Kramfors	370 GRT	Sold to Rederiaktiebolaget Jake, Kramfors 1946. Still operating
MS Trolleholm	1946	1946–1962	tanker	4,430 GRT	Transferred from Swedish American Mexico Line. Scrapped 1965
MS Marieholm	1947	1947–1958	tanker	11,966 GRT	Scrapped 1974
MS Maltesholm	1951	1951–1969	Cargo ship	4,694 GRT	Sunk 1981
MS Vibyholm	1951	1951–????	Cargo ship	4,901 GRT	
MS Vasaholm	1955	1955–1971	Cargo ship	4,694 GRT	Sunk 1979
MS Marieholm	1963	1963–1966	Cargo ship	8,488 GRT	Scrapped 1985
MS Sagaholm	1963	1963–1972	Cargo ship	6,916 GRT	
MS Atlantic Saga	1967	1967–1986	Cargo ship	12,231 GRT	Scrapped 1987
MS Mont Royal	1972	1972–1985	Cargo ship	4,262 GRT	Scrapped 2004
