= MS Gripsholm =

MS Gripsholm may refer to one of these passenger ships:

- MS Gripsholm (1924), an ocean liner operated by the Swedish American Line, 1925–1954
- MS Gripsholm (1957), a combined ocean liner/cruise ship operated by the Swedish American Line, 1957–1975
- MS Gripsholm (1965), a cruise ship operated by Transocean Tours 1996–1997
