= SS Marieholm =

Coordinates: 57.7102932°N 11.9614238°E

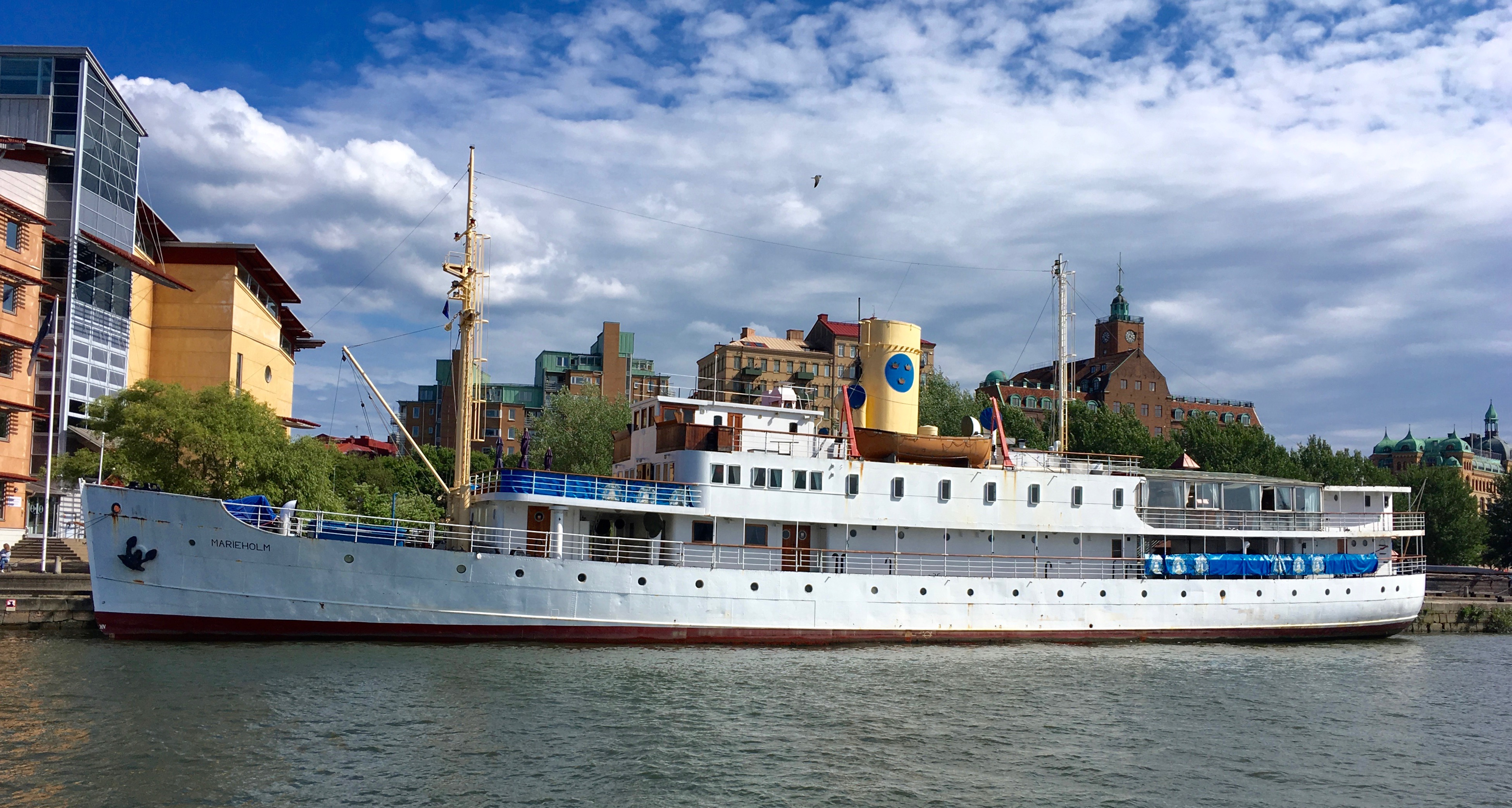
- SS Marieholm on 16 June 2018.

History

Sweden
- Name: SS Marieholm
- Owner: Swedish American line; (1934-1940); Swedish Navy; (1940-1976); Private owner; (1977-1983); S/S Marieholm; (1984-present)
- Builder: Odense Staalskibsværft, Denmark
- Launched: 1934
- Fate: Floating restaurant at Gothenburg, since 1984

General characteristics
- Type: Passenger ship
- Displacement: 1400 tons
- Length: 65 ft (20 m) o/a
- Beam: 9.9 ft (3.0 m)
- Depth: 4.7 ft (1.4 m)
- Propulsion: 1 x machine piston steam engine; 950 ihp (710 kW)
- Speed: 11 kn (20 km/h)
- Complement: 148
- Aviation facilities: Helipad for Helikopter 6

SS Marieholm was a private passenger ship that served in the Swedish Navy and was built by Odense Staalskibsværft. She now serves as a restaurant ship since 1984. She is also the only surviving ship of the Swedish American Line in existence.

== Construction and career ==
Marieholm was laid down by Odense Staalskibsværft at their shipyard at Denmark in the 1930s and launched in 1934. She was owned by Swedish American Line. Marieholm was used for transporting passengers, mainly collection trips from ports in Poland and the Baltic states to Stockholm with passengers for transatlantic roles, which departed from Gothenburg. The number of passengers could amount to 148. From time to time, cruise traffic was also operated within the Baltic Sea area.

The ship was acquired in 1940 by the Swedish Navy and changed its name to HSwMS Marieholm and was used as a cargo ship. Initially, the vessel was used as a radio station in connection with Hårsfjärden radio. From 1950 she served as a staff vessel in the Coastal Fleet. HSwMS Marieholm was taken out of naval service in 1976.

The vessel was sold in 1977 to private stakeholders. She went for three years in ferry role on the lines Sandefjord – Gothenburg and Malmö – Copenhagen. After a few years of decay, Marieholm was refurbished and has been a restaurant ship between the Gothenburg Opera and the Gothenburg Maritime Center in Gothenburg since 1984. SS Marieholm was k-marked (marked as a historical ship in Sweden) in 2010.

== Gallery ==
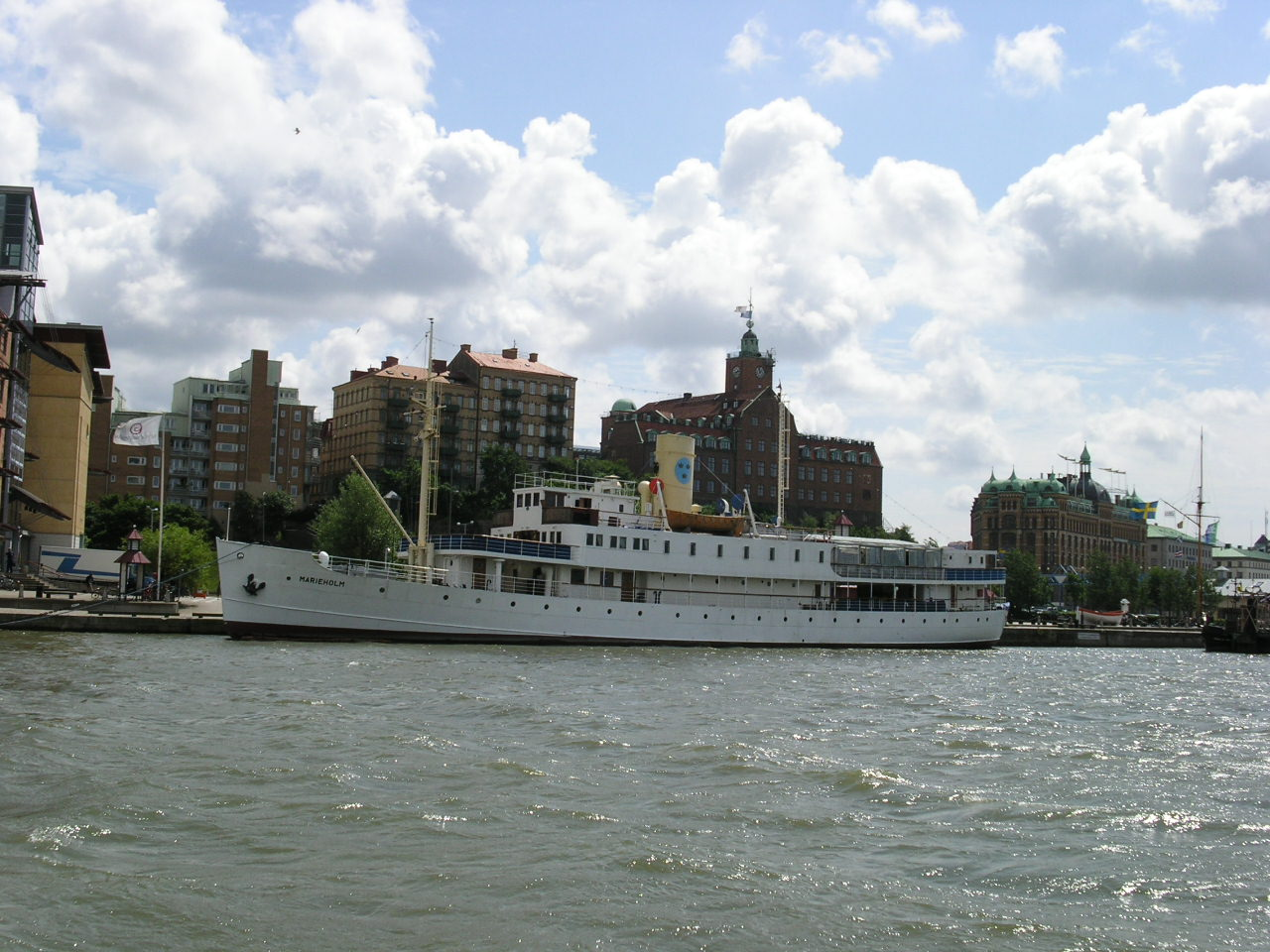
SS Marieholm as a restaurant ship on 12 June 2003.
