= HSwMS Stockholm =

Several ships of the Swedish Navy have been named HSwMS Stockholm, named after the city of Stockholm:

- Stockholm (1682) was a ship launched in 1682
- Stockholm (1708) was a ship launched in 1708 and sold in 1781
- Stockholm (1748) was a galley launched in 1748
- HSwMS Stockholm (1856) was a ship of the line launched in 1856 and decommissioned in 1921
- HSwMS Stockholm (J6) was a Göteborg-class destroyer launched in 1936 and decommissioned in 1964
- HSwMS Stockholm (P11) is a Stockholm-class corvette launched in 1984

== See also ==
- Stockholm (disambiguation), for other ships
