= MS Kungsholm (1928) =

Ocean liner

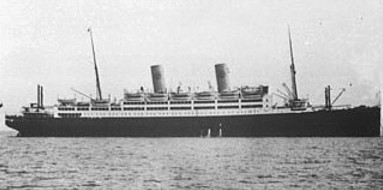
- MS Kungsholm around 1930.

History
- Name: Kungsholm (1928–42); John Ericsson (1942–47); Italia (1948–64); Imperial Bahama (1964–65)
- Owner: Swedish American Line (1928–42); US Government (1942–47); Home Lines (1947–64); Freeport Bahama Enterprises (1964–65)
- Builder: Blohm + Voss, Hamburg
- Launched: 1928
- Completed: November 1928
- Maiden voyage: 24 November 1928
- Identification: code letters KGQH (until 1933); call sign SMJA (1934 onward); IMO number: 5516547
- Fate: Scrapped 1965

General characteristics
- Type: Ocean liner
- Tonnage: 21,250 GRT; 10,379 NRT; 9,490 DWT
- Length: 181.32 m (594 ft 11 in)
- Beam: 22.0 m (72 ft 2 in)
- Draft: 11.52 m (37 ft 10 in)
- Depth: 11.5 m (37.8 ft)
- Installed power: 3,380 NHP
- Propulsion: 2 × 8-cylinder Burmeister & Wain diesel engines, 2 screws
- Speed: 17.5 knots (32.4 km/h)
- Capacity: 1,428 passengers: 209 first class; 395 second class; 940 third class

MS Kungsholm was an ocean liner built in Germany by Blohm & Voss for the Swedish American Line from 1928 to 1941 on transatlantic services from Gothenburg to New York City as well as cruising out of New York. In Second World War the US Government requisitioned it as the troopship John Ericsson.

After the war the Italian Home Lines bought her, renamed her Italia and operated her as a transatlantic liner and cruise ship. In the 1960s she changed hands again to become the hotel ship Imperial Bahama. She was scrapped in Spain in 1965.

== Trans-Atlantic passenger service ==
Kungsholm operated on the transatlantic service with some cruise operations just prior to World War II.

In June 1938, as flagship of the Swedish American Line, she visited Wilmington, Delaware with the Crown Prince Gustaf VI Adolf and Crown Princess Louise of Sweden, members of the Royal Swedish Commission, the Commission of the Republic of Finland and tourists aboard. The visit was in honor of the 300th anniversary of the Swedish landing with the Crown Prince's son Prince Bertil having to do the honors ashore as the Crown Prince was suffering from a kidney attack.

For a brief time 1940–41, as Kungsholm was cruising the Caribbean after war broke out in Europe, the author J. D. Salinger was employed aboard as entertainment director.

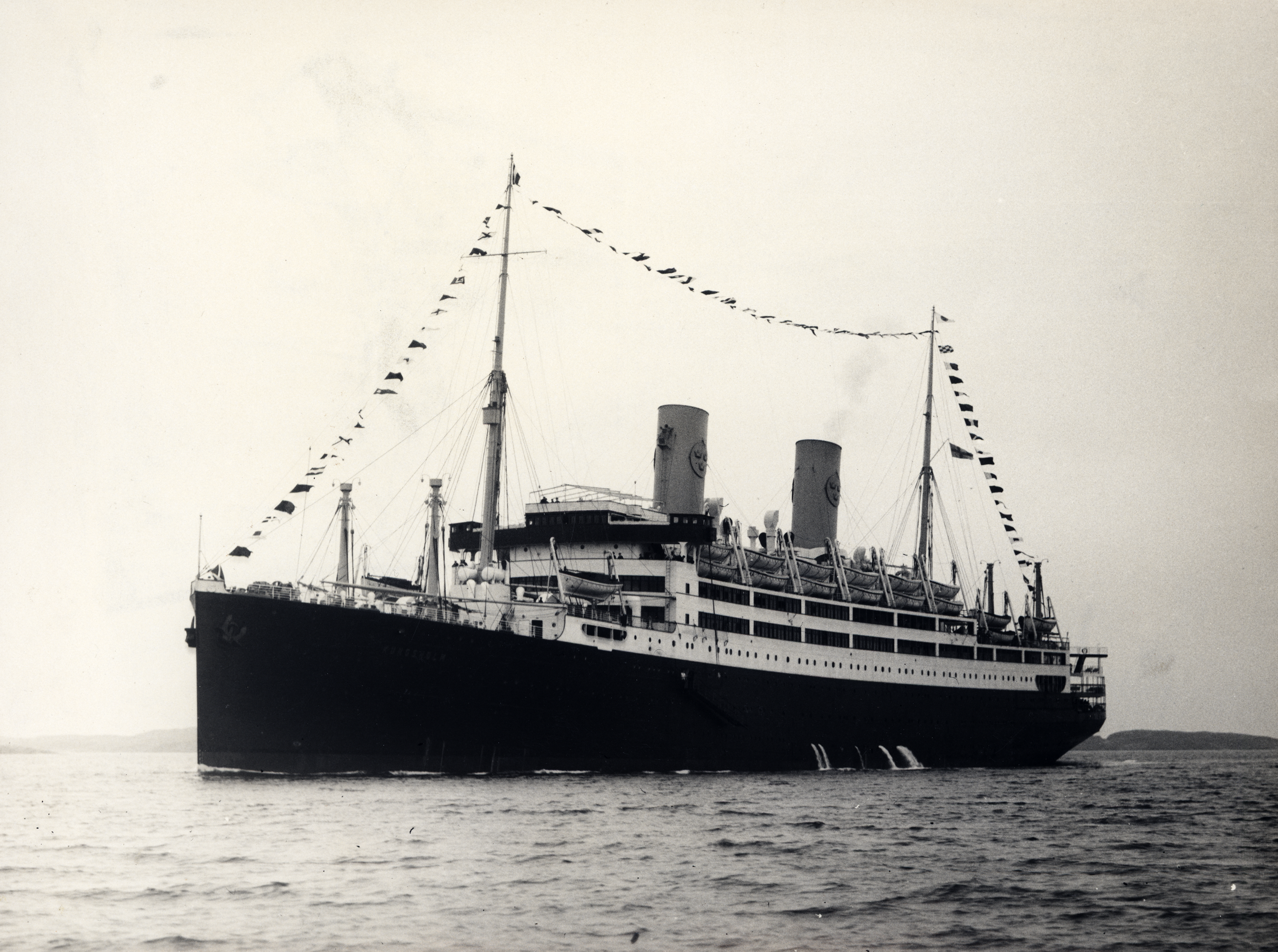
Kungsholm at sea in November 1928

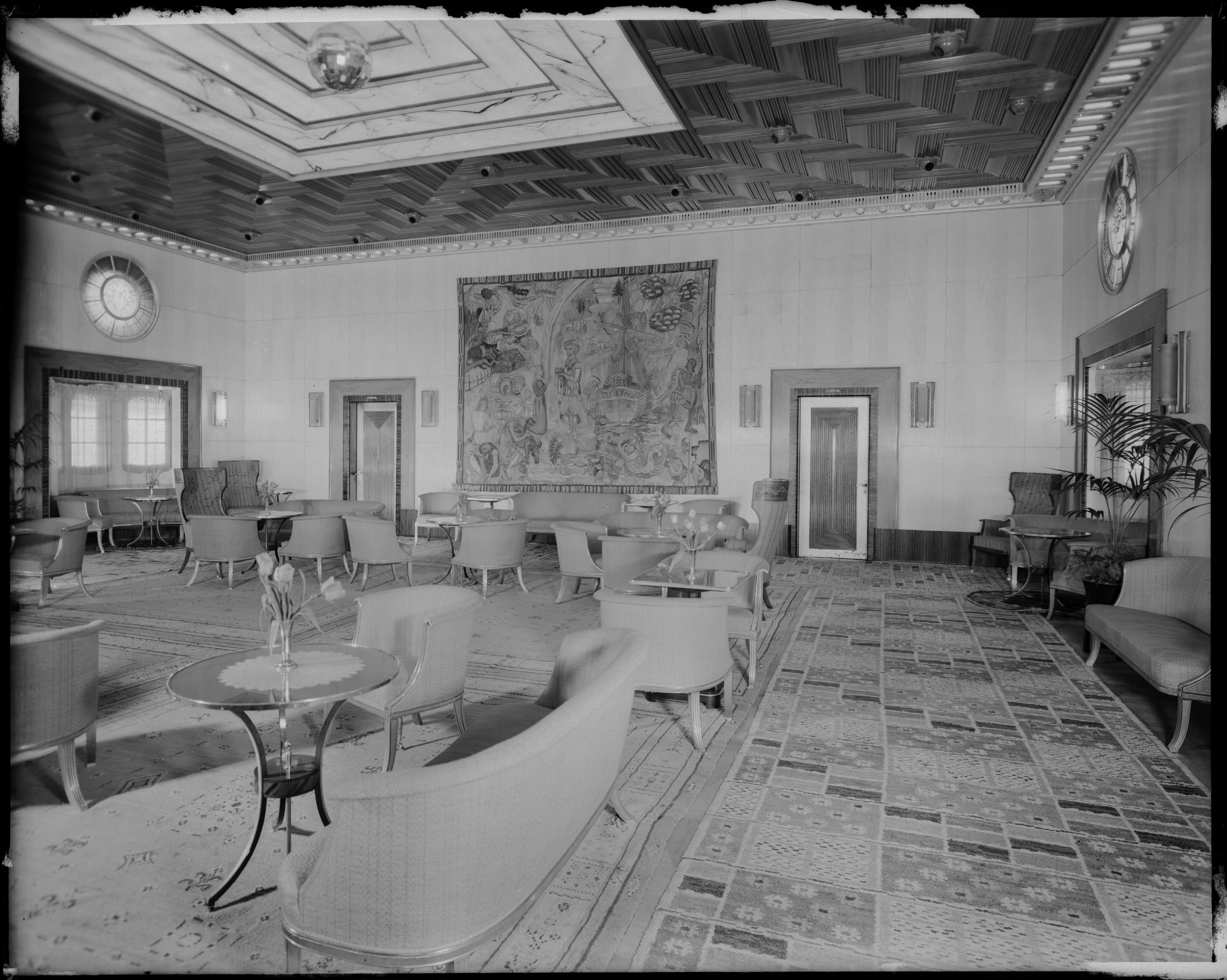
First class musicroom onboard Kungsholm

Kungsholm about 1940

== Wartime service ==
The ship, under the command of Captain John Nordlander, was requisitioned effective 31 December 1941, placed under control of the United States Government's War Shipping Administration (WSA), renamed John Ericsson and delivered for contract operation by United States Lines as a troop transport largely to meet Army requirements.

John Ericsson was one of seven transports hurriedly assembled in New York and sailing late on 22 January 1942 (23 January GMT) in what was then the largest troop movement attempted, movement of POPPY FORCE, also designated Task Force 6814, under General Alexander Patch to secure New Caledonia (codename POPPY) on the vital South Pacific link to Australia. At the time this force was being assembled the ship was allocated to the State Department and with its addition and cutting troops in convoys across the Atlantic the seven ships assembled had a troop capacity of almost 22,000. Task Force 6814 was later organized in New Caledonia as the Americal Division.

John Ericsson was among the group of large, fast troop transports capable of running without escorts, that moved freely among wartime theaters as required. They included the large UK liners, several Allied liners, Navy and Army operated ships, and two sets of sister ships operated for the WSA: Moore-McCormack's Argentina, Brazil and Uruguay, and Matson Lines' Lurline, Mariposa, Matsonia and Monterey.

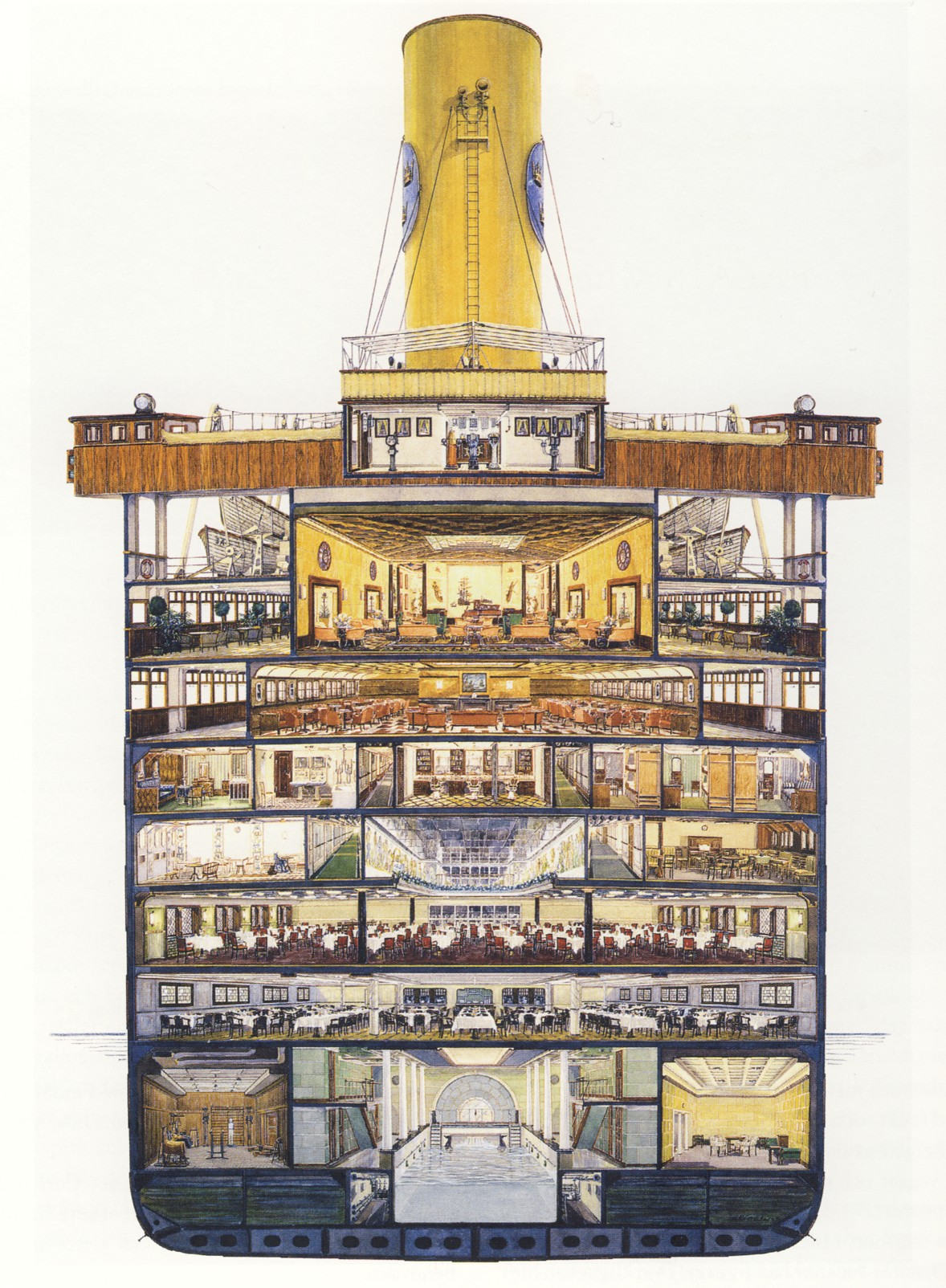
Cross-section

== Postwar service ==
After the end of World War Two the John Ericsson was placed in the Hudson reserve fleet 28 April 1947 with fire damages estimated at between $500,000 and $1,500,000 to repair and offered for sale by bids 5 May on an "as is, where is" basis. The ship was sold back to the Swedish American Line with title passed on 18 July and the ship delivered to Swedish American Line 23 July 1947.

Instead of returning to service with Swedish American Line the ship was sold to Home Lines in 1948 and renamed Italia. With Home Lines the ship served on various routes, including Genoa — South America, Genoa — New York, Hamburg — New York, Hamburg — Quebec, Bremen — Quebec, New York — Nassau as well as cruises from New York to the Caribbean.

In 1964, the ship was sold to the Canaveral International Corporation for use as a 500-room floating hotel in Freeport, Bahamas. The ship was renamed Imperial Bahama, while the hotel complex with a 9-acre golf course, 4 tennis courts, a shopping center and a marina, was known as the Imperial Bahama Hotel. In 1965 the Imperial Bahama was scrapped at Bilbao.

== See also ==
- John W. Anderson
