= MV Argobeam =

Cargo ship built in 1945

History
- Name: Empire Calshot (1945–46); Derrycunihy (1946–52); Argobeam (1952–55); Parkgate (1955–60); Panagos (1960–68)
- Owner: Ministry of War Transport (1945–46); McCowan & Gross Ltd (1946–52); Argobeam Shipping Co Ltd (1952–55); Turnbull, Scott & Co Ltd (1955–60); Compagnia Navigazione Patlem SA (1960–68)
- Operator: H Hogarth & Co Ltd (1945–46); McCowan & Gross Ltd (1946–52); A Lusi Ltd (1952–55); Turnbull, Scott & Co Ltd (1955–60); G Lemos (1960–68)
- Port of registry: (United Kingdom) Burntisland (1945–46); (United Kingdom) London (1946–60); (Lebanon) Beirut (1960–68)
- Builder: Burntisland Shipbuilding Company
- Yard number: 289
- Launched: 10 July 1945
- Completed: November 1945
- Identification: United Kingdom Official Number 180352 (1945–60)
- Fate: Scrapped 1968.

General characteristics
- Tonnage: 7,130 GRT; 4,860 NRT
- Length: 427 ft 1 in (130.18 m)
- Beam: 57 ft 0 in (17.37 m)
- Depth: 35 ft 4 in (10.77 m)
- Installed power: 2SCSA diesel engine
- Propulsion: Screw propeller

Argobeam was a 7,130 GRT cargo ship which was built in 1945 as Empire Calshot for the Ministry of War Transport (MoWT). In 1946 she was sold and renamed Derrycunihy. A further sale in 1952 saw her renamed Argobeam. In August 1955 an engine room fire left her listing 40° to port and she was abandoned. She was salvaged, repaired and sold, being renamed Parkgate. In 1960 she was sold to Panama and renamed Panagos, serving until scrapped in 1968.

== Description ==
The ship was built by Burntisland Shipbuilding Company Ltd, Burntisland, Fife, Scotland, as yard number 289. She was launched on 10 July 1945 and completed in November.

The ship was 427 feet 1 inch (130.18 m) long, with a beam of 57 feet 0 inches (17.37 m) and a depth of 35 feet 4 inches (10.77 m). She had a GRT of 7,130 and a NRT of 4,860. She was propelled by a two-stroke, single cycle single action diesel engine which had three cylinders of 23 5/8 inches (60 cm) diameter by 91 5/16 inches (231.9 cm) stroke.

== History ==
Empire Calshot was built for the MoWT. She was operated under the management of H Hogarth & Sons Ltd. Empire Calshot was allocated the United Kingdom Official Number 180352. Her port of registry was Burntisland. In 1946, she was sold to McCowan & Gross Ltd, London and renamed Derrycunihy, serving until 1952 when she was sold to Argobeam Shipping Co Ltd, London and renamed Argobeam. She was placed under the management of A Luisi Ltd, London.

On 19 August 1955, a fire in her engine room left Argobeam listing 40° to port and the ship was abandoned. She was taken in tow by the tug Salveda on 21 August, involving a rescue mission of Sea Captain John Nordlander, arriving at Stromness, Orkney Islands on 25 August. Following pumping out, she was towed to Copenhagen, Denmark to discharge her cargo and then to Hamburg. During their time on board Salveda the crew of Argobeam smoked a number of duty-free cigarettes, which were being shipped from the United States to Denmark as part of Argobeam's cargo. The unsmoked cigarettes were declared on arrival at Broad Bay, Isle of Lewis, and initially no action was taken. As Salveda was considered to be "British soil" by HM Customs and Excise and not entitled to have duty-free goods on board, officials later demanded the surrender of the unsmoked cigarettes and demanded £7 7s 3d in duty. Captain Watson paid the duty himself, pledging to fight for the return of the money. Argobeam was sold to Turnbull, Scott & Co, London, who had her repaired and renamed Parkgate. In 1960, she was sold to Compagnia Navigazione Patlem SA, Panama and renamed Panagos. She was operated under the management of G Lemos, Greece, flying the Lebanese flag. Panagos was scrapped in 1968 in Shanghai, China.
