= MS Gripsholm (1957) =

Ocean liner of the Swedish American Line

Coordinates: 35°21′S 26°13′E

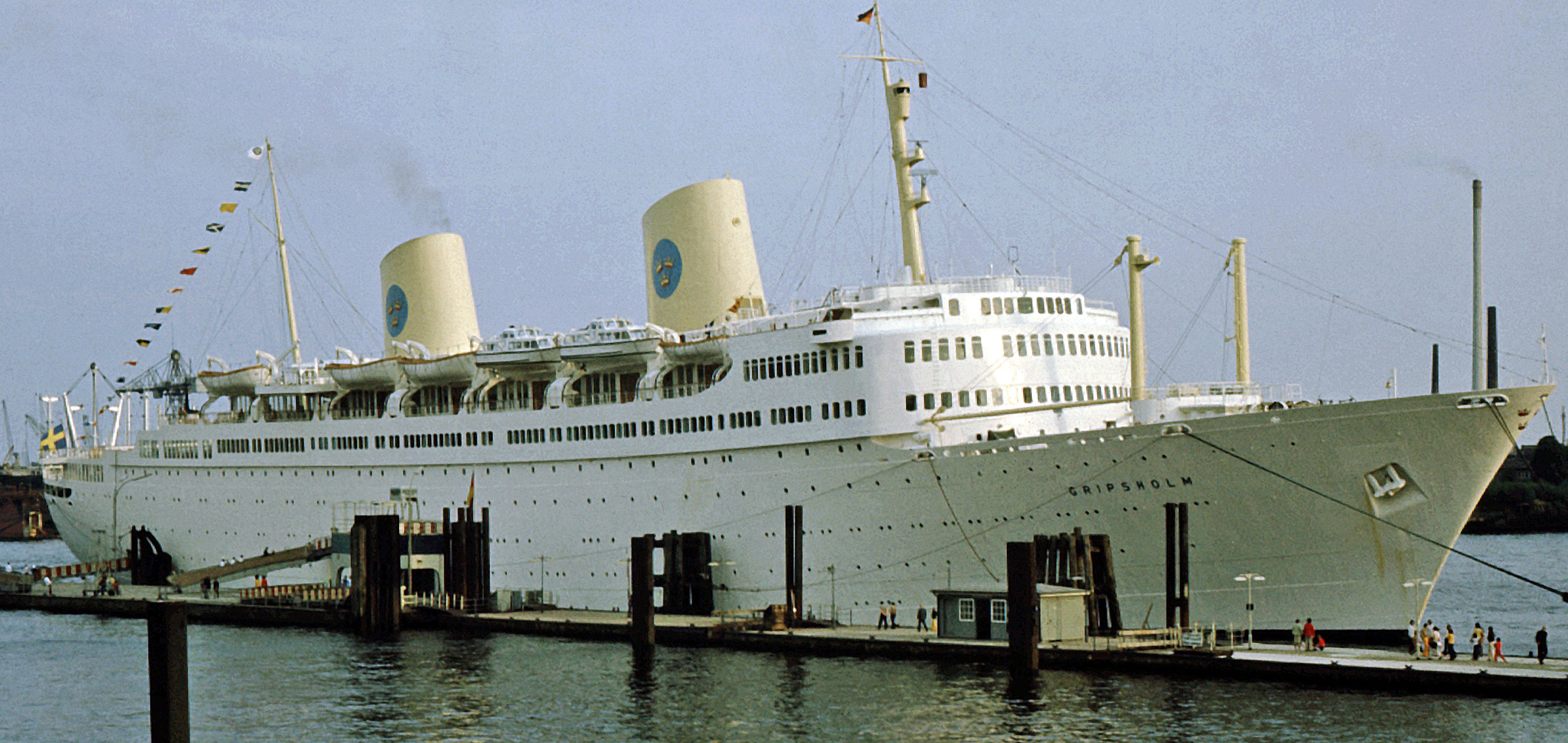
- The Gripsholm in Hamburg, August 1973

History
- Name: MS Gripsholm (1957-1975); MS Navarino (1975-1984); MS Regent Sea (1984-1997); MS Sea (1997-2001)
- Owner: Swedish American Line (1957-1975); Karageorgis Lines (1975-1984); Regency Cruises (1984-1997); United States American Cruise Line (1997-2001)
- Port of registry: 1957–1975: Gothenburg, Sweden; 1975–1981: Piraeus, Greece; 1983–1985: Rome, Italy; 1985–1989: Panama City, Panama; 1989–2001: Nassau, Bahamas
- Route: Gothenburg – New York City
- Builder: Ansaldo Shipyard
- Cost: £7,000,000
- Yard number: 1500
- Launched: 8 April 1956
- Christened: by Princess Margarethe
- Completed: 2 April 1957
- Maiden voyage: 14 May 1957
- In service: 2 April 1957
- Out of service: 1997-2001
- Identification: Call sign: SLQT; IMO number: 5136361; MMSI number: –
- Fate: Sold for scrap in 2001, sank on the way to the scrapyard, 12 July 2001

General characteristics
- Tonnage: 23,150 gt
- Length: 192.41 m (631.3 ft)
- Beam: 24.95 m (81.9 ft)
- Draft: 8.49 m (27.9 ft)
- Decks: 8
- Installed power: 12,085 kW (16,206 hp)
- Propulsion: 2 Gotaverken 9-cyl diesels
- Speed: 18 kn (33 km/h)
- Capacity: 760
- Crew: 365

MS Gripsholm was a combined ocean liner/cruise ship, built in 1957 by Ansaldo Shipyard, Genoa, Italy for the Swedish American Line for use in transatlantic traffic from Gothenburg to New York as well as long-distance cruising.

== History ==
The MS Gripsholm completed her sea trial in January 1957. After the completion of the interior fittings in Gothenburg, she was scheduled to set sail on her maiden voyage May 14. Captain Gunnar Nordenson, master of the Swedish motorship Stockholm when it collided with the SS Andrea Doria, was appointed commander of the Gripsholm. The ship, originally intended as a sister ship to the MS Kungsholm, ended up being a "bigger sister".

After departing on May 14, the Gripsholm arrived in New York on May 23.

In 1971 she was laid up for 3 months in Göteborg, being converted into a pure cruise ship, thus ending her Transatlantic career.

In 1975 she was sold to the Karageorgis Lines, who named her MS Navarino and used her on Mediterranean routes.

On the evening of Friday, August 7, 1981, while sailing a mile south of the Aegean island Patmos, the Navarino ran aground on rocks. After the impact, passengers donning their life-jackets reported to their lifeboat stations. After waiting at their stations for an hour, an announcement over the loud speaker directing anyone who wanted a drink to the ship's lounges. After another hour, a second announcement was made that the ship's insurers, Lloyd's of London, had arrived and that divers were inspecting the damage where the rocks had ripped a hole in the bow. The 497-passengers remained on the disabled ship overnight, according to eye-witnesses everyone stayed on deck, too scared to return to their staterooms.

The following morning, passengers were tendered to the island of Patmos for a barbeque, while Lloyds and the Hellenic Coast Guard continued investigating. The passengers while on the island, became disgruntled as they received no answers or information from the ships leadership. Sunday, August 9, Lloyds relieved the commodore and his three captains of their authority. The MS Mediterranean Sun was pulled from its repair berth in drydock to ferry passengers to Piraeus. The Mediterranean Sun arrived at 02:30 Tuesday morning and were put up in various hotels. Karageorgis offered passengers a partial refund on their cruise, and offered to book the passengers on the Mediterranean Sun back to Venice. Navarino was shopped to Commodore Cruise Lines in September.

The ship was damaged by a fire on 29 October, 1981, and Commodore Cruise Lines insisted on the ship being drydocked and thoroughly inspected before the deal was finalized. While drydocked, the ship tipped over collapsing the wall and flooding the ship, leaving it with a 35-degree list. The prospective sale fell through, and the Navarino stayed in an Athens shipyard until purchased by Regency Cruises.

After some repair difficulties costing $13 Million, in 1984 the vessel became the first ship of the newly formed Regency Cruises, and was named MS Regent Sea. In 1995, Regency went bankrupt, and Regent Sea was auctioned off to United States American Cruise Line, who started on a conversion to a casino ship, but which was never completed due to bankruptcy of the new owner.

In early 2001 the ship was sold for scrap and began a journey under tow to breakers in India. A Swedish plan to turn her into a hotelship in Stockholm ran into resistance from residents, and in the meantime (June) the ship was looted by pirates while at Dakar. On 12 July of the same year, the hulk sank in heavy seas off Algoa Bay in South Africa.

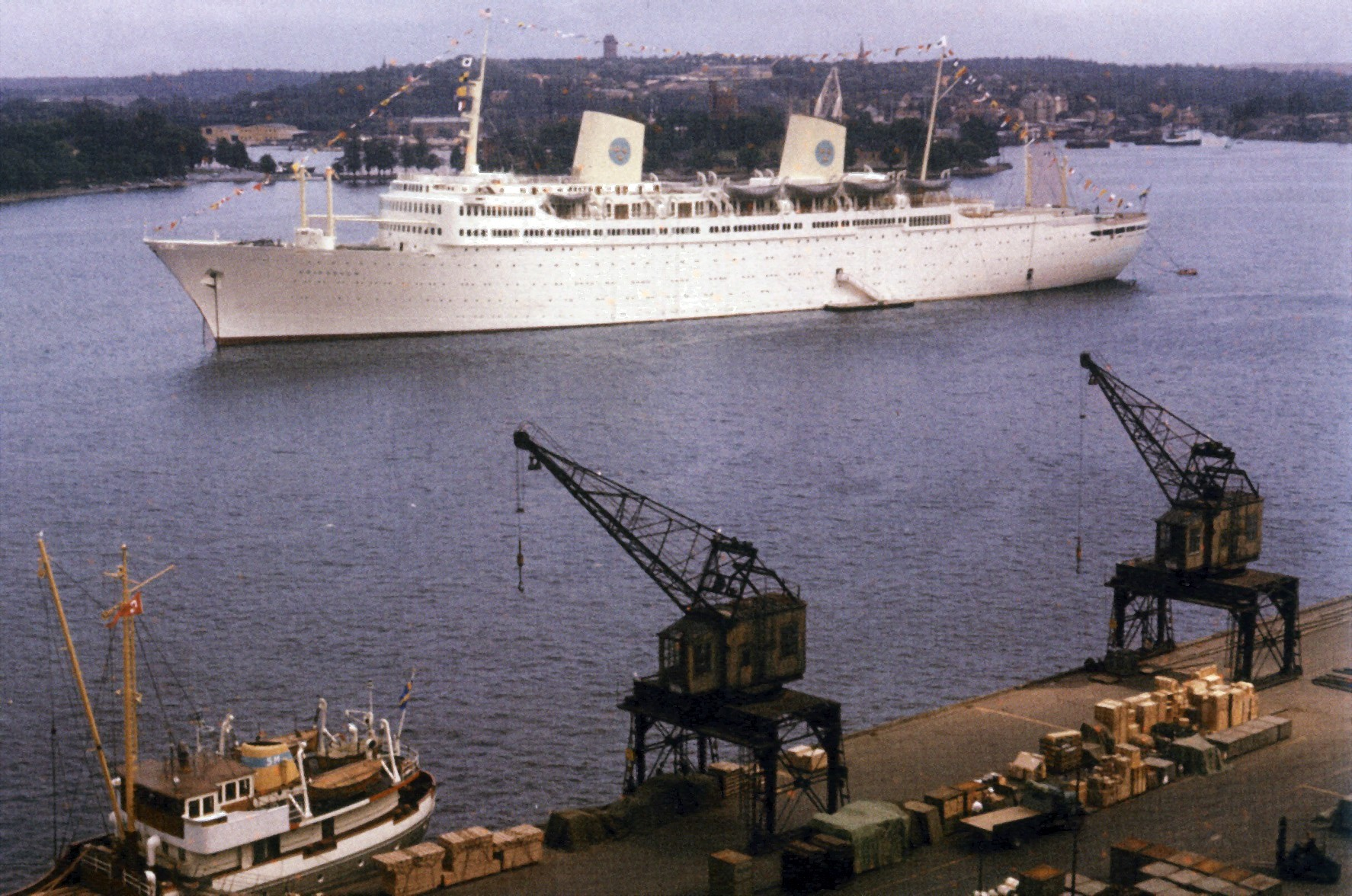
Gripsholm at Stockholm in 1958

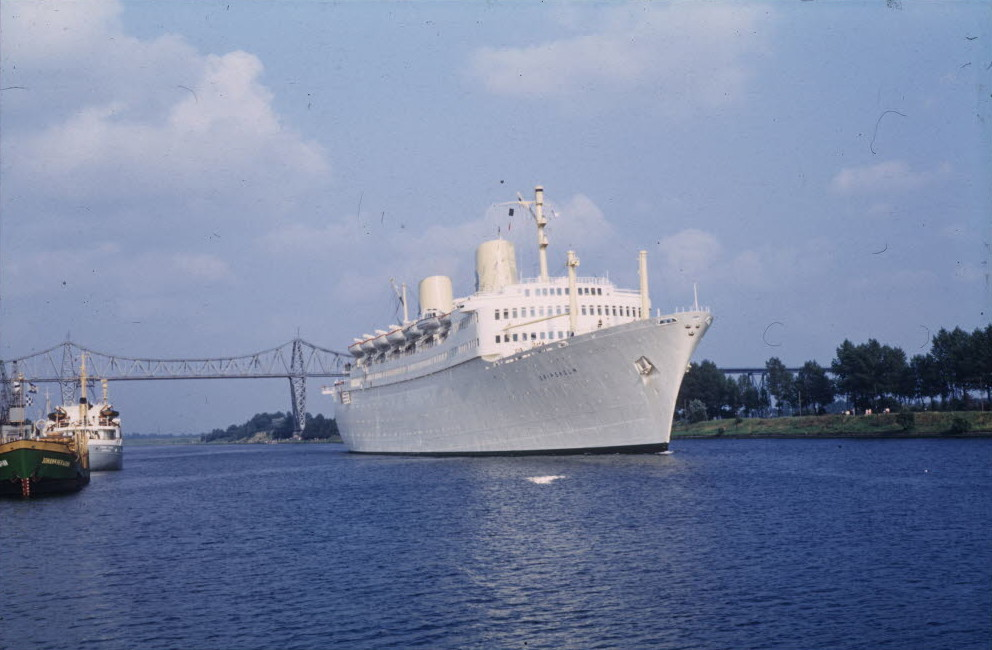
Gripsholm at Kiel Canal

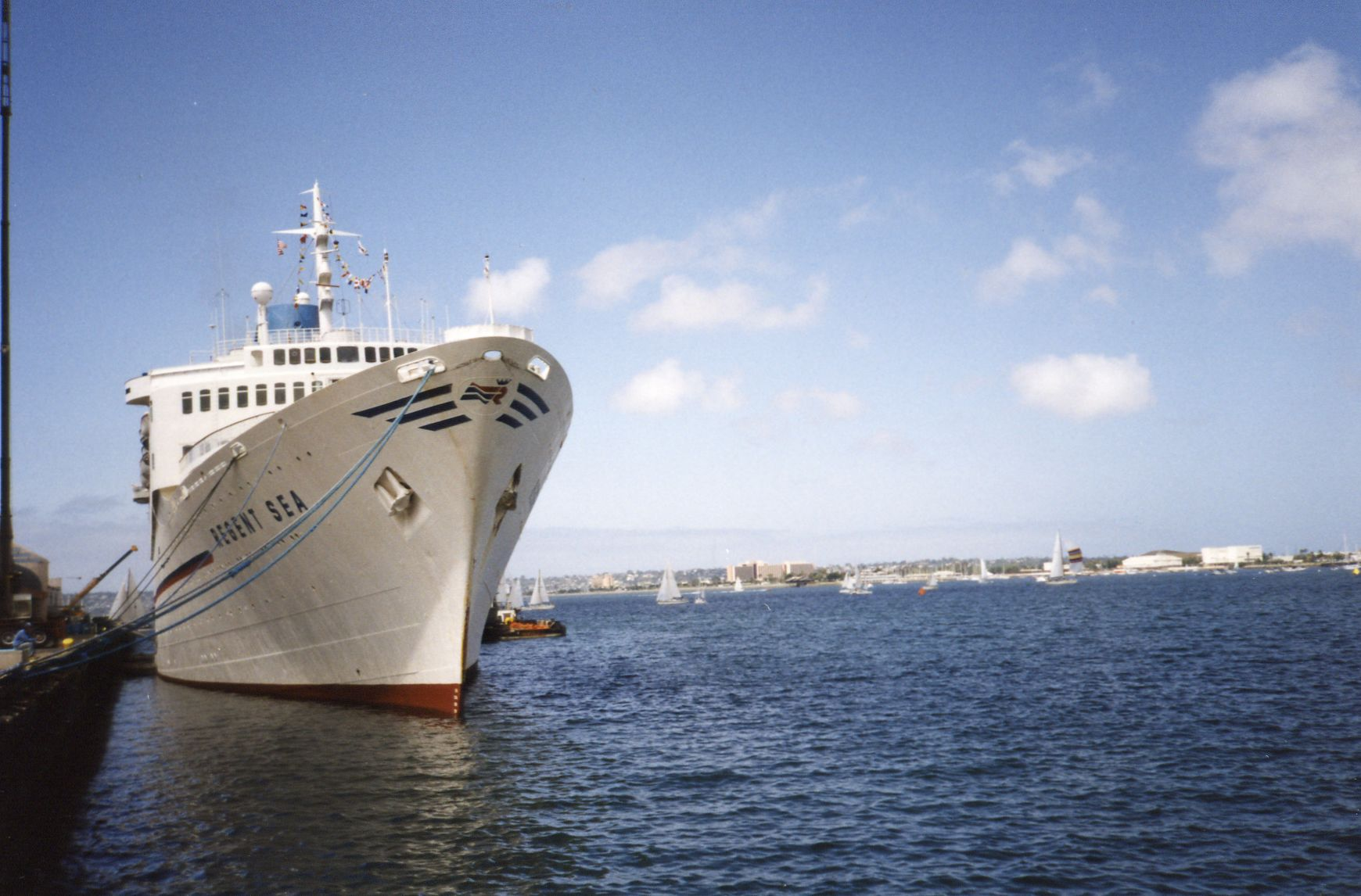
Gripsholm as Regent Sea at San Diego
