= MS Stockholm (1940) =

Italian Oceanliner-turned troopship (1940-1949)

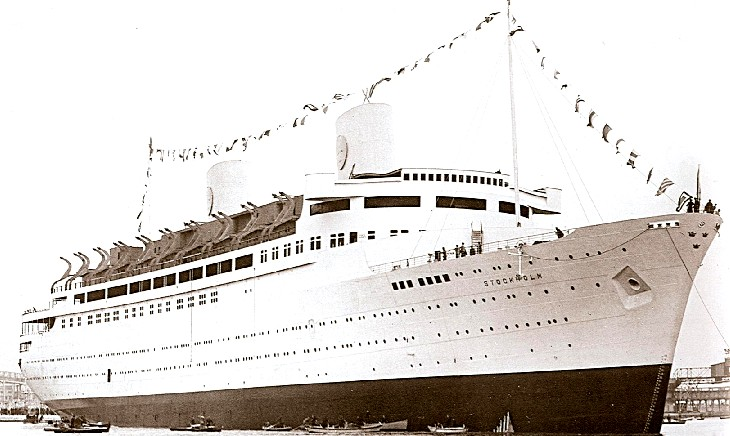
- The second 1941 Stockholm after her launching at the shipyards of Monfalcone in March 1940

History

First ship (1938)
- Name: MS Stockholm
- Ordered: November 1936
- Builder: Cantieri Riuniti dell' Adriatico, Monfalcone, Italy
- Laid down: 10 April 1937
- Launched: 29 May 1938
- Maiden voyage: May 1939 (planned)
- Fate: Destroyed in a fire, 19 December 1938, subsequently scrapped

General characteristics (planned)
- Type: Ocean liner
- Tonnage: 30,390 gross register tons (GRT)
- Length: 194.61 m (638 ft 6 in)
- Beam: 25.35 m (83 ft 2 in)
- Draught: 11.82 m (38 ft 9 in)
- Decks: 10
- Installed power: 3 × 10-cylinder Sulzer diesels; combined 20000 horsepower, 37000 horsepower including auxiliary motors
- Propulsion: Three propellers
- Speed: 19.50 kn (36.11 km/h)
- Boats & landing craft carried: 22 lifeboats
- Capacity: 1295 passengers, 620 (cruising)
- Crew: 600

Second ship (1941-1944)
- Name: 1941: MS Stockholm; 1941–1944: MS Sabaudia
- Owner: 1941: Swedish American Line; 1941–1943: Regia Marina; 1943–1944: Kriegsmarine
- Builder: Cantieri Riuniti dell' Adriatico, Monfalcone, Italy
- Yard number: 1203
- Launched: 10 March 1940
- Completed: October 1941
- Fate: Sunk by British bombers, 6 July 1944, scrapped 1949

General characteristics
- Type: Ocean liner
- Tonnage: 30,390 gross register tons (GRT)
- Length: 195.92 m (642 ft 9 in)
- Beam: 25.35 m (83 ft 2 in)
- Draught: 10.78 m (35 ft 4 in)
- Installed power: 3 × 10-cylinder Sulzer diesels; combined 20000 horsepower
- Propulsion: Three propellers
- Speed: 19.50 kn (36.11 km/h)
- Capacity: 1295 passengers

MS Stockholm was the name of two near-identical ocean liners built by Cantieri Riuniti dell' Adriatico, Monfalcone, Italy between 1936 and 1941 for the Swedish American Line. Neither of the ships entered service for the company that had ordered them—the first ship was entirely destroyed by fire during construction in 1938, while the second was completed in 1941 but immediately sold to the Italian government as a troopship. The second ship served for three years in the Regia Marina and Kriegsmarine under the name MS Sabaudia, until sunk by British bombers outside Trieste in 1944. It is unknown if she was ever actually used as a troopship.

== Concept and background ==
The Swedish American Line had risen to popularity on the transatlantic and cruise traffic during the mid-late 1920s with their two purpose-built ships, MS Gripsholm (1925) and MS Kungsholm (1928). During the mid-1930s the company begun planning a new, larger ship to replace one or several of the older ones. At approximately 30,000 GRT the new ship would be nearly half again as large as the Kungsholm (then the largest ship in the SAL fleet), but due to the differences in passenger demographics she would carry only 1295 passengers compared to the 1544 of the Kungsholm. As with her purpose-built predecessors, it was decided to equip the ship with diesel engines instead of steam turbines favoured by most transatlantic shipping companies of the day. However, with a service speed of 19 knots the new ship would be able to offer faster crossings than the previous SAL ships. The new ship was to be named Stockholm, and would become the second SAL ship to bear the name.

== Construction ==
=== MS Stockholm (1938) ===
In November 1936 the Swedish American Line placed an order for the new Stockholm at Cantieri Riuniti dell' Adriatico, Italy, with the delivery date projected to be in March 1939. On 29 May 1938 she was launched from dry dock and towed to the fitting out berth.

For reasons that are still unknown, the Stockholm caught fire during the night of 19 December 1938 in her fitting-out berth. Strong winds and toxic gasses generated by the fire hampered the firefighting efforts, and the firefighters were left with no choice but to spray water on the ship from the outside, hoping that it would extinguish the fire. Eventually the large amounts of water pumped on the ship caused her to lose stability and sink in her berth. Inspection of the wreck after the fire revealed that—apart from certain engine components— the ship was beyond salvage, and she had to be scrapped. Parts of the vessel that couldn't be reused was scrapped by 1939.

=== MS Stockholm (1941) ===
Despite the loss of the near-complete ship, the Swedish American Line was not prepared to give up on their new ship. After negotiations with the shipyard it was decided that Cantieri Riuniti dell' Adriatico would begin construction of another ship (also to be named Stockholm) based on the same plans as before, with the salvageable parts of the burnt-out ship and equipment not yet installed onboard utilized in the construction of the new Stockholm.

The new Stockholm was launched on 10 March 1940, when World War II was already raging in Europe. Construction proceeded regardless of the war, and the ship was ready for delivery to her owners in October 1941. She completed her trial runs in the Swedish American Line livery, but ultimately the company saw no point in taking delivery of the vessel—the war had caused transatlantic services to be suspended, and it was possible that the ship could not even be safely transferred to neutral Sweden from Italy. As a result, the Stockholm was sold to the Italian government on 3 November 1941, renamed MS Sabaudia and converted to a troopship.

== Service history ==
Information about the Sabaudia's war-time service is conflicting. She was converted to a troopship, but no information is available about her capacity in that function. Most sources claim that she was used as a troopship by the Regia Marina without specifying the campaigns she participated in, while others state she was simply laid up at Trieste after conversion.

On 8 September 1943 Italy signed an armistice with the Allies, resulting in the occupation of Italy by the German Wehrmacht. The Germans took over the Sabaudia on 9 September. Again it is unknown what the ship's exact duties were—she was either used as a troopship or laid up at Trieste as housing ship for German troops.

The Sabaudia was hit during an Allied air raid on Trieste on 6 July 1944 and caught fire. She capsized and sunk the following day, although some sources claim she was purposefully scuttled by German forces. When SAL found out about Sabaudia's sinking, they decided to not have Cantieri Riuniti dell' Adriatico built a new ship and instead had Götaverken in Gothenburg, Sweden build a smaller ship, resulting in the construction and launch of the fourth Stockholm (currently being scrapped as of 2026). The Sabaudia's wreck was raised in 1948 and was subsequently scrapped by 1949.

== Design ==
=== Exterior design ===
Externally the Stockholm was designed with a contemporary, somewhat streamlined appearance. Her forward superstructure was rounded, first raising by one deck from the level of the bow below the forward mast and further back by two more levels. In the 1938 ship the bridge was located on a separate deck on the top of the ship, but on the 1941 ship it was decided to move it down by one deck, giving the ship a more streamlined appearance. The lower-location bridge combined with the ship's other design features made the 1941 Stockholm resemble a smaller version of North German Lloyd's 1929- and 1930-built Blue Riband winners SS Bremen and SS Europa.

=== Interior design ===
For the interior of their new ship, the Swedish American Line decided to adapt the axial layout with a wide central passage: made possible by splitting the funnel uptakes, that had been successfully utilized in the French liners SS l'Atlantique and SS Normandie. On the Stockholm this construction was used to perhaps an even greater practicality than on her predecessors, with the author Philip Dawson praising her interior layout as being "remarkably straightfordward" and stating she would have been "a great success" had she ever entered commercial service. Like SAL's 1928-built Kungsholm, the Stockholm was decorated in modernist art deco style.
