= List of ship decommissionings in 1991 =

The list of ship decommissionings in 1991 includes a chronological list of all ships decommissioned in 1991.

	Operator	Ship	Flag	Class and type	Fate	Other notes
15 January	Fred. Olsen Lines	Bayard	Norway	Cruiseferry	Sold to Color Line	Renamed Christian IV
January	Sealink Stena Line	St Nicholas	Bahamas	Cruiseferry	Rebuilt	Renamed Stena Normandy (under charter from Rederi AB Gotland)
14 February	Royal Navy	Phoebe		Leander-class frigate	Sold as scrap	
22 February	Scandinavian Seaways	Tor Scandinavia	Denmark	Cruiseferry		Renamed Princess of Scandinavia
1 March	Polferries	Rogalin	Poland	Ferry	Chartered to Swansea-Cork Ferries	Renamed Celtic Pride
31 March	Royal Navy	Penelope		Leander-class frigate	Sold to Ecuador in 1991	Renamed Presidente Eloy Alfaro
30 April	United States Navy	Coral Sea		Midway-class aircraft carrier	Scrapped	
19 May	DSB Färjedivision	Peder Paars	Denmark	Ferry	Sold to Stena Line	Renamed Stena Invicta for Sealink Stena Line traffic
30 May	Silja Line	Silvia Regina	Sweden	Cruiseferry	Sold to Stena Line	Renamed Stena Britannica
May	Europe Cruise Line	Eurosun	Bermuda	Cruise ship	Transferred to Orient Line Pte Ltd	Renamed Orient Sun
2 June	Epirotiki Line	Pegasus	Greece	Cruise ship	Burnt at Venice; wreck laid up in Greece.	Sold to Strintzis Line in 1994 for rebuilding into a ferry; renamed Ionian Express; burnt in shipyard; scrapped 1995
30 September	Royal Navy	Charybdis		Leander-class frigate	Sunk as a target	
26 November	United States Navy	Lexington		Essex-class aircraft carrier	Preserved	Corpus Christi, Texas
Date uncertain	National Navy of Uruguay	18 De Julio			Scrapped	

== Bibliography ==
- Friedman, Norman (2006). British Destroyers and Frigates, the Second World War and After. Annapolis, Maryland: Naval Institute Press. ISBN 1-86176-137-6.
