= Calamai =

- Language: Italian

Origin
- Region of origin: Italy

Calamai is an Italian surname. Notable people with the surname include:

- Baldassare Calamai (1797–1851), Italian painter
- Clara Calamai (1909–1998), Italian actress
- Peter Calamai (1943–2019), Canadian science journalist
- Piero Calamai (1897–1972), Italian sailor
