= MTS Oceanos =

Cruise ship that sank in 1991

Coordinates: 32°07′15″S 29°07′13″E

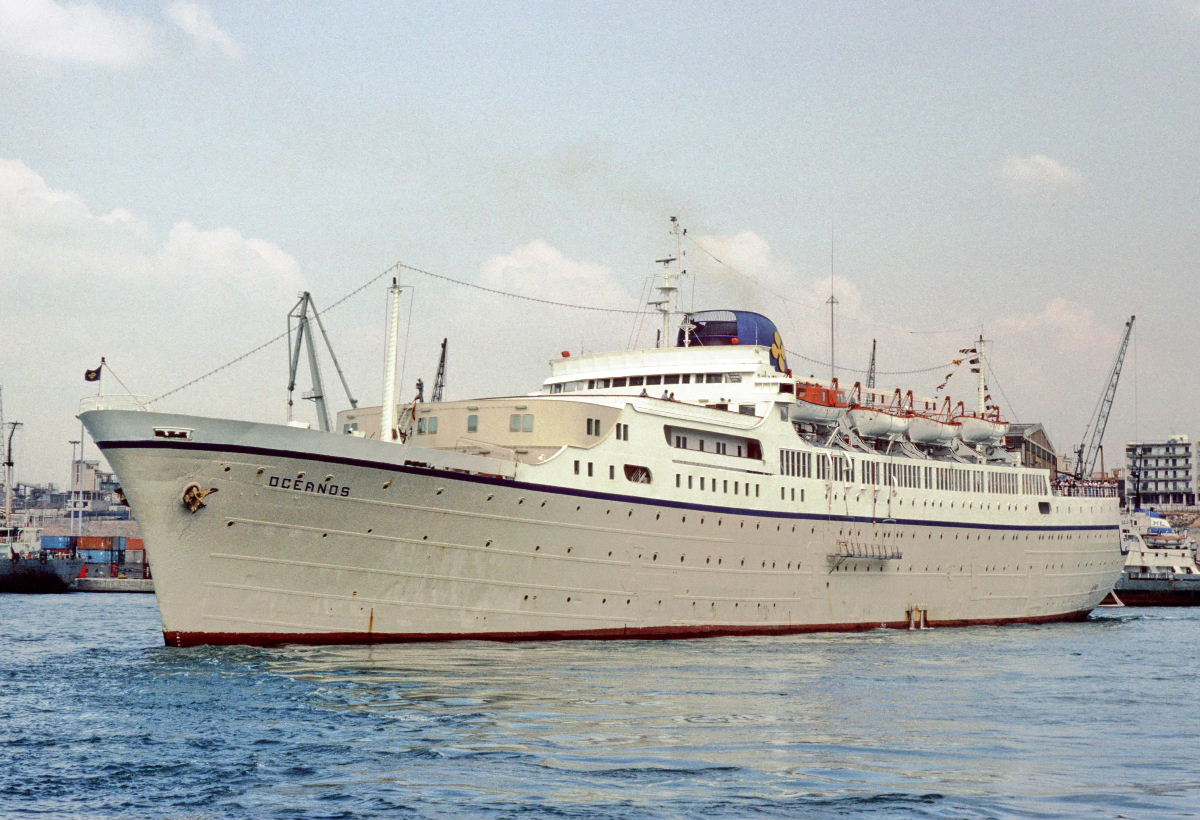
- Oceanos in June 1986

History
- Name: Oceanos
- Namesake: Jean Laborde (as Jean Laborde); Greek: Ocean (as Oceanos)
- Owner: 1953–1970: Messageries Maritimes; 1970-1976: Various; 1976–1991: Epirotiki Lines
- Operator: Epirotiki Lines
- Port of registry: Piraeus, Greece
- Builder: Forges et Chantiers de la Gironde
- Yard number: YS267
- Laid down: 6 March 1951
- Launched: 12 July 1952
- Completed: June 1953
- In service: 1953 - 1991
- Out of service: 4 August 1991
- Identification: IMO number: 5170991
- Fate: Sank due to uncontrolled flooding on 4 August 1991 off the coast of South Africa. All passengers and crew on board rescued with no casualties.

General characteristics
- Type: Cruise ship
- Tonnage: 14,000 GT
- Length: 153 m (502 ft)
- Beam: 20 m (66 ft)
- Draft: 7 m (23 ft)
- Decks: 6–9
- Speed: 18.5 knots (maximum); 16 knots (cruise)
- Capacity: 550 passengers
- Crew: 250

MTS Oceanos was a French-built and Greek-owned cruise ship that sank in 1991 when it suffered uncontrolled flooding. Her captain, Yiannis Avranas, and some of the crew fled the ship without helping the passengers; they were later convicted of negligence. The ship's entertainers made a mayday transmission, launched lifeboats, and helped South African Marines land on the ship from naval helicopters. The actions of the entertainers enabled the rescue of all 571 passengers and crew and attracted international headlines.

Epirotiki Lines had lost two other ships within the three preceding years: the company's flagship Pegasus only two months before, and MV Jupiter, three years before.

== History ==
Oceanos was launched in July 1952 by Forges et Chantiers de la Gironde in Bordeaux, France as Jean Laborde, the last of four sister ships built for Messageries Maritimes. The ships were used on the Marseille–Madagascar–Mauritius service. Jean Laborde went through many different owners and name changes (Jean Laborde, Mykinai, Ancona, Eastern Princess) in the succeeding decades. In 1976, she was acquired by Epirotiki Lines of Greece and registered under the name of Oceanos.

Oceanos was briefly featured in the 1985 film Sky High and with another Epirotiki ship, Apollon XI, in the 1986 film Hardbodies 2.

=== Final voyage ===
Oceanos listing heavily during the rescue operation

Eastern Cape, South Africa

Under charter by TFC Tours, Oceanos – initially delayed by a bomb threat – set out from East London, South Africa on 3 August 1991, and headed for Durban. Captain Yiannis Avranas had been an officer for twenty years and a seaman for thirty. Oceanos headed into 40 kn (74 km/h; 46 mph) winds and 9 m (30 ft) swells. The rough seas caused the "sail-away" party, usually held on deck, to be held inside in the Four Seasons lounge; most passengers chose to stay in their cabins.

While trying to make up lost time, Oceanos encountered further rough seas. The storm worsened as the evening progressed and when the first sitting of dinner was served, the waiters could hardly carry the trays of food without dropping something.

==== Flooding ====
Earlier repairs to the waste disposal system had not been completed, which meant that a vital ventilation pipe which ran through the watertight aft bulkhead and the non-return valves were not replaced. It is believed that after a series of freak waves slammed against the ship, the pipe's shell plating burst open and began filling the compartment with seawater. At about 9:30 p.m., a muffled explosion was heard and Oceanos lost power. The ship started taking on water, rapidly flooding the engine room.

Once the engines stopped, the ship had rolled over to the point that in the lounge, which is where the passengers had gathered, crockery and cutlery began sliding off the tables and potted plants fell over.

No alarm or announcement had been given that the ship was in trouble; with other entertainers working on the cruise, Moss Hills, a musician from Zimbabwe and former member of Four Jacks and a Jill who had been performing with his wife Tracy in the lounge, explored below decks, discovered that Oceanos appeared to be sinking, and were informed by the cruise director, Lorraine Betts, that the captain had given the order to abandon ship and some crew had already left in a lifeboat. They began launching the remaining lifeboats, with up to 90 people in each, but were unable to start their engines. When the ship's worsening list to starboard made it unsafe to continue, Hills and several passengers went to the bridge to look for the crew, but found it unmanned. They used the radio phone to broadcast a mayday distress call until Hills received a response.

By the next morning rescuers found Oceanos adrift just off Coffee Bay, on the Wild Coast.

==== Rescue efforts ====
Two small ships in the vicinity were first on the scene, and provided the ship's coordinates to the South African authorities. Rescue helicopters began arriving three hours later, and winched passengers and remaining crew to safety, with Hills continuing in charge of the orderly evacuation. Thirteen of the sixteen helicopters were South African Air Force Pumas, nine of which hoisted 225 passengers off the deck. They were assisted by the lifeboats of the Dutch cargo ship Nedlloyd Mauritius, which had responded to the distress call.

Hills later said that, searching for Captain Avranas, he had discovered him smoking on the fantail and he said "I think he was in deep, deep shock." Hills reportedly rescued Avranas' dog and released his canary. A South African Navy diver testified that the captain had insisted on being taken ashore by the first helicopter. Entertainment manager Robin Boltman told a newspaper: "Later in the morning, Captain Avarnasi (sic) even contacted me from shore to ask how things were going." Boltman was credited with gathering the passengers in the lounge and playing music to calm them. Among the entertainers onboard was the South African cabaret performer Alvon Collison, who later reported that he had begun singing an impromptu repertoire as the ship was sinking, in an effort to keep the passengers' spirits up. In his characteristic style, he managed to weave a comical moment into his narrative of the tumultuous events, telling reporters that he had started singing "Bye Bye Miss American Pie", when he suddenly realised that the next line was going to be "This'll be the day that I die" and quickly switched to another song.

An inflatable had to be launched to rescue some passengers who panicked and jumped into the water. South African Navy divers conducted a final search of the ship from bow to stern, ensuring that no survivors had been left behind after there had been an erroneous report of 21 passengers still being unaccounted for. Oceanos rolled onto her starboard side and sank bow first approximately 45 minutes after the last person was airlifted from the deck, with her bow striking the seabed 94 metres (308 ft) below the surface, bringing the stern to a vertical position. The final minutes of her sinking were captured on video and broadcast by ABC News. All 571 people on board were saved.

=== Aftermath ===
The circumstances of the sinking, including the successful efforts of the Oceanos's entertainment staff and Coast Guard which ensured the survival of everyone on board, resulted in widespread international media attention. Captain Avranas, in particular, received extensive backlash for neglecting his duties. He stated that he left the ship first to arrange for a rescue effort, and then supervised the rescue from a helicopter because "the batteries on the crew's walkie-talkies had died, meaning that he had no communications with his crew or with other rescue craft". He was quoted soon after the sinking as saying, "When I order abandon the ship, it doesn't matter what time I leave. Abandon is for everybody. If some people like to stay, they can stay." In 1992, he and five other officers were convicted of negligence by a Greek board of inquiry for fleeing the ship without helping the passengers.

On March 6, 1992, one of the rescuers involved, Able Seaman AB Wiley of the South African Defence Force, was awarded the Honoris Crux Gold decoration by Minister of Defense Roelf Meyer for his extraordinary efforts to save the ship's passengers.

== Media ==
Dateline NBC aired a documentary of the incident on 23 May 2010.

The sinking is the subject of a song called "Oceanos" by Celtic rock band Coast. It was also discussed in an episode of Nova on 18 April 2012, entitled "Why Ships Sink", which focused mainly on the Costa Concordia accident (whose commanding officer also fled while passengers were still on board). Hills was interviewed in the special, and related that some years later he had been on board when the MS Achille Lauro of Star Lauro sank.

The rescue featured in episode 4 of Shockwave, first aired 21 December 2007.

The NPR radio show and podcast Snap Judgment featured an account of the sinking by Moss Hills. The show Extreme Weather: The Survivors featured a segment on the sinking.

In 2022, Hills – who later became a cruise director – was interviewed by Jane Garvey for BBC Radio 4's series Life Changing.

South African television reporter Gary Alfonso, who was stationed in Port Elizabeth at the South African Broadcasting Corporation in 1991, received a phone call from the South African Airforce at 1am, saying helicopters were on their way from Cape Town to the position off the eastern Cape coast where the Oceanos was in trouble. Alfonso and his wife Teresa had been on the Oceanos the day before, covering the wedding of a couple from Queenstown on board the vessel, which did a loop out and back to East London for the wedding guests. At daybreak Alfonso was on board one of the 3 helicopters from Cape Town which had joined the 2 which had flown from Durban to start the process of pulling the 571 passengers and crew up from the badly listing Oceanos. One by one the passengers were hoisted up while the pilots tried to steady the helicopters in moderate windy conditions, and people were dropped off at a nearby resort The Haven, where medical staff and emergency teams attended to injuries and official matters.

== Wreck ==
The Oceanos wreck lies at a depth of between 92 m (302 ft) and 97 m (318 ft), about 5 km (2.7 nmi; 3.1 mi) offshore. Divers have visited her, but strong currents make the dive difficult. Photographs taken in 2002 show that the bridge section has collapsed.

== In popular culture ==
- The MTS Oceanos and another Epirotiki ship, the Apollon XI, were featured in the 1986 film Hardbodies 2.
- On October 14, 2016, the podcast "Snap Judgment" aired the story in episode 726, "This Will Be The Day That I Die: The Sinking Of The Cruiseship Oceanos - Snap #726 – Down With The Ship". It was repeated on December 15, 2017, and has also featured in other "Double Trouble/Snap Classic" episodes (November 2021, s12, e24 and August 2024, s15, e35)
- In June 2025, the podcast "Against the Odds" aired a dramatized account of the story in season 55, "Oceanos: Rescue off the Wild Coast".

== See also ==
- The captain goes down with the ship
- Costa Concordia disaster
- Sinking of MV Sewol
- SS Yarmouth Castle
