= Yiannis Avranas =

Greek sea captain (born 1940)

- Born: 1940 (age 85–86)
- Occupation: sea captain
- Employer: Epirotiki Line
- Known for: Captain of MTS Oceanos
- Spouse: Davina Avrana

Yiannis Avranas (Greek: Γιάννης Αβρανάς; born c. 1940) is a Greek former sea captain who commanded the cruise ship Oceanos when she sank off the Wild Coast of the Transkei, South Africa, on Sunday 4 August 1991. He was one of the first to be rescued while most of his passengers remained onboard the sinking ship. A Greek maritime Board of Enquiry found him and his officers guilty of negligence. In 1994, his English wife Davina published a book about the sinking entitled The Oceanos Tragedy.

== MTS Oceanos ==
Captain Yiannis Avranas had been an officer for 20 years and at sea for more than thirty years at the time of the Oceanos sinking. He was married to British national Davina Avrana.

=== Foundering ===
On 3 August 1991, the Oceanos set out from East London, South Africa and headed to Durban. She headed into 40-knot (20 m/s) winds and 9 m (30 ft) swells. The storm worsened, and at approximately 21:30 UTC+2, while off the Wild Coast of the Transkei, a muffled explosion was heard. The Oceanos lost power following a leak in the engine room's sea chest. The chief engineer reported to Captain Avranas that water was entering the hull and flooding the generator room. The generators were shut down because the rising water would have short circuited them. The ship was left adrift.

Realising the fate of the ship, the crew reportedly fled in panic, neglecting the standard procedure of closing the lower deck portholes. No alarm was raised. Passengers remained ignorant of the events taking place until they witnessed the first signs of flooding in the lower decks. At this stage, eyewitness accounts reveal that many of the crew, including Captain Avranas, were already packed and ready to depart.

=== Rescue operation ===
Finding the ship's bridge abandoned, Moss Hills, an on-board entertainer, used the radio phone to broadcast a mayday until another ship answered. The South African Navy, along with the South African Air Force, launched a mission to airlift the passengers and crew to the nearby settlements of The Haven and Hole in the Wall, about 10 km (5 1/2 nmi) south of Coffee Bay.

Hills organized the orderly evacuation of passengers by the helicopters, later reporting that Avranas was among the first to be winched up to a rescue helicopter. Remaining onboard, Hills and fellow entertainer Julian Butler began directing the rescue efforts of the entertainment staff to get the passengers off the sinking vessel. According to Robin Boltman, another entertainer and survivor of the sinking, "later in the morning, Captain Avarnasi [sic] even contacted me from shore to ask how things were going." The entertainers were among the last to be rescued from the stricken ship.

== Aftermath ==
=== Defence of his actions ===
Captain Avranas claimed that he left the ship first in order to arrange for a rescue effort, and then supervised it from a helicopter. According to the International Herald Tribune, "Avranas said he had known when he left the ship that there were 170 passengers and crew still aboard [but this was] the only way [to] ensure the safety of all those aboard", furthermore "after checking the situation from the shore, he said, he flew back to the ship on a helicopter, intending to go back on board. But the weather was so bad that the helicopter crew advised against boarding". Avranas was quoted in the New York Times as saying, "When I give the order abandon ship, it doesn't matter what time I leave. Abandonment is for everybody, if some people want to stay, they can stay."

Captain Alevizos Klaudatos, head of Epirotiki Line, was quoted in The Star as saying: "Of course the crew members assigned to the boats have to enter first in order to assist the embarkation of the passengers", "as regards the captain abandoning the vessel, this is untrue and he has maintained his position throughout in assisting the rescue in the most effective way".

=== Legal conviction ===
A Greek board of inquiry found Avranas and four officers negligent in their handling of the disaster. He was never incarcerated and Epirotiki gave him command of a ferry until his retirement.

=== Media example ===
Avranas has attracted extensive media coverage for his actions during the sinking, often being vilified and used as an example of poor professional behaviour while in command. Following the Costa Concordia disaster in 2012, parallels were drawn between the behaviour of Avranas and the captain of the Concordia, Francesco Schettino.

== See also ==
- The captain goes down with the ship
