= Hardbodies 2 =

1986 film by Mark Griffiths

- Theatrical release poster
- Directed by: Mark Griffiths
- Written by: Mark Griffiths; Curtis Wilmot
- Produced by: Dimitri Logothetis; Jeff Begun
- Starring: Brad Zutaut; Fabiana Udenio; James Karen; Alba Francesca; Roberta Collins; Sorrells Pickard; Brenda Bakke; Sam Temeles; Louise Baker
- Cinematography: Tom Richmond
- Edited by: Andy Blumenthal
- Music by: Eddie Arkin; Jay Levy
- Distributed by: CineTel Films
- Release date: September 12, 1986
- Running time: 88 minutes
- Country: United States
- Language: English
- Box office: $78,068

Hardbodies 2 is a 1986 adult comedy film, It is sequel to Hardbodies (1984). It was directed by Mark Griffiths and featured Brad Zutaut, Fabiana Udenio, James Karen and Alba Francesca. The plot involves two men, Scotty and Rags, and pair of film crews in Greece, assuming the identities of students taking part in Semester at Sea, and derives humor from the use of profanity and nudity. The film was released by CineTel Films and it has a run time of 88 minutes. Leonard Maltin gave the film a "bomb" rating. The film features the Epirotiki Lines cruise ships Apollon XI and MTS Oceanos (the setting of Semester at Sea), which ran aground in 1989 due to Typhoon Dan and sank in 1991 due to uncontrolled flooding, respectively.

In Australia, the unrelated Miracle Beach was sold under the title Miracle Beach: Hard Bodies II, even though Hardbodies 2 had been released in the country in 1987.

== Cast ==
- Brad Zutaut as Scotty Palmer
- Fabiana Udenio as Cleo / Princess
- James Karen as Logan
- Alba Francesca as Zacharly
- Sorrells Pickard as Carlton Ashley
- Roberta Collins as Lana Logan
- Brenda Bakke as Morgan
- Sam Temeles as "Rags"
- Louise Baker as "Cookie"
- Curt Wilmot as Sean Kingsley
- Alexandros Mylonas as Brucie
- Yula Gavala as Kidnapper's Wife
- Giorgos Tzifos as Cleo's Father
- Giorgos Kotanidis as Kidnapper
