= Hole-in-the-Wall (Eastern Cape) =

Natural arch on the Wild Coast, Eastern Cape, South Africa

Hole-in-the-Wall Xhosa: esiKhaleni, lit. 'Place of sound'
- Natural arch
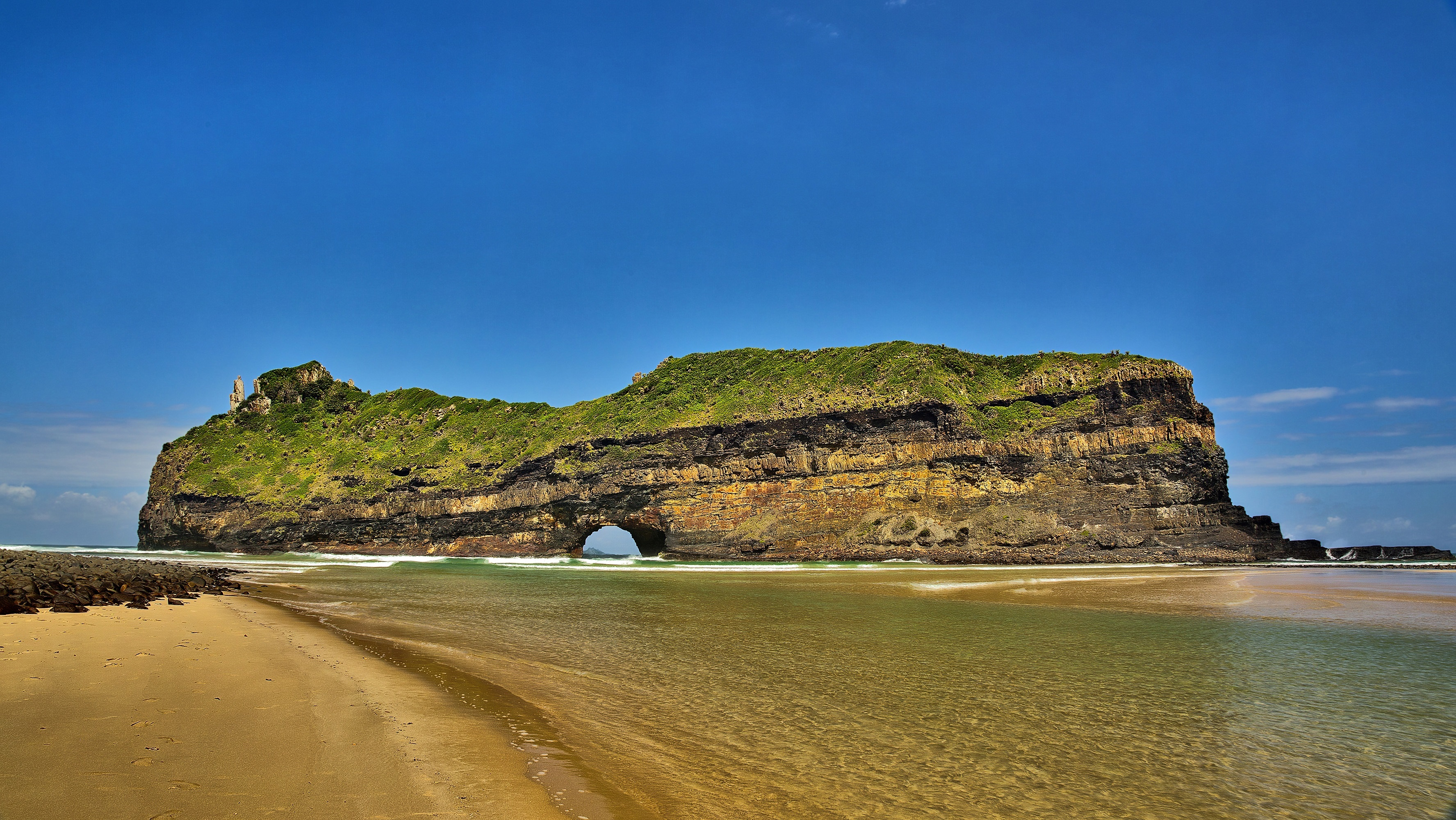

- Coordinates: 32°02′28″S 29°06′33″E
- Location: Coffee Bay, South Africa
- Elevation: 0 m (0 ft)

The Hole-in-the-Wall is an natural arch in South Africa. The formation consists of a tidal island containing a natural arch that takes the form of a hole pierced through a wall of sandstone and shale by the waves of the sea located at the mouth of the Mpako River, about 8 km due south of Coffee Bay on the Wild Coast Region, Eastern Cape in South Africa.

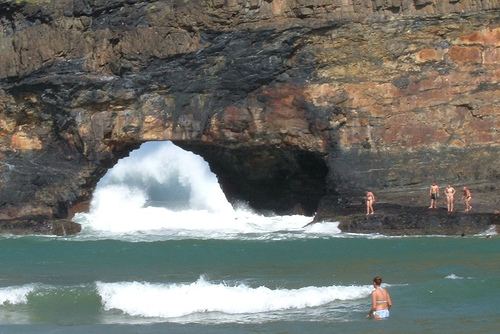
Hole-in-the-Wall with swimmers in the foreground.

The natural arch is large enough for a sailboat to cross underneath it with ease. It is reachable by foot just off the beach joining the rock formation to the land at low tide. Visitors and tourists to the formation may find accommodation in the nearby village of the same name.

The local Xhosa inhabitants call it esiKhaleni, 'Place of sound'. According to a Xhosa legend a beautiful maiden who lived in a village on the shores of a coastal lagoon separated from the sea by a sheer cliff, fell in love with a man of the legendary water people (abantubomlambo). On hearing of the unnatural liaison, her angry father forbade her to see her lover or leave the village. One night her lover came to the cliff with his people and rammed a gaping hole through the cliff using the head of an enormous fish. Through this breach they streamed to the village singing and shouting; all the villagers hid, except the maiden, who rushed into the arms of her lover. She was never heard of again. Under certain conditions the waves slap the rocks with a resounding crack, and the hole roars during storms. Tribesmen believe that these are the sounds of the sea-people singing and shouting, hence the name of the place, esiKhaleni.

The ship Santo Alberto ran aground on 24 March 1593 near Hole-in-the-Wall. Twenty eight Portuguese sailors and 34 slaves drowned while 125 sailors and 160 slaves made it ashore. Under Nuno Velho most of the survivors made it to safety after they walked to Maputo, Mozambique.

On 4/5 August 1991 the luxury liner Oceanos sank 5 km off shore near Hole-in-the-Wall. All 571 passengers and crew were rescued, mostly by helicopter.
