= MV Munster (1947) =

MV Orpheus
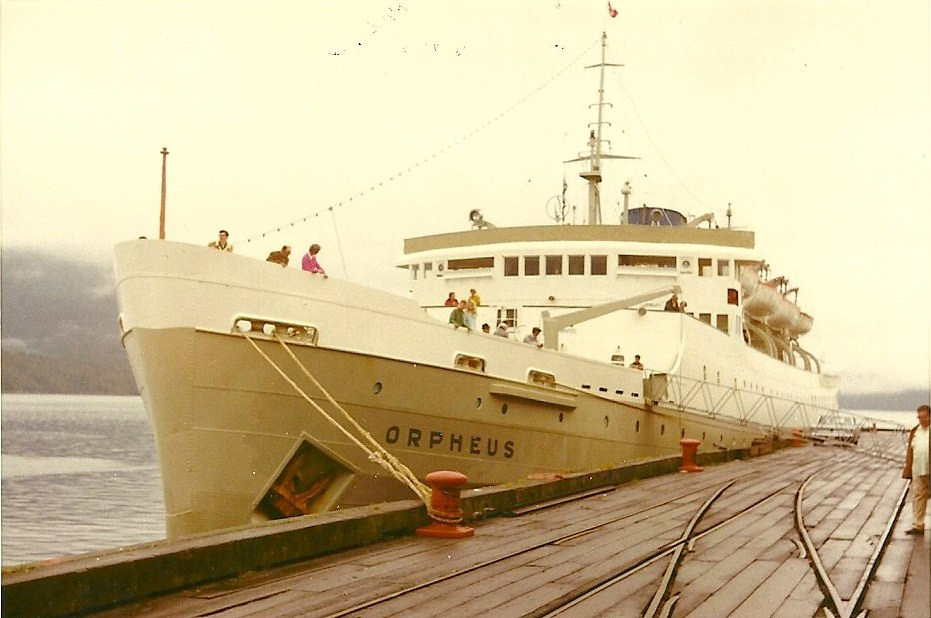
- MV Orpheus docked at Prince Rupert, B.C in October 1970

History
- Name: MV Munster
- Builder: Harland & Wolff
- Launched: 25 March 1947
- Completed: 17 January 1948
- Fate: Commissioned by B&I Line
- Name: MV Munster
- Owner: B&I Line
- Acquired: 1948
- Fate: Transferred to Epirotiki Lines
- Name: MV Theseus
- Owner: Epirotiki Lines
- Acquired: 1969
- Decommissioned: 1998
- Renamed: MV Orpheus (c.1970)
- Stricken: 2000
- Identification: IMO number: 5243762
- Fate: Decommissioned and Scrapped

General characteristics
- Tonnage: 5,078 tonnes GRT
- Length: 110 metres (360 ft)
- Speed: 15 knots
- Capacity: 1,500; later, 372
- Crew: 105

MV Orpheus was a cruise ship launched on 25 March 1947 and completed on 17 January 1948 by the shipyard Harland & Wolff in Belfast as Munster for B&I Line. It replaced the earlier Munster, built in 1938, which sank in 1940.

By 1967, the ship, onto which cars were loaded by crane, began to look dated compared to newer ships of the roll-on/roll-off variety. It was sold in 1969 to Epirotiki Lines.

It was renamed Theseus for about a year before being given its final name, Orpheus. Epirotiki overhauled the ship for two years to bring it in line with market conditions, reducing its capacity for passengers from 1,500 to 372 while increasing passenger comfort, adding a pool and redesigning the cabins.

Orpheus was relocated to the Americas where it sailed in Alaska, Mexico, and Panama for about one year. It was then relocated to Greece and operated in the Mediterranean.

In 1974, the cruise line Swan Hellenic chartered the ship. Despite its age, Orpheus was very popular with British passengers, but by the mid-1980s it became difficult for the ship to hide its age. Swan Hellenic replaced it with Minerva. Orpheus was decommissioned in 1998 and scrapped in 2000.
