= USS Vixen (PG-53) =

Gunboat of the United States Navy

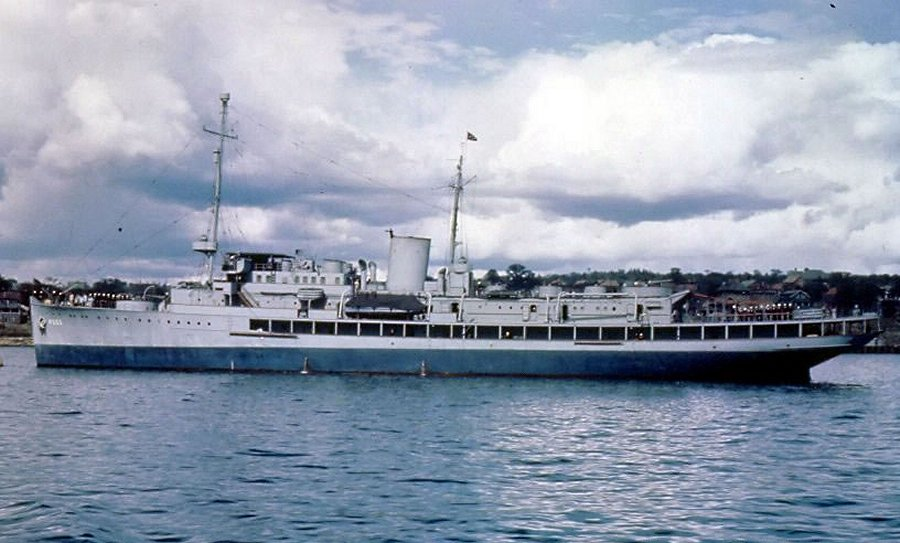
- USS Vixen (PG-53)

History

Germany, United States
- Name: Orion
- Owner: Julius Forstmann
- Builder: Krupp Germaniawerft, Kiel, Germany
- Yard number: 502
- Laid down: 1929
- Launched: August 1929
- Fate: Acquired by the US Navy, 13 November 1940

United States
- Name: USS Vixen
- Namesake: Vixen (Female fox)
- Builder: Sullivan Drydock and Repair Co., Brooklyn, New York (Conversion)
- Acquired: 13 November 1940
- Commissioned: 25 February 1941
- Decommissioned: 24 May 1946
- Stricken: 3 July 1946
- Fate: Sold into commercial service, 21 January 1947; Broken up, 2005

General characteristics (USS Vixen)
- Type: Gunboat
- Displacement: 3,774 long tons (3,835 t)
- Length: 333 ft 2 in (101.55 m)
- Beam: 46 ft 7 in (14.20 m)
- Draft: 16 ft (4.9 m)
- Propulsion: 2 × 1,800 bhp (1,342 kW) Krupp diesel engines; 2 shafts
- Speed: 15 knots (28 km/h; 17 mph)
- Complement: 279 officers and enlisted
- Armament: 4 × 3 in (76 mm) guns; 7 × .50 cal (12.7 mm) machine guns; 2 × .30 cal (7.62 mm) machine guns; 2 × Depth charge tracks

Panama
- Name: Orion
- Acquired: 1954
- Out of service: 1965
- Fate: Obtained by Epirotiki Lines, 1965
- Notes: Operated as a cruise ship

Greece
- Name: MS Argonaut
- Operator: Epirotiki Lines
- Acquired: 1965

History

USS Vixen (PG-53) was a gunboat of the United States Navy during World War II, in which she served as a flagship to the Commanders of the Atlantic Fleet.

== Construction ==
Built as the Orion by Krupp Germaniawerft at Kiel, Germany in 1929, the steel-hulled yacht was purchased from German-American woollen manufacturer Julius Forstmann on 13 November 1940. Converted to a gunboat at Brooklyn, New York, by the Sullivan Drydock and Repair Corporation, the erstwhile pleasure craft was renamed Vixen and designated PG-53. Commissioned at her conversion yard on 25 February she got underway for the Caribbean on 5 March 1941.

== Service history ==
=== 1941–1942 ===
During her shakedown cruise, the gunboat called at St. Thomas, Virgin Islands; San Juan, Puerto Rico; and Guantanamo Bay, Cuba, before heading north for Norfolk, Virginia. She then cruised up the eastern seaboard to New London, Connecticut, and back to Norfolk again before she returned to New London on 23 May to assume duties as flagship for Commander, Submarines, Atlantic Fleet, (ComSubLant), Rear Admiral Richard S. Edwards.

The gunboat served Admiral Edwards throughout 1941. During this time, she participated in ceremonies off the Isles of Shoals, New Hampshire, on 22 June, honoring the crew of USS O-9 - a training submarine which had gone down during practice diving tests on 20 June and had failed to surface. From 30 July to 13 August, she took part in Fleet maneuvers off New River, North Carolina; voyaged to Bermuda in October; and cruised to Argentia, Newfoundland; and Casco Bay, Maine, before returning to New London on 6 December - the day before Japan's attack on Pearl Harbor.

Vixen remained at New London until 20 December, when Commander, Submarines, Atlantic, hauled down his flag. That day, the gunboat got underway for Newport, Rhode Island, where she went alongside the recently vacated flagship Augusta (CA-31) to pick up Admiral Ernest J. King's papers and belongings for transportation to the Washington Navy Yard. Earlier that day, King had flown from Quonset Point, Rhode Island, to Washington D.C. to commence his tour of duty as Commander in Chief, United States Fleet. Vixen got underway on the day after Christmas and arrived at the nation's capital on the 28th. Two days later, on 30 December, Admiral King broke his four-starred flag at Vixen's main. The gunboat served as his flagship, berthed at the Washington Navy Yard, until 17 June 1942 when she was relieved by Dauntless (PG-61).

=== 1942–1944 ===
While Vixen was undergoing the refit which followed, Admiral Royal E. Ingersoll, Commander in Chief, Atlantic Fleet, was laying plans for the yacht's future deployment. "I hope to get the Vixen in mid-July," he wrote an acquaintance on 10 June; "I will then be able to move to spots where there is more activity than here, and where I can see people, without their having to come to the 'mountain'."

Vixen embarked Admiral Ingersoll at Newport on 21 July and got underway for Boston in company with Charles F. Hughes (DD-428). Over the subsequent months, the ship ranged up and down the eastern seaboard from Maine to the Caribbean isles. Calling at Portland, Maine; New London; Philadelphia; New York City; Norfolk; Portsmouth, New Hampshire; Bermuda; the Dominican Republic; Trinidad; Curaçao - the ship's itinerary showed clearly that Ingersoll had mobility and was utilizing it to the fullest. From this base of operations, Ingersoll kept his finger on the pulse of German U-boat activity and the problems confronting the officers and ships under his command. Under his leadership, the Atlantic Fleet slowly, but surely, turned the tide against the Nazi submarines. His close contact with his commanders enabled Ingersoll to know local conditions and thus to deploy his forces where they could be most useful.

=== 1944–1945 ===
On 15 November 1944, Admiral Jonas H. Ingram relieved Ingersoll as Commander in Chief, Atlantic Fleet, and broke his flag in Vixen. Ingram, who had so successfully conducted United States-Brazilian relations during the period when he commanded American naval forces in the South Atlantic, would fly his flag in the gunboat through the end of hostilities.

=== Decommissioning and sale ===
Vixen was decommissioned on 24 May 1946 and struck from the Navy List on 3 July 1946. Transferred to the War Shipping Administration, Vixen was sold on 21 January 1947.

=== In commercial service, 1947–2004 ===
Vixen reverted to her original name, Orion, and operated as a cruise ship in the Panama region.

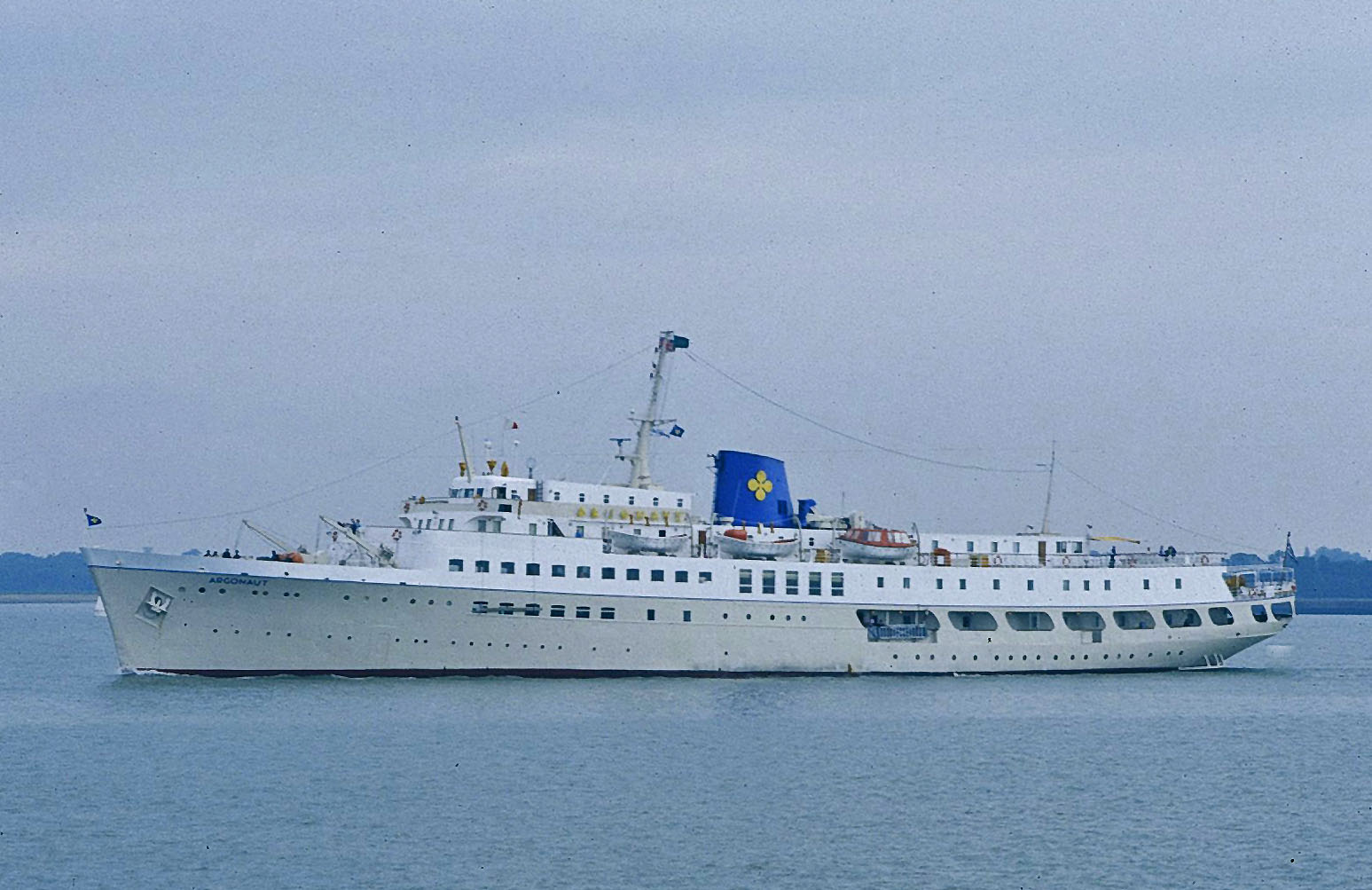
Argonaut in Harwich, July 1986

In 1965 she was saved from the scrap yard by Epirotiki Lines of Greece. She was taken to Pireus in Greece where she was rebuilt from the hull upwards and turned into the Argonaut, a luxury cruise ship under charter to Raymond Whitcombe, touring, amongst others, places such as the Mediterranean, Caribbean, and the Fjords of Norway. In 1995 she was sold to Memnon Tours of Cairo, Egypt, and renamed Regina Maris, operating a seven-night cruise in the Red Sea, and later in 2001, the Mediterranean, under charter to Phoenix Reisen of Germany.

She was laid up in Alexandria, Egypt, from late 2001 until 2004 when she was sold and taken to Greece to be used as a floating hotel during the Athens 2004 Summer Olympics. She was sold for scrap once the Games were over, and taken to Turkey where she was broken up in 2005.
