= Epirotiki Line =

Greek cruise ship company

Epirotiki Lines
- Industry: Passenger and merchant shipping
- Founded: 1850
- Founder: Anastassios Potamianos
- Defunct: 2005
- Successor: Royal Olympic Cruise Lines
- Headquarters: Piraeus, Greece
- Area served: Worldwide
- Services: Cruises and cargo transportation

Epirotiki was a shipping company that began in 1850. Epirotiki Line operated cruise vessels, cargo and tanker vessels.

== Foundation ==
Anastassios Potamianos began his first shipping venture in 1850 transporting cargo and passengers along the River Danube between the island of Cephalonia and the city of Brăila. Assisting Anastassios was his nephew, Giorgos Potamianos. When Anastassios Potamianos died in 1902 Giorgos undertook the management of the company and took the emblem of the Byzantine Cross as the company's trademark, and changed the company name to Epirotiki. In 1916 Giorgos moved to the new centre of shipping of Piraeus, acquiring his first steam powered ship. By 1926 the company owned 15 passenger vessels ranging between 800 and 1500 GRT.

== World War II ==
During World War II, Piraeus was destroyed by German air attacks on the city. Only one vessel was saved, the G.Potamianos, which was appropriated by the Allies. At the conclusion of the war Epirotiki began its revival with the acquisition of three ships, ushering in its modern era.

== Modern era ==
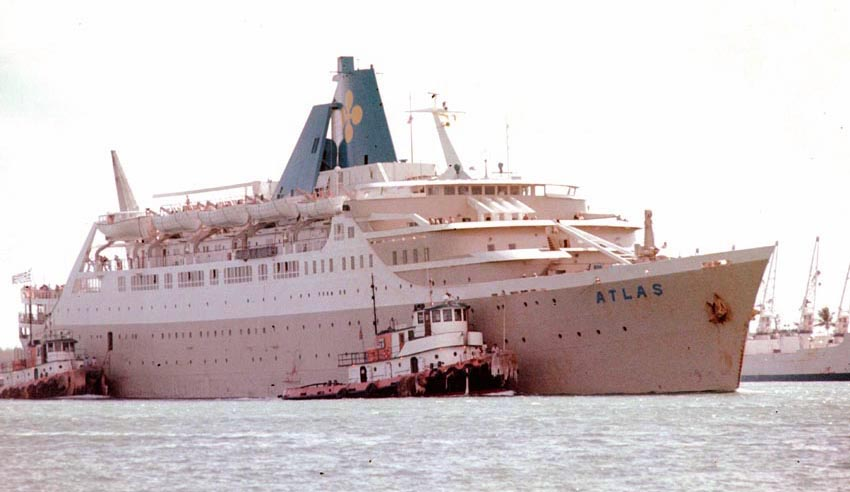
MTS Atlas

Initially Epirotiki focused entirely on the cruise ship market and started round trip cruises operating in the Aegean Sea, Greek Islands and Eastern Mediterranean. Acquisitions of vessels such as Semiramis, Pegasus (I) and Hermes helped in the company's expansion. In the 1960s, Epirotiki continued to expand its operation, adding a number of Caribbean destinations. Vessels acquired in this period included the Argonaut, Jason, Orpheus, Apollon XI, and Poseidon among others.

The cruise industry grew quickly in the 1970s, and Epirotiki became the largest cruise ship company in Greece and the Eastern Mediterranean with additions to its fleet such as the Jupiter, Oceanos, World Renaissance, Odysseus, Mistral, Pegasus (II) and Triton. During the 1980s and after the company diversified into dry cargo carriers and crude oil tankers under separate management.

Epirotiki Lines reached South America in 1978 operating out of São Paulo to take advantage of the fact that Italian lines could not handle the number of tourists in the tropical summer high season. The Greek company used the Atlantis with a crew of Greeks, Italians (mostly) and some Brazilians (mostly chambermaids, to facilitate dialogue on board. The tour operator sold round-trip cruises using the Single Cabin regime, with relative success. This vessel was once the Adonis, sister ship to the fleet's Eros and Jason; all refurbished as luxury tourist ships. The route chosen along the Brazilian coast linked the ports of Santos (SP), Angra dos Reis (RJ) and Rio de Janeiro (RJ). It is reported that one of the heiresses of the Hellenic business came aboard from Greece, a shaggy, purple short-haired, sixty-year-old lady, overseeing the vessel's services herself. In this business, the Consulate of Greece in Brazil, in Salvador (BA), nurtured the transatlantic booths with extensive printed tourist material with colour photographs and several maps with simulated 2-D terrestrial relief, with the main sea routes of the Greek coast and shorelines.

The peak of the company's global operations was reached in 1990, with the Greek headquarters in Piraeus (Akit Miaouli, 87), consolidating offices in London (6 Quadrant Arcade, Regent St), Paris (8, Rue Auber 9a), Rome (Via Barberini, 47) and New York City (608 Fifth Ave), and for South America business its general representative and travel agent for the Latin America market was the partner Airtour Operator, in São Paulo.

In the marine tourism sector Epirotiki consolidated its position through partnerships and mergers. In 1993 Epirotiki made a partnership with Carnival Cruise Lines, purchasing ships from Carnival in exchange for shares in Epirotiki. The company acquired the vessels Pallas Athena, Olympic and Apollon (II).

Around the same time, however, the company faced difficulties, as three of its cruise ships (Jupiter, Pegasus and Oceanos) sank between 1988 and 1991.

In 1995 Epirotiki merged its operations with Sun Line, creating a new company named Royal Olympic Cruise Lines. Initially maintaining its two brand names, Royal Olympic Cruise Lines began planning a public offering of the company in 1997. The company restructured its holdings, creating a new entity, Royal Olympia Cruise Lines, and listed on the NASDAQ stock exchange (ROCLF) in 1998. The new company collapsed in 2005 and its ships were sold off.

== Fleet ==
A list of operating vessels in the fleet:

=== Former Fleet ===
Ship	In Epirotiki service	Notes	Image
Semiramis	(1953–1979)	Semiramis was built as the Calabar of Elder Dempster in 1935, for use on their West African local services. She was bought by Epirotiki in 1953, and is considered by many to have been the first Greek cruise ship. She remained in service until 1979 and was scrapped the following year.	
Atreus	(1958–1970)	Atreus was built in 1914 as the Aarlborghus of DFDS. She was renamed Frederikshavn in 1936 and sold to Epirotiki in 1958. She ran until 1968 and was scrapped in 1970.	
Hermes	(1955–1960)	Hermes was built as the Bergen Line's Jupiter of 1915. She was purchased by Epirotiki in 1955.	
Hermes	(1961–1974)	Hermes was built in 1930 for the Canadian Pacific West Coast as Princess Joan. Original builders were Fairfields of Glasgow, and its service was between Seattle, Victoria and Vancouver. She originally had three funnels, which was trunked into a single large funnel when the ship was bought by Epirotiki in 1960, entering service the following year. In Epirotiki service it started as three-class ships, on a passenger and car ferry service between Italy-Greece-Cyprus-Israel. She was later used for cruising. Hermes (2) spent her later years as accommodation ship in Scotland, and scrapped in 1974.	
Pegasus	(1961–1976)	Pegasus was built in 1930 for the Canadian Pacific West Coast as Princess Elizabeth. With her sister ship Princess Joan her service was between Seattle, Victoria and Vancouver. Along with her sister ship had three funnels. With her sister ship sold in Epirotiki in 1961 and renamed Pegasus. She was used as a car passenger ferry between Italy-Greece-Cyprus-Israel. She was later used for cruising. Her last years with her sister ship used as an accommodation ship in Scotland and scrapped in 1976.	
Argonaut	(1964–2003)	Argonaut was built in 1929 as the yacht Orion. She was bought and rebuilt as a cruise ship for Epirotiki. She later renamed Regina Maris and scrapped in 2003 as Regina at Aliağa.	
Jason	(1967–2005)	Jason was built in 1965 for war reparations as Aphrodite in Italy. She was later bought for Epirotiki in 1967. She remained in Epirotiki for years and later bought in 2005 for Indian Ocean Cruises as Ocean Odyssey. Scrapped in 2010 at Alang.	
Odysseus	(1967–1980)	She was built in 1936 as MV Leinster for Coast Lines. Later renamed Ulster Prince. Sold in 1967 to Epirotiki. She was broken up in 1987 at Faslane.	
Apollon II	(1968–1981)	Previously named Irish Coast for Coast Lines. She was bought by Epirotiki in 1968. In Epirotiki service she was initially named Orpheus in 1968, then Semiramis II and Achilleus in 1969, and finally Apollon XI, also rendered as Apollon 11. In 1981 she was sold to Corporacion Naviera Intercontinental de Panama S.A., and renamed Regency in 1982. She ran aground in a typhoon in 1989 and was subsequently scrapped.	
Orpheus	(1969–1997)	She was built in 1947 as MV Munster for Coast Lines. Later renamed Orpheus in 1969. Transferred in 1996 to Royal Olympic Cruises.	
Jupiter	(1970–1988)	She was built in 1962 as Moledet for Zim Lines. She was bought by Epirotiki in 1970 and renamed Jupiter. She sank in October in 1988 near Piraeus port after a collision with an Italian car ferry Adige.	
Neptune	(1971–2001)	She was built in 1955 as Meteor for Bergen Line. Later she caught fire and her remains sold to Epirotiki in 1971. Finally scrapped in 2001 at Aliaga as Neptun.	
Atlas	(1972–1986)	She was designed as cargo ship for Holland America Line. Later the ship became a cruise ship for Holland America Line as Ryndam in 1951. Later she was transferred to Europe Canada Line for floating university cruises. Later renamed Waterman, and then back to Ryndam. Sold to Epirotiki in 1972 and rebuilt as Atlas. Sold in 1986 as floating casino in Mexico. Later renamed Pride of Mississippi, Pride of Galveston and Copa Casino. The ship finally sank in 2003 when she was en route to Alang for scrap.	
Oceanos	(1976–1991)	She was built in 1953 as Jean Laborde. Later renamed Pierre Lotti for Efthymiadis Lines for Patras-Igoumenitsa-Ancona route. She later renamed as Oceanos for Epirotiki. The ship finally sank near Coffee Bay on 4 August 1991.	
Hermes	(1976–2005)	She was built in 1956 as Jugoslavia. She was bought for Epirotiki and renamed Hermes. In her final years laid-up in Piraeus port and Eleusis bay. Finally scrapped in 2012 at Aliaga.	
Pegasus	(1987–1991)	She was built as Svea Corona for Silja Line. Later the ship sold and rebuilt for Epirotiki and renamed Pegasus. Caught fire on 2 June 1991 and partially sank in Venice. Later, her remains sold to Strinzis Lines as Ionian Express and scrapped in 1995 at Aliaga.	
Odysseus	(1988–2003)	She was built in 1961 as Princessa Isabel. Later renamed Marco Polo. The ship sold to Epirotiki in 1988 as Odysseus. In 1997 passed to the subsidiary of Epirotiki to Royal Olympic Cruises in 1997. After the defunction of Royal Olympic Cruises the ship passed to Hansa Kreuzfahten. The ship eventually scrapped in 2008 at Aliaga.	
Triton	(1991–2004)	She was built in 1971 for Cunard line as Cunard Adventurer. The ship later renamed Sunward II for NCL. Later the ship renamed in 1991 as Triton for Epirotiki. Later the ship passed to Royal Olympic Cruises. Eventually the ship sold to Louis Cruises in 2004 and renamed Coral. The ship scrapped as Cora in 2013 at Alang.	
Pallas Athena	(1992–1994)	She was built in 1951 as Flandre. Renamed Carla Costa after being acquired by Costa Crociere in 1967. Sold in 1992 to Epirotiki and renamed Pallas Athena. She was destroyed by fire in 1994.	
Apollon	(1992–1995)	She was built as Wakashio Maru in 1973. Later renamed Sunflower 7. Sold to Epirotiki in 1992 and rebuilt as cruise ship. Sold to Minoan Lines in 1995 and renamed Minoan Prince. Finally renamed Golden Prince in 2002, and scrapped in 2014 at Aliaga.	
Olympic	(1993–2003)	She was built in 1956 as RMS Empress of Canada for Canadian Pacific. Later the ship was renamed Mardi Gras for Carnival Cruise Line. Sold to Epirotiki as Olympic in 1993, renamed Star of Texas in 1994 and then passed to Royal Olympic Cruises as Apollon in 1995. She was chartered to Direct Cruises as Olympic 2004 between 1995 and 1997, and then reverted to Apollon between 1997 and 2003. She was scrapped in 2003 at Alang.	
Olympic	(1995–2001)	She was built in 1956 as RMS Empress Of Britain for Canadian Pacific. Later the ship sold to Greek Line and renamed Queen Anna Maria. The ship then sold to Epirotiki and renamed Olympic. Then the ship passed to Royal Olympic Cruises. The ship in 2001 sold to Thomson Cruises and renamed Topaz. The ship then sold to Peace Boat and scrapped in 2009.	
World Renaissance	(1977–2004)	She was built as Renaissance in 1970. The ship chartered to Costa Crociere and then to Epirotiki as World Renaissance. The ship then passed to Royal Olympic Cruises. After the collapse of ROC sold and renamed Grand Victoria. Eventually the ship renamed Maestro and scrapped in 2010 at Alang.	
Stella Solaris	(1997–2003)	She was built as Cambodge in 1953. Then passed to Sun Lines and then sold to Royal Olympic Cruises. Later laid up in Eleusis bay and scrapped as S Solar in 2004 at Alang.	

== Controversies ==
Captain Yiannis Avranas and four of the crew of the Oceanos were found guilty of negligence after the ship sank in 1991, for abandoning ship without broadcasting a mayday, alerting the passengers or properly assisting in their evacuation. Despite the judgement, their behaviour was defended by the then head of Epirotiki Line and Captain Avranas continued to command a vessel until his retirement.
