= MV Jupiter (1961) =

Ship sinks in the Mediterranean

Coordinates: 37.9250°N 23.6083°E

History

Israel
- Name: Moledet
- Owner: ZIM Israel Navigation Company Ltd.
- Port of registry: Haifa
- Route: Haifa–Marseille
- Builder: Ateliers et Chantiers de Bretagne, Nantes, France
- Launched: 19 February 1961
- Identification: Call sign: 4XXN
- Fate: Sold 28 September 1970

Greece
- Name: Jupiter
- Namesake: Jupiter
- Owner: Epirotiki Line
- Acquired: 28 September 1970
- In service: 7 May 1971
- Identification: IMO number: 5239022
- Fate: Sunk in collision 21 October 1988

General characteristics (as built)
- Type: Passenger-cargo ship
- Tonnage: 7,810 GRT; 3,828 NRT; 2,104 DWT
- Length: 126.65 m (415 ft 6 in) o/a
- Beam: 19.89 m (65 ft 3 in)
- Draft: 6.45 m (21 ft 2 in)
- Propulsion: 2 × 6,390 bhp (4,765 kW) Pielstick 9-cylinder 4-stroke engines; 1 × Controllable-pitch propeller
- Speed: 17 knots (31 km/h; 20 mph)

MV Jupiter was a Greek-registered cruise ship that sank on 21 October 1988, within 40 minutes of leaving the Greek port of Piraeus. On board were 391 British schoolchildren and 84 adults on a study cruise and 110 crew. The disaster claimed the lives of one pupil, one teacher and two Greek crew members.

== The ship ==
Jupiter was originally known as Moledet ("Fatherland") and was a passenger ship registered in the port of Haifa in 1961. The 7,810 GRT vessel was built for Zim (Israel Navigation Company Ltd) and sailed regular voyages around the Mediterranean. In September 1970, Moledet was sold to Epirotiki Line, a Greek shipping company, and renamed Jupiter.

Earlier on the same day that the sinking occurred, Epirotiki had announced an agreement to sell the Jupiter to an American investment firm, which intended to relocate it to Gulfport, Mississippi, in the United States, and convert it into a gambling ship traveling to international waters called the Pride of Mississippi. After the sinking, the SS Ryndam was purchased for this purpose instead.

== Sinking of the Jupiter ==
On 21 October 1988, 391 schoolchildren aged 13 to 16 and their teachers boarded Jupiter at the Greek port of Piraeus at the start of a week-long educational cruise around the Mediterranean.

Just 15 minutes after leaving port, the Jupiter was struck by an Italian freight ship, the Adige, that was entering port. The collision tore a 4.5-metre (15 ft) by 12-metre (39 ft) hole in Jupiter's port side. Within 40 minutes (at 6:55 p.m.), the ship had sunk vertically and stern first in 82 metres (269 ft) of water.

The lives of two passengers (a pupil and a teacher from the West Midlands) and two Greek crew members were lost. Around 70 people sustained injuries. The teacher, Bernard Butt, reportedly died saving the lives of around 50 of the pupils.

== Aftermath ==
In the immediate aftermath of the incident, the captain of the Italian ship was detained and Greek and Italian authorities each blamed the other party. The subsequent court cases lasted almost eight years.

The ship remained where she sank, 1.2 nautical miles (2.2 km) from the port entrance at Piraeus. A significant oil leakage occurred in 1999, possibly following disturbance of the seabed by an earthquake, and was removed in a 43-day operation to protect the local marine environment.

An Institute of Psychiatry report in 1999 focused on the experiences of the children and formed one of the largest studies of adolescent survivors of disasters when it was published.

The impact on the young people was also recorded in a book called Jupiter's Children, compiled by former schoolteacher and Jupiter survivor Mary Campion and published in 1998. Given the gravity of the incident, it was considered remarkable that all but one schoolchild survived, but in an interview in The Independent, Mary Campion suggested that their behaviour may have been a contributory factor: "Schoolchildren are accustomed to obeying orders and those aboard did so without argument. They are used to being in a crowd, being controlled by adults, without questioning at the time, and to moving frequently in a school day in large numbers without pushing, jostling or hurting each other."

Writing in the newsletter of the group Disaster Action in 2010, Campion said that although the case had set a number of legal precedents in UK law and had changed safety regulations for passengers on ships, many of the survivors were suffering from post-traumatic stress disorder in the aftermath and did not receive the treatment they needed. She added that a Facebook page for Jupiter Survivors established in 2009 had revealed that many people were still adversely affected two decades on.

== Trivia ==
- The MV Adige was still in service as a car carrier until she was scrapped in 2001.
