= Baldassare Calamai =

Italian painter (1797–1851)

Baldassare Calamai (November 13, 1797 – July 11, 1851) was an Italian painter, active in a neoclassical style, painting mainly historical subjects.

== Biography ==
Calamai was born in Florence.

He was a pupil of Pietro Benvenuti in Florence. Saltini, who likely knew the artist, bemoans his failure to achieve greatness, stating:

. . . he could not or would not join in the tireless study without which the most precious gifts of Providence suffer, as with the unhappy fate of the butterfly in the hands of the child. Devoted to gambling, to play, to debauchery, he neglected every beautiful discipline of the mind, and dispersed the intellect during his early life.

Among his works were:

- Galileo visited by Milton
- Dante, Virgil, and Farinata degli Uberti (1825)
- Episode during Plague of 1348 in Florence' (1828, second version 1836)
- Ruggiero opens the Tower of Hunger to discover corpses of Ugolino and his sons, (from Dante's Inferno, 1838).

In 1835 he painted illustrations of Dante's Divine Comedy.
