= Coffee Bay =

Coffee Bay Koffiebaai
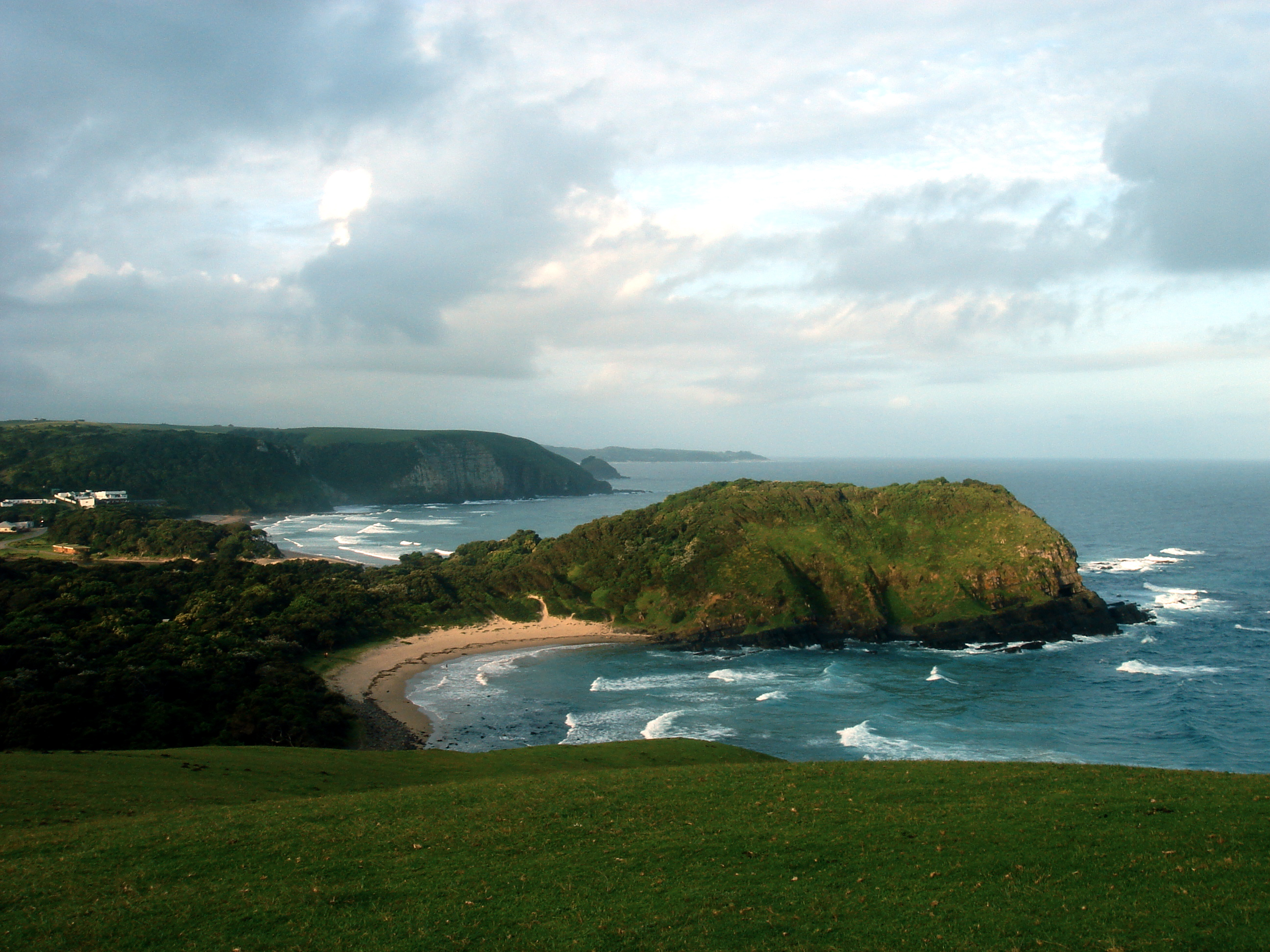
- Coffee Bay

- Location within Eastern Cape Location within South Africa Location within Africa
- Coordinates: 31°59′10″S 29°08′50″E
- Country: South Africa
- Province: Eastern Cape
- District: O.R. Tambo
- Municipality: King Sabata Dalindyebo

Area
  - Total: 0.64 km^{2} (0.25 sq mi)

Population (2011)
  - Total: 258
  - Density: 400/km^{2} (1,000/sq mi)

Racial makeup (2011)
  - Black African: 73.0%
  - Coloured: 3.5%
  - White: 20.8%
  - Other: 2.7%

First languages (2011)
  - Xhosa: 65.5%
  - English: 22.9%
  - Afrikaans: 7.4%
  - Other: 4.3%
- Time zone: UTC+2 (SAST)
- PO box: 5082
- Area code: 047
- Website: www.coffeebay.co.za

Coffee Bay (Afrikaans: Koffiebaai) is a town on the Wild Coast of the Eastern Cape Province of South Africa. It is located about 250 kilometres south-west of the city of Durban and has a population of 258 people.

The town is named after the hundreds of coffee trees which grew from beans either scattered by a shipwreck or by plunderers. A holiday resort in Tembuland is located 80 km south-east of Viedgesville. It can be reached via a turn-off from the N2 highway.

The Mthatha River's mouth is near Coffee Bay.

== History ==
One of the arguments is that the town was named Coffee Bay in 1893 after a shipwreck lost its cargo of coffee beans near the coast of Coffee Bay, although there may no longer be any coffee trees or beans in the Coffee Bay area. The municipality is located in an area that was previously part of the Xhosa bantustan, Transkei, and the population is still predominantly Xhosa.

== Oceanos Sinking ==
On the 4th of August 1991, the MTS Oceanos sank off the coast of East London, South Africa. After the South African Air Force participated in the rescue effort, all 571 Passengers were able to escape the sinking vessel just mere minutes before the plunge.

== Geography ==
Coffee Bay is a small village situated on the South African "Wild Coast" which stretches for 160 kilometres South from the Kei River mouth to Port Edward in the North and approximately 100 kilometres inland. The nearest large town, Mthatha, is approximately 80 kilometres away. Coffee Bay falls within the King Sabata Dalindyebo (KSD) district of the O.R Tambo District Municipality. The area is filled with diverse wild flora and fauna.

== Infrastructure ==
The community is largely rural and Coffee Bay's infrastructure includes informal settlements, a trading store, a plain camping site and two resort hotels.

== Community ==
The traditional Xhosa lifestyle in Coffee Bay is one of the aspects that draw tourists to the area. At the same time, the Eastern Cape Department of Social Development identified challenges that include high unemployment rates, malnutrition, housing shortages, infrastructure backlogs, low levels of health facilities, low levels of education, HIV and environmental degradation. The communities’ lives are dominated by poverty and ill-health, and most of the population do not comply with the environmental legislation regarding the use of natural resources. A study has suggested that the high illiteracy and unemployment compels people to use coastal natural resources to satisfy their basic needs.

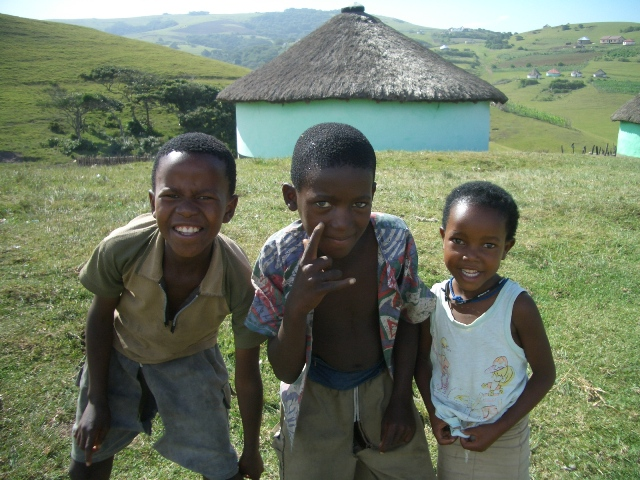
Children in the village of Coffee Bay

=== Folklore ===
Hole in the Wall, in Coffee Bay, is a large hole which is scored neatly into a cliff that extends over the sea. The hole amplifies the sound of the waves onto the rock, inspiring the local Xhosa people to name it esiKhaleni which means ‘place of sound’. There are many different folklore tales about the Hole in the Wall. Many believe that the hole is a gateway to ancestors. People also believe that the Mpako River once formed a landlocked lagoon blocked by the cliff. Most accept the scientific explanation that the hole is the result of many years of waves breaking against the cliff.

== See also ==
- Mpofu Nature Reserve
- Augrabies Falls
