= Piero Calamai =

Italian admiral

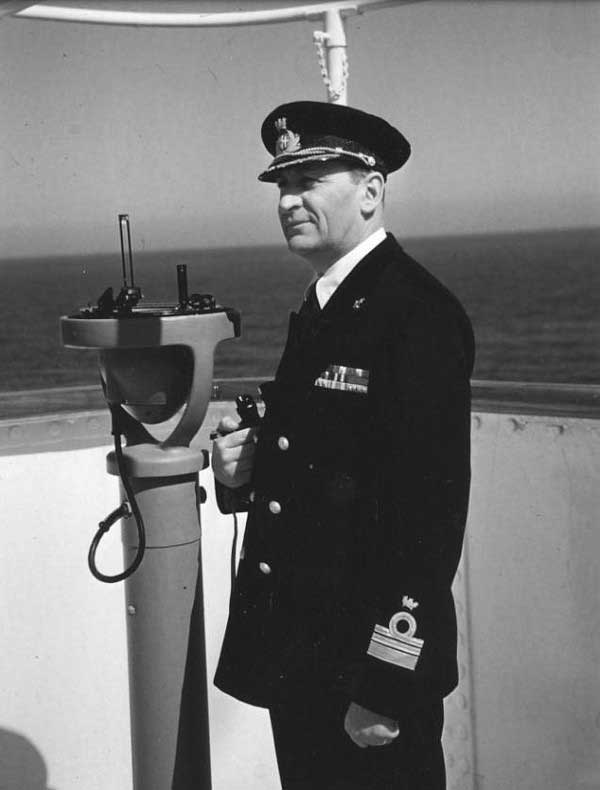
- Born: December 25, 1897; Genoa, Kingdom of Italy
- Died: April 7, 1972 (aged 74); Genoa, Italy
- Occupations: Sea captain
- Military career
- Allegiance: Italy
- Branch: Regia Marina
- Rank: Lieutenant commander
- Conflicts: World War I World War II

Piero Calamai (25 December 1897 – 7 April 1972) was the Italian captain of the SS Andrea Doria when it sank in July 1956 after colliding with the MS Stockholm.

== Life and career ==
Calamai was born into a naval family. His younger brother Marco advanced to the rank of rear admiral in the Italian Navy and also had command of the Italian Naval Academy before being lost at sea in 1957. His father Orestes founded the first naval magazine in Italy, entitled La Marina Mercantile (Merchant Navy).

Calamai began his career as a sailor in July 1916, serving as an ensign in the Royal Italian Navy. Decorated with the Silver Medal of Military Valor during World War I for bravery, he also took part in World War II with the rank of lieutenant commander of complement, earning a second Silver Medal of Military Valor.

Following World War II, he started working with the private company Italian Line; he attained the rank of officer and eventually commanded 27 ships. He was assigned to the flagship SS Andrea Doria. After the sinking of the Andrea Doria, Calamai retired and even told one of his friends, "Before I used to love the sea. Now I hate it." He died on April 7, 1972, at the age of 74, in his hometown.
