= Apollon XI =

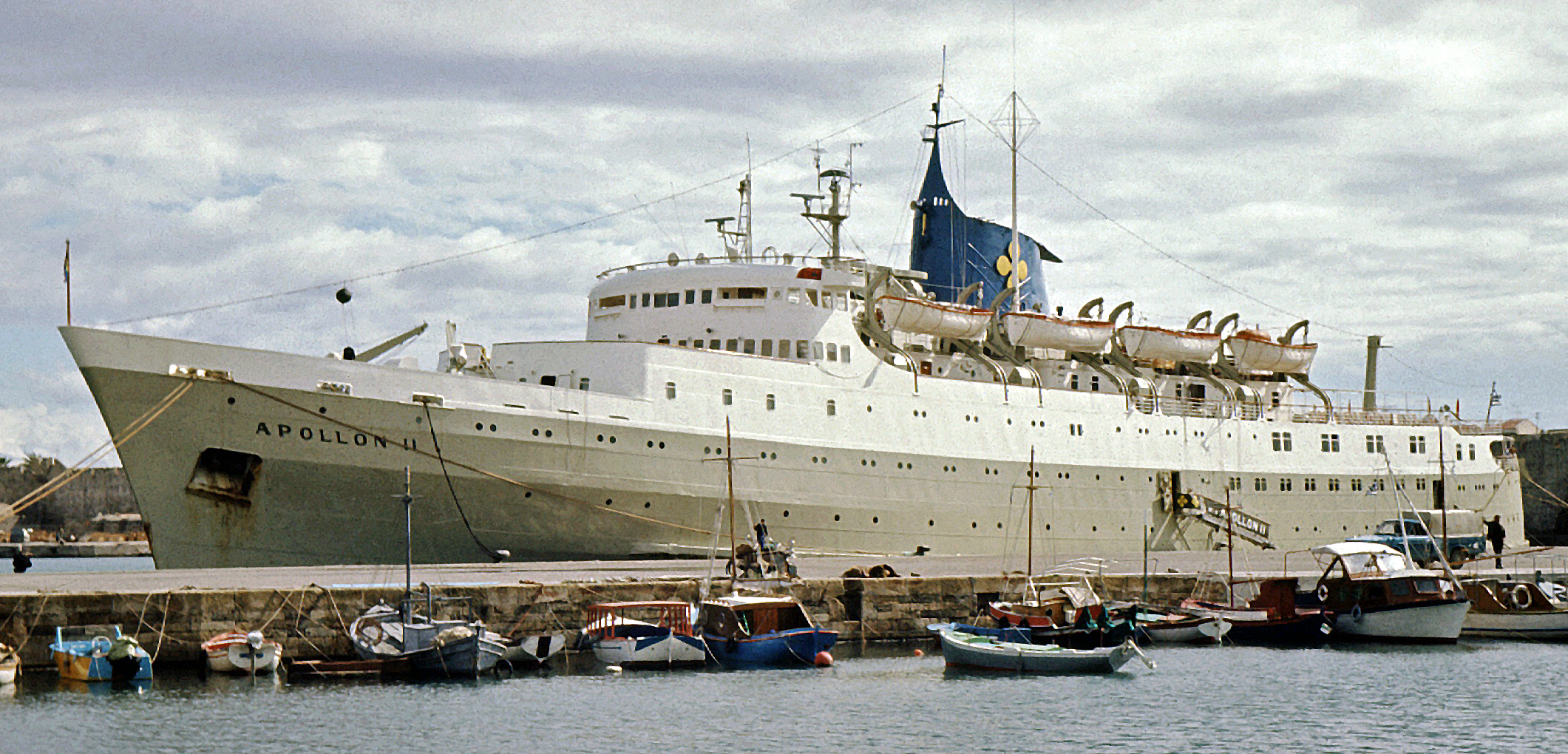
- Cruise-ship Apollon II at the port of Rhodos, 1972

History
- Owner: 1952: Coast Lines Ltd, Glasgow, Scotland; 1968: Epirotiki Lines; 1981: Corporacion Naviera Intercontinental de Panama S.A.
- Builder: Harland & Wolff, Belfast, Northern Ireland
- Launched: 8 May 1952
- Completed: 16 October 1952
- Out of service: 11 October 1989
- Identification: IMO number: 5163120
- Fate: Ran aground in Batangas, was demolished in Manila

General characteristics
- Tonnage: 3,813 GRT
- Length: 103.54 m (339.7 ft)
- Beam: 15.73 m (51.6 ft)
- Depth: 4.81 m (15.78 ft)
- Speed: 16 knots
- Capacity: 1,200 passengers (as Irish Coast), 350 passengers (as Apollon XI)

Apollon XI was an Epirotiki Lines cruise ship, which was named after both the Greek sun god Apollo and the Apollo 11 mission that landed the first humans on the Moon.

Initially it was built as a passenger ship under the name Irish Coast for Coast Lines Ltd, Glasgow. She was chartered by Burns & Laird Lines Ltd. for the service between Belfast and Liverpool, also from Cork to Fishguard, Dublin to Liverpool and for the service Glasgow – Dublin – Liverpool.

In 1968 she was acquired by Epirotiki and changed several names (Orpheus in 1968, then Semiramis II and Achilleus in 1969) until she took the final name Apollon XI (or Apollon 11) and was rebuilt as a cruise ship. She was used for cruises in the Aegean Sea, in the Mediterranean Sea, in the Antilles (Caribbean Sea) and in Africa. In 1982 she was renamed to Regency. On 11 October 1989, she ran aground due to the typhoon Dan and was subsequently towed to Manila (Philippines) for demolition.
