= MS Svea Corona =

Ferry and cruise ship built in 1975

- MS Pegasus

History
- Name: 1975–1984: Svea Corona; 1984: Sundancer; 1984–1994: Pegasus; 1994–1995: Ionian Express
- Owner: 1975–1981: Rederi AB Svea; 1981–1984: Johnson Line; 1984: Sundance Cruises; 1984: Epirotiki Line; 1984–1994: Cosmos Cruises Maritime; 1994–1995: Strintzis Line
- Operator: 1975–1981: Rederi AB Svea (Silja Line traffic); 1981–1984: Johnson Line (Silja Line traffic); 1984: Sundance Cruises; 1984–1985: Laid up/rebuilt; 1985–1986: Epirotiki Line; 1986: V.T.C.; 1986–1987: Laid up; 1987–1991: Epirotiki Line; 1991–1995: Laid up/rebuilt
- Port of registry: 1975–1984: Stockholm, Sweden; 1984: Nassau, Bahamas; 1984–1995: Piraeus, Greece
- Ordered: 4 June 1973
- Builder: Dubegion-Normandie, Nantes, France
- Yard number: 141
- Laid down: 18 February 1974
- Launched: 19 July 1974
- Christened: 23 May 1975 by Mrs Elsa Högberg
- Acquired: 19 May 1975
- Maiden voyage: 25 May 1975
- In service: 25 May 1975
- Out of service: 2 June 1991
- Identification: IMO number: 7360174
- Fate: Scrapped in Aliağa 1995

General characteristics (as Svea Corona)
- Type: Cruiseferry
- Tonnage: 12,573 GRT; 1,746 DWT
- Length: 153.12 m (502.36 ft)
- Beam: 22.33 m (73.26 ft)
- Depth: 5.80 m (19.03 ft)
- Ice class: 1 A
- Installed power: 4 × S.E.M.T-Pielstick 12PC2-2V-400; 17,904 kW (combined)
- Propulsion: Two controllable pitch propellers; Two bow thrusters
- Speed: 22 knots (41 km/h; 25 mph)
- Capacity: 1,200 passengers; 799 berths; 240 cars; 400 lane meters

General characteristics (as Sundancer)
- Class & type: Cruiseferry
- Capacity: 700 passengers; 150 cars

General characteristics (as Pegasus)
- Class & type: Cruise ship
- Capacity: 810 passengers

MS Svea Corona was a car-passenger ferry built in 1975 by Dubegion-Normandie S.A., Nantes, France for Rederi AB Svea, Sweden for Silja Line traffic. She was later rebuilt as a cruiseship and known under names MS Sundancer and MS Pegasus. She was scrapped in 1995 in Aliağa, Turkey.

== History ==
=== 1975–1984 ===
MS Svea Corona was the first of the so-called "second generation French sisters" to be built for Silja Line traffic. The first generation French sisters, MS Aallotar and MS Svea Regina were delivered in 1972 and started year-round ferry traffic between Helsinki, the capital of Finland and Stockholm, the capital of Sweden. After just three years, three new ships of similar but larger construction replaced the first generation ships. The new ships were the Svea Corona and her sisters MS Wellamo and MS Bore Star. These ships started a new era in Baltic Sea ferry traffic, being larger than any previous ferries to have sailed in those waters.

On 24 May 1975, the Svea Corona started service for the Silja Line. She damaged her bow thruster during the maiden voyage, and it was not repaired until 10 June of the same year during an extra docking at Vuosaaren telakka, Helsinki. With all three ships in operation, there wasn't enough passenger traffic on the route to support three ships through the entire year. As an initial solution, the Bore Star was chartered to Finnlines for winter seasons 1975-76 and 1976-77 while Svea Corona and Wellamo served the route as a two-ship operation. During the summer seasons, an unusual schedule allowing two daily departures from each port with three ships was adopted instead of the route's normal one daily departure per port arrangement. On 14 April 1977 there was a bomb threat on board the Svea Corona, but it turned out to be false.

After September 1977, the Svea Corona served on the Turku–Mariehamn–Stockholm route during the winter season (between September and May) and spent the summer months as a third ship on the Helsinki–Stockholm service. The arrangement lasted until 1981 when larger tonnage was delivered to the Helsinki–Stockholm route, and Svea Corona alongside her sister Bore Star (which had been renamed Silja Star the previous year after a change of ownership) transferred permanently to the Turku–Stockholm service. In 1978, Rederi AB Svea signed a memorandum of agreement to sell Svea Corona to DFDS on delivery of the new Helsinki–Stockholm ship, but this agreement was not exercised and DFDS acquired Effoa's Wellamo instead. On 24 November 1981, Johnson Line purchased Rederi AB Svea, owner of Svea Corona. As a result, the ship lost her original white/black funnel colours and gained Johnson Line's blue/yellow colours.

=== 1984–1995 ===
In February 1984 Svea Corona ceased service with Silja Line, and was sold to Sundance Cruises, a company owned by Effoa, Johnson Line and McDonald Enterprises. She was rebuilt at Oskarshamns Varv, Sweden as MS Sundancer for cruising on the west coast of North America. However, on what was just her third cruise as the Sundancer, The ship hit a rock on her starboard side on Maud island while trying to turn to starboard to enter Seymour Narrows. She entered Menzies Bay to try to run aground but decided to try to run south in Discovery passage to the Elk Falls Mill to try and come alongside the paper dock. The M/V Seymour Crown, a Tug based at the mill was called out and managed to reverse the starboard list to a port list against the dock and mill employees managed to remove all on board with no loss of life.

In August 1984 the Sundancer was refloated and towed into Burrard Shipyard, Vancouver, where she was examined and declared a constructive total loss. The ship was left laid up at the shipyard, awaiting potential buyers. In November 1984 she was sold to the Greece-based Epirotiki Line, and during December 1984 the ship was towed to Piraeus, Greece, where she was restored during the year 1985 as the cruise ship MS Pegasus. During early 1986 she was chartered to V.T.C. for cruising on the east coast of South America. Between May and September of the same year she returned to Vancouver, where she was laid up as a hotel ship. After the charter she was used by Epirotiki Lines on cruises on the Mediterranean and between 1989 and 1990 also on the Caribbean.

On June 2, 1991, a fire broke out onboard while the ship was in Venice, preparing to depart on a product exhibition cruise for Bosch. She partially sank in the shallow waters, and was declared a total constructive loss for the second time. In August of the same year she was towed to Piraeus where she was laid up for the next three years awaiting buyers. Finally in 1994 a buyer emerged. The Greece-based Strintzis Lines purchased the ship and renamed her Ionian Express, with intention to rebuild her as a car-passenger ferry for their Swansea Cork Ferries (although officially renamed Ionian Express, this name was never painted on her hull). A fire broke out in her engine room during the rebuilding at Perama, Greece, and for a third time the ship was declared a total constructive loss. No further buyers were found to restore the ill-fated ship, and she was towed to the scrapyard in Aliağa, Turkey, on 29 March 1995, and was subsequently broken up. Her engines were sold to Med Link Line and installed on their M/S Agios Andreas.

== Facilities ==
Interior features of the Svea Corona (and her sisters) included a sauna and swimming pool, several restaurants, conference facilities for 140 people, a night club, movie theatre and a children's playroom.
