= SS Cephalonia =

Former British passenger ship (1882–1904)

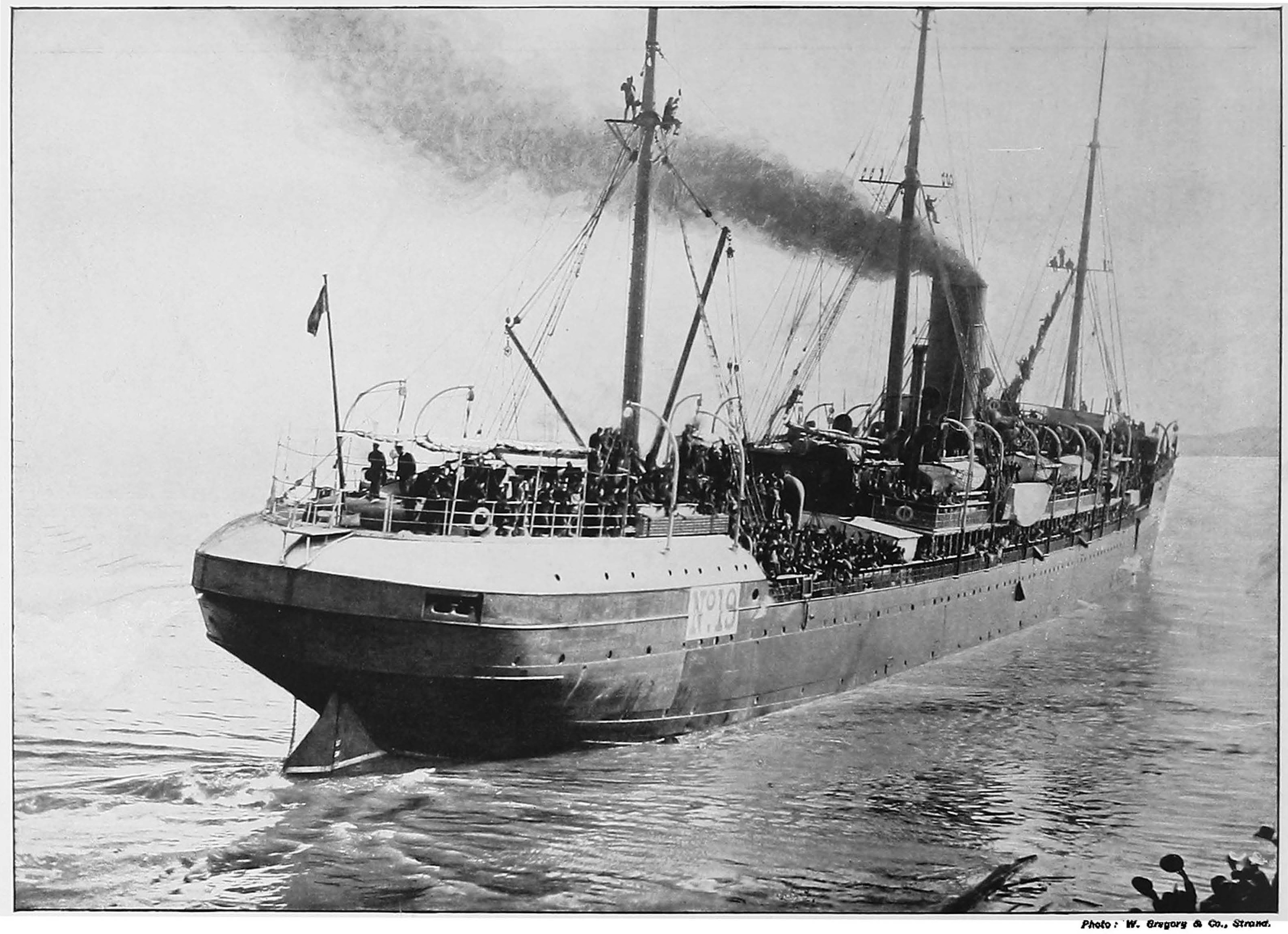
- SS Cephalonia between 1887 and 1889

History

United Kingdom
- Name: (United Kingdom) Cephalonia (1882–1900); (Qing dynasty) Hailor (1900); (Russian Empire) Hailor (1900–1904)
- Namesake: Cephalonia
- Owner: Cunard Line (1882–1900); Chinese Eastern Railway (1900); Imperial Russian Navy (1900–1904)
- Port of registry: Liverpool, United Kingdom; Saint Petersburg/Novorossiysk, Russian Empire
- Route: Liverpool - Queenstown – Boston (1882–1899)
- Builder: Laird Brothers
- Yard number: 498
- Laid down: 21 May 1881
- Launched: 20 May 1882
- Completed: 12 August 1882
- Maiden voyage: 23 August 1882
- Out of service: 9 March 1904
- Fate: Scuttled 9 March 1904

General characteristics
- Type: Passenger ship
- Tonnage: 5,517 GRT
- Length: 131.2 m (430 ft 5 in)
- Beam: 14.2 m (46 ft 7 in)
- Depth: 10.5 m (34 ft 5 in)
- Installed power: Double cylinder compound steam engine
- Propulsion: Screw propeller
- Sail plan: 3 masts and a single funnel
- Speed: 14 knots (26 km/h; 16 mph)
- Capacity: 200 first class and 1,500 steerage passengers
- Notes: Sister ship of Catalonia and Pavonia

SS Cephalonia was a British passenger ship of the Cunard Line that was ultimately sold to the Imperial Russian Navy which scuttled her as a blockship at Port Arthur during the Russo-Japanese War on 9 March 1904.

== Construction ==
Cephalonia was laid down on 21 May 1881 at the Laird Brothers shipyard in Birkenhead, United Kingdom for the Cunard Line. She was launched on 20 May 1882 and completed on 12 August 1882. She was named Cephalonia and was a sister ship of Catalonia and Pavonia. The ship was 131.2 metres (430 ft 5 in) long, with a beam of 14.2 metres (46 ft 7 in) and a depth of 10.5 metres (34 ft 5 in). The ship was assessed at 5,517 GRT and had a double cylinder compound steam engine driving a single screw propeller producing 700 horsepower (520 kW). The ship could reach a maximum speed of 14 knots (26 km/h; 16 mph) and possessed three masts and one funnel. As built, she had the capacity to carry 200 first class passengers and 1,500 steerage passengers. She was the first Cunarder to be fitted with refrigeration chambers and was also the largest merchant vessel built on the Mersey at the time.

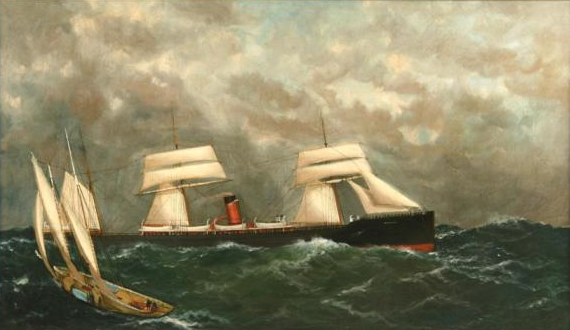
Painting of Cephalonia dating from 1888

== Career ==
Cephalonia departed on her maiden voyage on 23 August 1882 from Liverpool to Queenstown and Boston without issues. During her career, the ship would also hold occasional stops at New York and Baltimore. On 23 January 1886, while Cephalonia was on her homebound voyage from Boston to Liverpool, she lost her propeller about 650 nautical miles (1,200 km; 750 mi) west of the Fastnet Rock, leaving her dead in the water. That same day SS Egypt of the National Line came across the stricken vessel and offered assistance after the captain of Cephalonia informed the captain of Egypt about their unfortunate situation. However, the captain of Cephalonia declined this offer of assistance and instead requested that Egypt inform any eastbound steamship of the damage that Cephalonia had sustained. After two days, on 25 January 1886, Egypt encountered an eastbound steamer and informed them of what had happened to Cephalonia and their position. The ship reached Cephalonia and proceeded to tow her all the way to Queenstown by 30 January 1886, where the ship was repaired and returned to service.

Cephalonia would complete her final voyage as a passenger ship on 12 September 1899, as the Boer War had broken out and the British Admiralty commissioned her in October 1899 to serve as a troop transport during the conflict. She fulfilled this role until the ship was sold to the Chinese Eastern Railway in 1900, where she was renamed Hailor.

== Last years and loss ==
Hailor was sold to the Imperial Russian Navy in 1900 and stationed in Port Arthur. She was still stationed there when the Russo-Japanese War broke out following a Japanese attack on Port Arthur on 8–9 February 1904. The Imperial Russian Navy decided to scuttle Hailor alongside another steamer named Harbin on 9 March 1904 at the entrance to the harbor at Port Arthur, in order to use them as blockships to keep out the Imperial Japanese Navy.
