= Herbert Haddock =

British merchant captain and naval officer (1861–1946)

Captain Herbert Haddock CB RD RNR
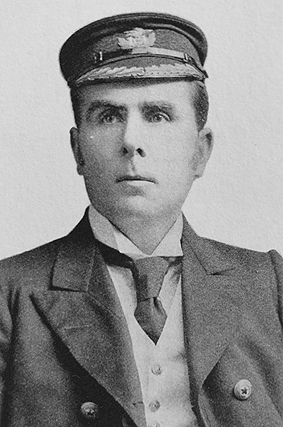
- Haddock early in his career
- Born: 27 January 1861; Rugby, Warwickshire, England
- Died: 4 October 1946 (aged 85); Southampton, Hampshire, England
- Resting place: St. Mary Extra Cemetery, Southampton, England
- Occupations: Sea captain; Naval officer
- Known for: Captain of RMS Olympic at the time of the sinking of the Titanic
- Spouse: Mabel Eliza Bouchette (m. 1893; died 1935)
- Children: 4
- Military career
- Allegiance: United Kingdom
- Branch: Royal Naval Reserve
- Rank: Captain
- Conflicts: World War I
- Awards: Reserve Decoration

Captain Herbert James Haddock CB RD RNR (27 January 1861 – 4 October 1946) was a British merchant sea captain and naval officer. He is best known as the captain of the RMS Olympic at the time of the sinking of the Titanic as well as being the first captain of the Titanic, overseeing the ship at Belfast while her delivery-trip crew was assembling there from 25 to 31 March 1912.

== Early life ==
Haddock was born to Herbert James Haddock (born 1825) in Rugby, Warwickshire on 27 January 1861. He joined the Royal Navy, serving as a lieutenant aboard HMS Edinburgh. In 1902, Haddock was appointed a Companion of the Order of the Bath. He was later the Royal Naval Reserve aide de camp to King George V.

== White Star Line ==
After his Royal naval service, Haddock joined the White Star Line, where he captained a number of liners including the SS Britannic, SS Germanic, RMS Cedric, and RMS Oceanic.

Haddock was also nominally the first commander of RMS Titanic. He signed on as her master at Southampton on 25 March 1912, and then travelled to Belfast to oversee the crew that was assembling there for the ship's delivery trip to Southampton. He was relieved by Edward J. Smith at Belfast on 31 March and then returned to Southampton to take command of Smith's previous ship, RMS Olympic. On 3 April he began Olympic's tenth Southampton-New York-Southampton roundtrip, arriving in New York on 10 April, the day Titanic left Southampton. Olympic was given the radio call sign MKC.

At the time of Titanic's sinking Haddock was sailing Olympic easterly from New York to Southampton, approximately 500 nautical miles (930 km; 580 mi) west by south of Titanic's location. Haddock was informed of the disaster by wireless operator Ernest James Moore at 2250 ET on 14 April. After receiving a CQD call from Titanic, Haddock calculated a new course and headed directly to her. He also sent for an engineer to set the ship's engines to full power. When 100 nautical miles (190 km; 120 mi) from Titanic, at approximately 1600 ET on 15 April, Haddock received a message from Captain Rostron of RMS Carpathia, explaining that continuing on course to Titanic would gain nothing, as "All boats accounted for. About 675 souls saved [...] Titanic foundered about 2.20 am." Rostron requested that the message be forwarded to White Star and Cunard. He said that he was returning to harbour in New York, and recommended that other ships do the same. Subsequently, the wireless room aboard the Olympic operated as a clearing room for radio messages.

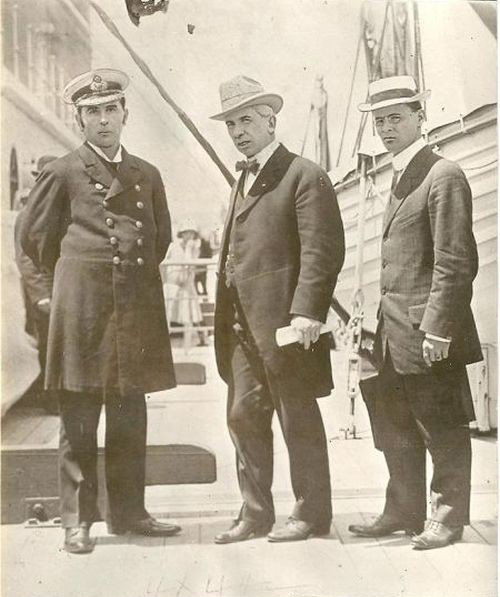
Haddock (far left) with Senator William Alden Smith (centre), aboard the RMS Olympic in May 1912

In the United States Senate inquiry into the sinking of the Titanic, Haddock was interviewed by William Alden Smith on 25 May 1912. Haddock gave his residence as Southampton, and his employment as a "Master Mariner". Seven weeks after the Titanic disaster, Haddock, steaming at night, almost ran the Olympic aground on rocks near Land's End. Fortunately lookouts spotted waves breaking at the base of the rocks in time and another disaster was averted. The error was attributed to faulty navigation, and Haddock was under strict observation for his next few voyages. On 9 October 1912 White Star withdrew Olympic from service and returned her to her builders at Belfast to have modifications added to incorporate lessons learned from the Titanic disaster six months prior, and improve safety. This refit lasted until mid 1913 and while Olympic was laid up Haddock commanded other White Star ships.

=== World War I ===
With the start of the First World War, in October 1914, Haddock was back in command of Olympic during her attempt to assist the battleship HMS Audacious after she had collided with a German mine off the western coast of Scotland. Olympic was subsequently laid up until being converted to a troopship at the outbreak of World War I. Haddock was redeployed to command a dummy fleet of wooden dreadnoughts and battle cruisers, and was stationed in Belfast. In 1915, Harold Sanderson, head of International Mercantile Marine, tried to reassign Haddock to captain Britannic when she was converted to a hospital ship. However, the Admiralty refused to release Haddock from his assignment in Belfast and by 1916 Haddock had resigned from the White Star Line. From 5 to 14 May 1917, Haddock sailed from Liverpool to New York City as a passenger aboard the SS Saint Paul, six months before she was taken over for wartime service. The voyage's manifest shows that Haddock's trip was funded by the Admiralty, and states that his final destination was Newport News, Virginia, where he would be received by the British Navy. According to the 1917 ship's manifest, Haddock had not been back to the United States since 1914. Later that year he made a second trip to the United States arriving in New York on 31 August 1917 as a passenger aboard the White Star liner RMS Adriatic with his occupation listed on the manifest as "naval officer" and a final destination of Norfolk, Virginia. His passage on this trip was paid for by his former employer, the White Star Line. The purpose of these two trips is unknown.

=== Post War ===
After the armistice that ended World War I, Haddock continued to serve as Royal Naval Reserve aide-de-camp to King George V until he was succeeded in that role by White Star commander Charles A. Bartlett on 16 July 1919. On 8 December 1919, Capt. Herbert J. Haddock was placed on the Royal Naval Reserve's retired list. It is not thought that Haddock who would have reached the age of 60, the mandatory retirement age for White Star officers, in 1921 returned to the White Star Line after the war.

== Personal life ==
Haddock married Mabel Eliza Bouchette, in Rock Ferry, Lancashire, on 13 May 1893. Bouchette was born in Liverpool in c. 1872 and lived with her father, Francis, at 91 Townsend Lane, West Derby, Liverpool. Other sources state that Bouchette was from Quebec.

Haddock and Bouchette had four children: Geoffrey (10 January 1895 – 17 September 1916), Ruth (1896 – 26 October 1958), and twins Herbert (21 October 1903 – 1988) and Joan (21 October 1903 – 21 November 1920). Geoffrey was a Lieutenant in the Victoria Rifles of Canada. He was killed in action on 27 September 1916 at the age of 21, and was commemorated on the Canadian National Vimy Memorial. In the 28 May 1935 edition of the London Gazette, Ruth was described as a spinster. UK censuses and civil registers show that the family lived in Rock Ferry until at least 1904. They later moved to Southampton, living in the suburb of Bitterne. Bouchette died on 11 March 1935.

A 1911 story in The New York Times described Haddock as the "only skipper in the Atlantic trade who wears the mid-Victorian mutton chop whiskers without a beard or mustache".

Haddock died in Southampton on 4 October 1946 at the age of 85.
