= British Wreck Commissioner's inquiry into the sinking of the Titanic =

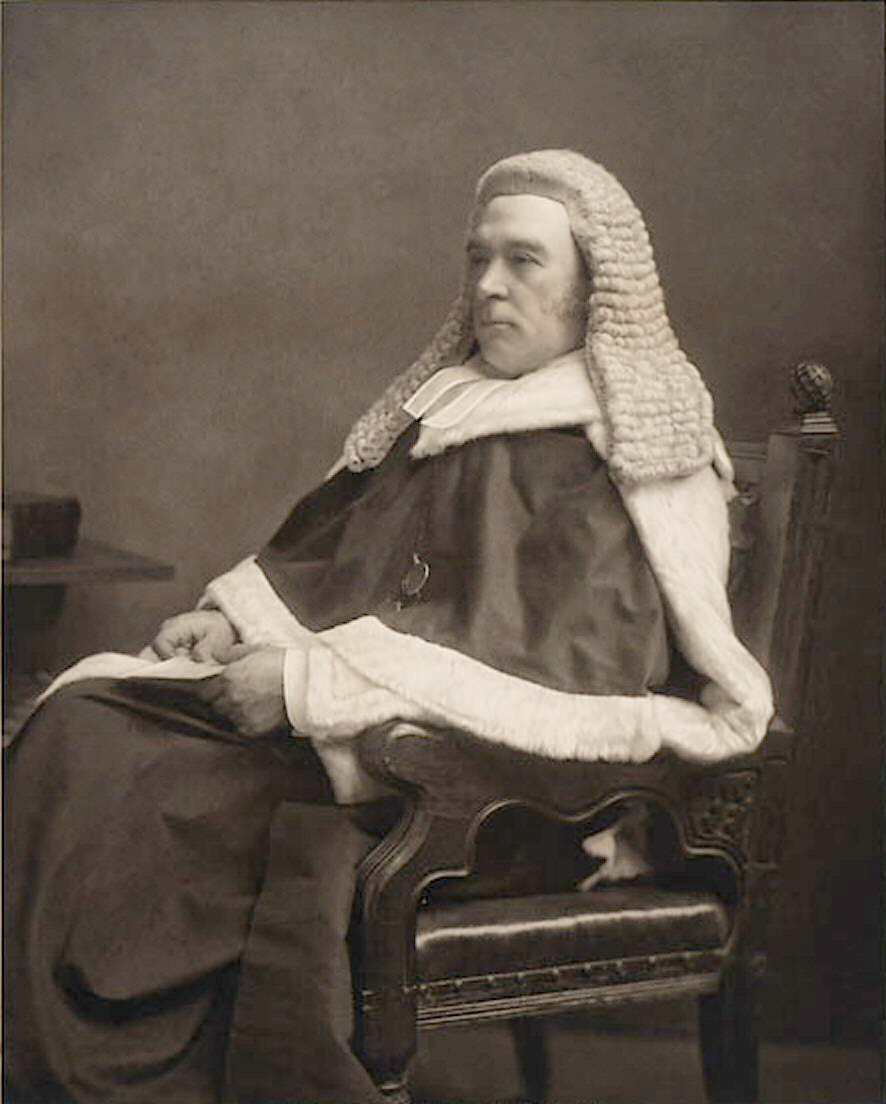
Lord Mersey presided over the inquiry

The sinking of the RMS Titanic on 15 April 1912 resulted in an inquiry by the British Wreck Commissioner on behalf of the British Board of Trade. The inquiry was overseen by High Court judge John Bigham, 1st Viscount Mersey, and was held in London from 2 May to 3 July 1912. The hearings took place mainly at the London Scottish Drill Hall, at 59 Buckingham Gate, London SW1.

There were a total of 42 days of official investigation. Lord Mersey and the various counsels, assessors and experts in marine law and shipping architecture, questioned White Star Line officials, government officials, surviving passengers and crew, and those who had aided the rescue efforts. Organisations represented by legal counsels included shipping unions and government organisations. Nearly 100 witnesses testified, answering more than 25,000 questions. The questioning resulted in a report that contained a detailed description of the ship, an account of the ship's journey, a description of the damage caused by the iceberg, and an account of the evacuation and rescue.

The final report was published on 30 July 1912. Its recommendations, along with those of the earlier United States Senate inquiry that had taken place in the month after the sinking, led to changes in safety practices following the disaster.

== Background ==
The sinking of the RMS Titanic, a trans-Atlantic passenger liner operated by White Star Line, occurred in the early hours of 15 April 1912 while the ship was on its maiden voyage from Southampton, UK, to New York, United States. The sinking was caused by a collision with an iceberg in the North Atlantic some 700 nautical miles east of Halifax, Nova Scotia. Over 1500 passengers and crew died, with some 710 survivors in Titanic's lifeboats rescued by RMS Carpathia a few hours later. There was initially some confusion in both the United States and the UK over the extent of the disaster, with some newspapers at first reporting that the ship and the passengers and crew were safe. By the time Carpathia reached New York, it had become clear that Titanic, reputed to be unsinkable, had sunk and many had died. Official inquiries were set up in both countries to investigate the circumstances of the disaster.

== Formation ==
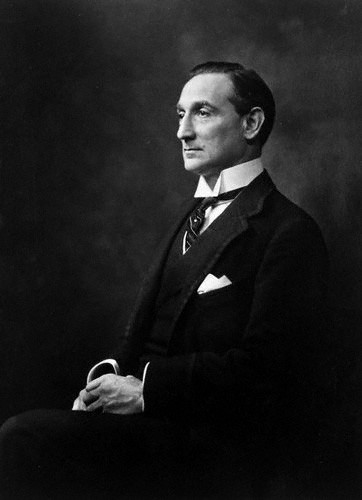
The Attorney General, Sir Rufus Isaacs, presented the inquiry with a list of 26 key questions to be answered

When news of the disaster reached the UK government the responsibility for initiating an inquiry lay with the Board of Trade, the organisation responsible for British maritime regulations and whose inspectors had certified Titanic as seaworthy before her maiden voyage. On 22 April 1912, Sydney Buxton, President of the Board of Trade, asked Lord Loreburn, the Lord Chancellor, to set up a commission of inquiry. The Lord Chancellor appointed Lord Mersey as the inquiry's president.

The resultant hearings took place from 2 May to 3 July 1912, mainly at the London Scottish Drill Hall, on Buckingham Gate. The location was chosen for its large size, as sizeable audiences were expected, but turned out to have terrible acoustics that made it hard to hear what was going on. The last two days were held at Caxton Hall, Westminster due to the Scottish Drill Hall being booked for an examination. To assist the inquiry, Titanic's builders Harland & Wolff provided a 20 feet (6.1 m) half-model of the ship showing its starboard side, next to which was mounted a large map showing the North Atlantic shipping lanes and locations of sea ice.

The Attorney General for England and Wales, Sir Rufus Isaacs, gave the commission a list of 26 questions concerning issues such as Titanic's construction, how she had been navigated and the ice warnings received prior to the collision with the iceberg. A further question was added after the inquiry began concerning the role played by SS Californian, which had been in the vicinity of Titanic but had not rendered assistance to the sinking ship.

== Legal personnel ==
Those carrying out the questioning and representation included legal counsels, and assessors and experts in marine law and shipping architecture. The five assessors were Rear Admiral Somerset Gough-Calthorpe; Captain A. W. Clarke of Trinity House; Commander Fitzroy Lyon of the Royal Naval Reserve; Professor John Harvard Biles, an expert on naval architecture at the University of Glasgow; and Edward Chaston, an Admiralty senior engineer assessor.

Also involved were the Attorney General, Sir Rufus Isaacs (representing the Board of Trade), Robert Finlay (representing the White Star Line), Thomas Scanlan, and Clement Edwards. Organisations represented included shipping unions and government organisations. The maritime law firm Hill Dickinson represented the White Star Line. Other counsel (several of whom were also Members of Parliament) included Hamar Greenwood and Henry Duke, the solicitor general John Simon (also representing the Board of Trade), the prime minister's son Raymond Asquith, Sidney Rowlatt, and Edward Maurice Hill.

Organisations with counsel representing or watching on their behalf included the Board of Trade, the White Star Line, the National Sailors' and Firemen's Union of Great Britain and Ireland (see National Union of Seamen), the Chamber of Shipping of the United Kingdom, the British Seafarers' Union, the Imperial Merchant Service Guild, the Marine Engineers' Association, the National Union of Stewards (see National Union of Ship's Stewards), and the builders of the ship, Harland & Wolff. Organisations with representatives watching the proceedings were Allan Line Royal Mail Steamers, Canadian Pacific Railway, and Leyland Line.

== Testimony ==
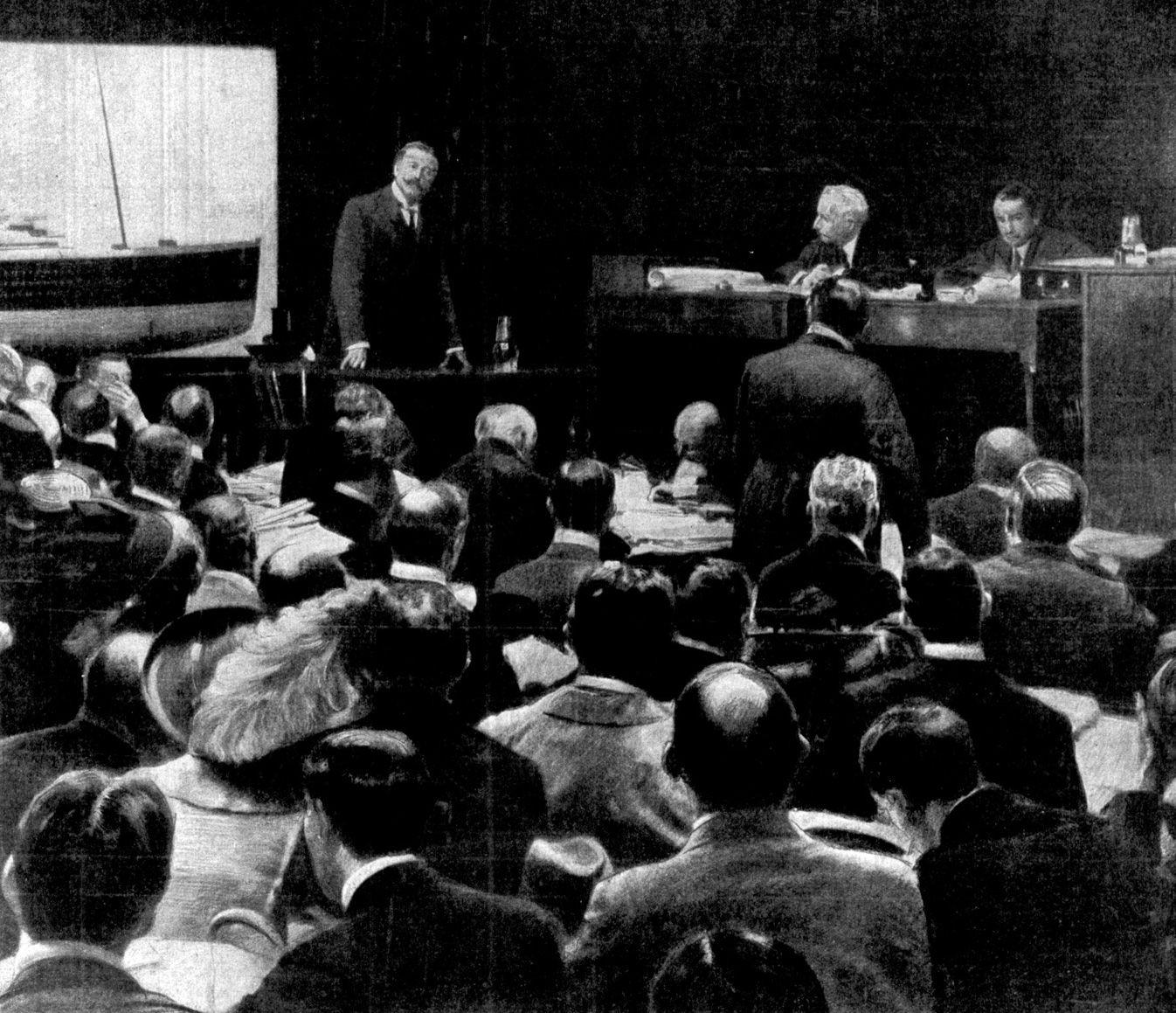
Sir Cosmo Duff-Gordon's testimony was a highlight of the inquiry, attracting many society figures

During 36 days of official investigations (spread over two months), testimony was recorded from nearly 100 witnesses in the form of answers to set questions that the process was designed to answer. These questions, combined with sometimes extensive cross-examination, resulted in over 25,000 questions being recorded in the official court records. With a cost of nearly £20,000 (£1,373,468 at today's prices), it was the longest and most detailed court of inquiry in British history up to that time. Those testifying included surviving passengers and crew members, as well as captains and crew members of other ships in the vicinity, expert witnesses, government officials, and White Star Line officials and ship designers.

Several surviving crew members who testified included the four surviving officers, Charles Lightoller (second officer), Herbert Pitman (third officer), Joseph Boxhall (fourth officer), and Harold Lowe (fifth officer); and surviving wireless operator Harold Bride. Those from other ships who gave evidence at the hearings included Harold Cottam (wireless operator on Carpathia), Cyril Evans (wireless operator on Californian), Stanley Lord (Captain of Californian), and Arthur Rostron (Captain of Carpathia), Expert witnesses included Guglielmo Marconi (Chairman of the Marconi Company), and explorer Sir Ernest Shackleton.

Others called to give testimony included Harold Arthur Sanderson, the Vice President of International Mercantile Marine Company (IMM). White Star Line officials that testified included J. Bruce Ismay (chairman and managing director, and President of the IMM) and Charles Alfred Bartlett (Marine Superintendent). From Harland and Wolff, evidence was given by Alexander Carlisle (Naval Architect). Carlisle was the brother-in-law of the shipyard's chairman Lord Pirrie, and together with Pirrie was initially responsible for the design of the Olympic-class liners (including Titanic); and by Edward Wilding who, along with Thomas Andrews who died aboard Titanic, was one of the chief designers of the ship.

The only passengers to testify, other than Ismay, were Sir Cosmo Duff-Gordon and his wife Lucy, Lady Duff-Gordon.

Q: In view of the fact that this vessel had been sending up rockets, and in view of the fact that you said it looks queer, did not you think at the time that that ship was in distress?

A: No.

Q: Are you sure?

A: I did not think the ship was in distress at the time.

Q: It never occurred to you?

A: It did not occur to me because if there had been any grounds for supposing the ship would have been in distress the Captain would have expressed it to me.

— Herbert Stone (Second Officer of the Californian), British Wreck Commissioner's Inquiry.

The questioning of the Californian's crew and the Duff-Gordons were seen as highlights of the inquiry. The failure of Californian to go to the rescue of the sinking Titanic, which had been disclosed by the American inquiry, was already controversial and became even more so with the testimony of Captain Lord and his officers. Lord's claims and explanations were contradicted by his officers and he was portrayed by them as an intimidating and somewhat tyrannical figure. Although Lord appeared only as a witness and was not accused of wrongdoing, as one historian of the Titanic disaster has put it, "the image created in the mind of the public ever since has been of the Californian's officers standing idly on the bridge, so thoroughly intimidated by their captain that they would rather watch another ship sink than run the risk of facing his wrath."

The testimony of the Duff Gordons, who had been accused of misconduct for their actions in leaving Titanic aboard a lifeboat with 40 seats but only 12 passengers, attracted the largest crowds of the inquiry. Many notable society figures attended, including Margot Asquith, the wife of Prime Minister H. H. Asquith; the Russian Ambassador to London, Count Alexander Von Beckendorf; several Members of Parliament, and various aristocrats.

== Report and conclusions ==
The final report was published on 30 July 1912. The lines of questioning at the inquiry had resulted in a detailed description of the ship, an account of the ship's journey, a description of the damage caused by the iceberg, an account of the evacuation and rescue. There was also a special section devoted to the circumstances of Californian.

The report found that Titanic's sinking was solely the result of colliding with the iceberg, not due to any inherent flaws with the ship, and that the collision had been brought about by a dangerously fast speed in icy waters:

The Court, having carefully inquired into the circumstances of the above mentioned shipping casualty, finds, for the reasons appearing in the annex hereto, that the loss of the said ship was due to collision with an iceberg, brought about by the excessive speed at which the ship was being navigated.

It also found that the lookout being kept was inadequate given the navigational hazards Titanic faced, and that the ship's officers had been complacent. There were too few lifeboats available and they had not been properly filled or manned with trained seamen, though they had been lowered correctly. The inquiry concluded that Californian "could have pushed through the ice to the open water without any serious risk and so have come to the assistance of the Titanic. Had she done so she might have saved many if not all of the lives that were lost." The Board of Trade's representative suggested to Lord Mersey that a formal inquiry should be held into Captain Lord's "competency to continue as Master of a British ship" but no action was taken against him due to legal technicalities. The Board of Trade was criticised for its inadequate regulations, notably the failure to ensure that enough lifeboats were provided and that crews were given proper training in their use. The Duff-Gordons were cleared of wrongdoing but it was made clear that they should have acted more tactfully.

In contrast to the American inquiry, the Mersey report did not condemn the failures of the Board of Trade, the White Star Line or Titanic's captain, Edward Smith. The report found that although Smith was at fault for not changing course or slowing down, he had not been negligent because he had followed long-standing practice which had not previously been shown to be unsafe (the inquiry noted that British ships alone had carried 3.5 million passengers over the previous decade with the loss of just 10 lives). It concluded that Smith had merely done "only that which other skilled men would have done in the same position." However, the practice itself was faulty and "it is to be hoped that the last has been heard of this practice. What was a mistake in the case of the Titanic would without doubt be negligence in any similar case in the future."

The report's recommendations, along with those of the earlier United States Senate inquiry that had taken place in the month after the sinking, led to changes in safety practices.

== Reactions ==
The report was well received by the British press. The Daily Telegraph commented that although "technically speaking, the report is not the last word, but in practice it would probably be treated as if it were." The Daily Mail opined that it was "difficult to suppose that any court which had to inquire into the responsibility of the owners of the ship would disregard the expression of opinion of Lord Mersey and those who sat with him ... The report having, in effect, acquitted them of all blame, it is not likely that any attempt will be made hereafter to establish the contrary."

Others were more critical. In his memoirs, Charles Lightoller pointed out the inquiry's conflict of interest: "A washing of dirty linen would help no one. The Board of Trade had passed that ship as in all respects fit for the sea ... Now the Board of Trade was holding an inquiry into the loss of that ship – hence the whitewash brush." Titanic historian Donald Lynch notes the consequences: "Apart from protecting itself, the [Board of Trade] had no interest in seeing the White Star Line found negligent. Any damage to White Star's reputation or balance sheet would be bad for British shipping – and there was considerable potential for both. Negligence on the part of the shipping company might pave the way for millions of dollars in damage claims and lawsuits that would tie up the courts for years, possibly break the White Star Line, and result in the loss of much of Britain's lucrative shipping traffic to the Germans and the French."

Stephanie Barczewski notes the contrast between the approaches taken by the American and British inquiries. The British inquiry was much more technical, "the more learned and erudite of the two", while the American inquiry's report was a reflection of a comparatively poorly managed inquiry that had frequently allowed itself to get sidetracked. However, the American report took a much more robust stance on the failures that had led to the disaster. The authors of the two reports took markedly different interpretations of how the disaster had come about. The American report castigated the complacency that had led to the disaster and held Captain Smith, the shipping industry and the Board of Trade culpable for their failures. The British report emphasized that "the importance of this Enquiry has to do with the future. No Enquiry can repair the past."

== See also ==
- United States Senate inquiry into the sinking of the Titanic

== Bibliography ==
- Barczewski, Stephanie (2011). Titanic: A Night Remembered. London: Continuum International. ISBN 978-1-4411-6169-7.
- Butler, Daniel Allen (1998). Unsinkable: The Full Story of RMS Titanic. Mechanicsburg, Pennsylvania: Stackpole Books. ISBN 978-0-8117-1814-1.
- Eaton, John P.; Haas, Charles A. (1994). Titanic: Triumph and Tragedy. Wellingborough, UK: Patrick Stephens. ISBN 978-1-85260-493-6.
- Lynch, Donald (1998). Titanic: An Illustrated History. New York: Hyperion. ISBN 978-0-7868-6401-0.
- Ward, Greg (2012). The Rough Guide to the Titanic. London: Rough Guides Ltd. ISBN 978-1-4053-8699-9.
