= Britannic (film) =

2000 television film by Brian Trenchard-Smith

- UK DVD cover art for Britannic
- Directed by: Brian Trenchard-Smith
- Starring: Edward Atterton; Amanda Ryan; Jacqueline Bisset; Ben Daniels; John Rhys-Davies; Bruce Payne
- Countries of origin: United States; United Kingdom
- Original languages: English; German

Production
- Executive producers: David Forrest; Stephen P. Jarchow; Beau Rogers
- Producer: Paul Colichman
- Running time: 93 minutes
- Production company: Flashpoint

Original release
- Network: Fox Family Channel
- Release: 10 January 2000

Britannic is a 2000 spy television film directed by Brian Trenchard-Smith. The film depicts a heavily fictionalized version of the sinking of HMHS Britannic in 1916. The film portrays a German agent sabotaging her while she is serving as a hospital ship for the British Army during World War I. It stars Edward Atterton and Amanda Ryan, with Jacqueline Bisset, Ben Daniels, John Rhys-Davies, and Bruce Payne as co-stars. It first premiered on cable network Fox Family and was then broadcast in the United Kingdom on Channel 4.

== Plot ==
In Southampton in 1916, HMHS Britannic, a sister ship of the Titanic, is commissioned as a hospital vessel for wounded Allied soldiers fighting in the Gallipoli Campaign. Among the nurses who are to serve aboard her is Lady Lewis, who is being delivered to Greece via Naples, where her husband has become Ambassador for Great Britain. Traveling with her is Vera Campbell, her governess, who is unnerved and faints during boarding, having survived the Titanic's sinking four years earlier, losing her husband. She discloses to Captain Barrett and First Officer Townsend that she is an operative of British Intelligence, and suspects a German spy has boarded the Britannic. Barrett is sceptical that a woman can do such a job and Townsend mocks Vera.

The German spy has boarded the Britannic posing as her murdered chaplain, Chaplain Reynolds, and finds that the ship is secretly carrying a large amount of small arms and munitions bound for Cairo. Under the articles of war, Reynolds considers his actions against Britannic to be legal and initiates a series of sabotage attempts to either take over or sink her, including inciting the Irish stokers, all members of the Irish Republican Brotherhood, to mutiny. Although she reports odd sightings and behaviours to the captain, Barrett scoffs at Vera's notion, and refuses to take her seriously, though Townsend warms up to her. Vera indirectly reveals to Reynolds her cover and admits she has lost her confidence due to being judged as a woman. The two find themselves growing attracted to each other. A mutiny is attempted and Vera intervenes by killing one of the men, with the co-operation of the Britannic's crew, foiling it; in the process, Vera earns the trust of the captain who apologizes for his chauvinistic behavior and is treated as an equal by the crew and Townsend from then on, much to her elation. She is praised as a hero and is treated with respect by the crew. A German U-boat is sunk by the British battleship, HMS Victoria as it tries to torpedo Britannic.

Reynolds makes the decision to sink the ship after leaving Naples, Italy. Vera and Reynolds make love before she discovers his true identity. She confronts him in the engine room where Reynolds reveals his real name, Ernst Tilbach of Imperial German Intelligence, and then throws a Molotov cocktail into the engine room causing a hole in the Britannic's bow. The ship tries sailing for the Greek island Kea seven miles away, but the beaching operation causes her to flood even faster. Vera discovers that William, one of Lady Lewis's children, has disappeared. Ernst helps her and they get William to a lifeboat before it is lowered. Another explosion causes Ernst to be trapped in a flooding room. Vera helps him escape and they make their way through the ship, swimming through flooded rooms, vents, grates, and corridors, eventually making it outside by swimming through a porthole and climbing aboard an empty lifeboat that has been lowered into the water, but still attached by its ropes to the davits. After a lifeboat filled with people is pulled into the still spinning propellers and smashed to pieces by the spinning blades, Ernst ties Vera to a line thrown to them from a nearby lifeboat and despite her protests that they both can be pulled to safety, he throws her into the sea after kissing her. The lifeboat's ropes break and it is sucked into the propellers; Ernst commits suicide, staying aboard the lifeboat as it is smashed by the blades. The Britannic capsizes and finally sinks. Vera is comforted by Townsend as HMS Victoria arrives to rescue the survivors.

== Cast ==
- Amanda Ryan as Vera Campbell
- Edward Atterton as Chaplain Reynolds/Major Ernst Tillbach
- Jacqueline Bisset as Lady Lewis
- Ben Daniels as Townsend
- John Rhys-Davies as Captain Barrett
- Bruce Payne as Doctor Baker
- Alex Ferns as Stoker Evans
- Eleanor Oakley as Sarah Lewis
- Archie Davies as William Lewis
- Ed Stobart as Mayfield
- Adam Bareham as Britannic's Radio Operator
- David Lumsden as German Radio Operator
- Wolf Kahler as Captain Kruger
- Philip Rham as Jurgens
- Daniel Coonan as Seamus
- Daniel Tatatrsky as Martin
- Martin Savage as Sweeney
- Francis Magee as Reilly
- Sean Baker as Colonel Marston
- Niven Boyd as Captain Helm

== Production ==
Production began in early 1999. Historian Simon Mills learned from Trenchard-Smith that the film was fictional and not meant to be historically accurate. When he noted that Captain Charles Alfred Bartlett was fictionalised as "Captain Barrett", he was told that the name had been changed for legal reasons. Although he requested to be labelled as "technical consultant", he was named as "historical consultant" in the credits. Filming took place at Bray Film Studios, Kempton Park Pumping Station, The Church of Clewer St. Stephen and Victoria House.

Trenchard-Smith says the film was the best of the three disaster movies he made around this time. It got him the job directing Megiddo: The Omega Code 2.

== Reception ==
David Kronke, Los Angeles Daily News, was somewhat complimentary about the film's humour and short running length, when compared to 1997's Titanic, but felt that the movie "bl[ew] it in the last half hour", due to badly executed plot contrivance and the climax being too similar to that of Cameron's. He was also critical of Jacqueline Bisset's acting.

Ray Richmond, writing in Variety, thought that the movie was an attempt to cash in on the popularity of the 1997 movie, but without an equivalent budget or pathos and felt that although it did "everything in its power to emulate [...] 'Titanic'" it came "far closer to outright satire". He criticised the special effects and concluded that "authenticity proves the greatest casualty".

Reviewing Britannic, Chris Cox of myReviewer.com called it "a dreadful film that deserves to sink to the bottom of the sea and join the wreck of the ship".

== See also ==
- List of American films of 2000
