= United States Senate inquiry into the sinking of the Titanic =

Maritime disaster investigation

Senate Subcommittee on the Sinking of the White Star Liner "Titanic"
Special Subcommittee of the Senate Commerce Committee
- Defunct United States Senate; 62nd Congress

History
- Formed: April 17, 1912
- Disbanded: Disbanded May 28, 1912, following the release of the committee's final report

Leadership
- Chair: William Alden Smith (R)

Structure
- Seats: 7
- Political parties: Majority (4): Republican (4); Minority (3): Democratic (3)

Jurisdiction
- Purpose: Investigate the causes of the sinking of the RMS Titanic

Meeting place
- Waldorf-Astoria New York; Russell Senate Office Building

The sinking of the RMS Titanic on April 14–15, 1912 resulted in an inquiry by a subcommittee of the Commerce Committee of the United States Senate, chaired by Senator William Alden Smith. The hearings began in New York on April 19, 1912, later moving to Washington, D.C., concluding on May 25, 1912, with a return visit to New York.

There were a total of 18 days of official investigation. Smith and seven other senators questioned surviving passengers and crew, along with people who had helped in the rescue. More than 80 witnesses gave testimony or deposited affidavits. Subjects covered included the ice warnings received, the inadequate number of lifeboats, the handling of the ship and its speed, Titanic's distress calls, and the handling of the evacuation of the ship.

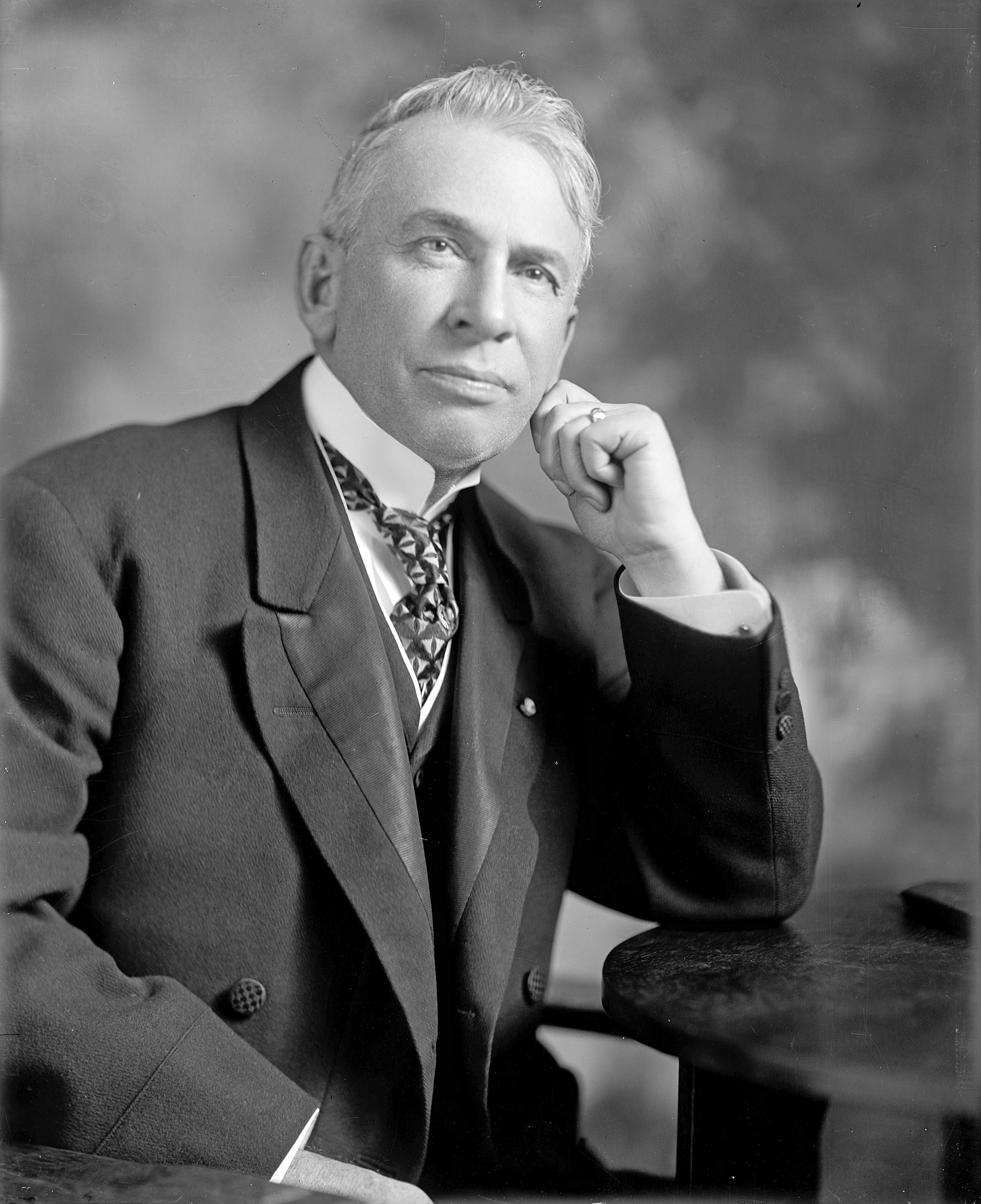
Senator William Alden Smith chaired the inquiry.

The subcommittee's report was presented to the United States Senate on May 28, 1912. Its recommendations, along with those of the British inquiry that concluded a few months later, led to changes in safety practices following the disaster.

== Background ==
The sinking of RMS Titanic, a trans-Atlantic passenger liner owned and operated by the White Star Line, occurred in the early hours of April 15, 1912, while the ship was on its maiden voyage from Southampton, United Kingdom, to New York City, United States. The sinking was caused by a collision with an iceberg in the North Atlantic some 700 nautical miles east of Halifax, Nova Scotia. Over 1,500 passengers and crew died, with some 710 survivors in Titanic's lifeboats rescued by RMS Carpathia a short time later.

There was initially some confusion in both the US and the UK over the extent of the disaster, with some newspapers at first reporting that the ship and the passengers and crew were safe. By the time Carpathia reached New York, it had become clear that Titanic, reputed to be unsinkable, had sunk and many had died. Official inquiries were set up in both countries to investigate the circumstances of the disaster.

== Formation ==
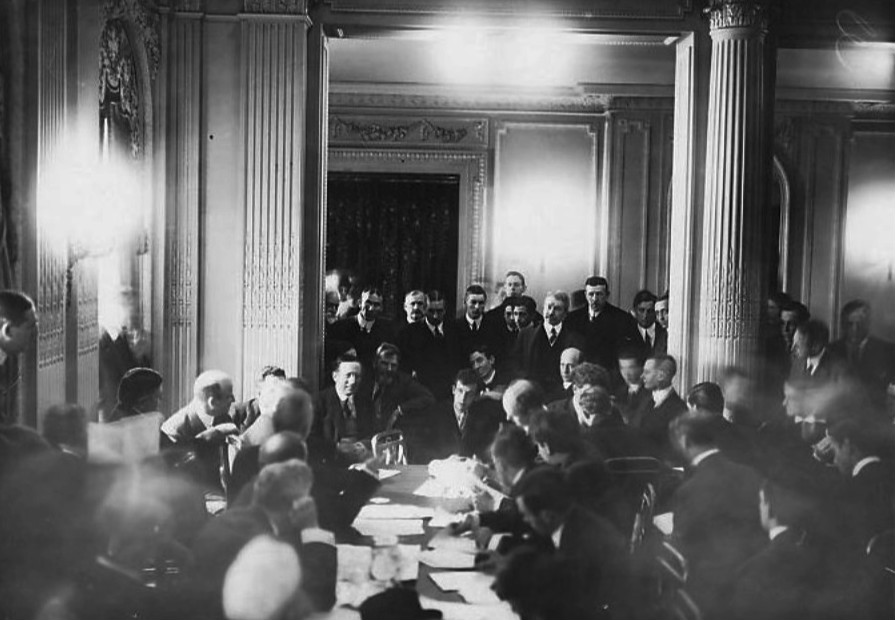
Surviving Titanic wireless operator Harold Bride (sitting; center) testifies at the committee meeting at the Waldorf-Astoria Hotel in New York; to his right is Marconi Company chairman Guglielmo Marconi.

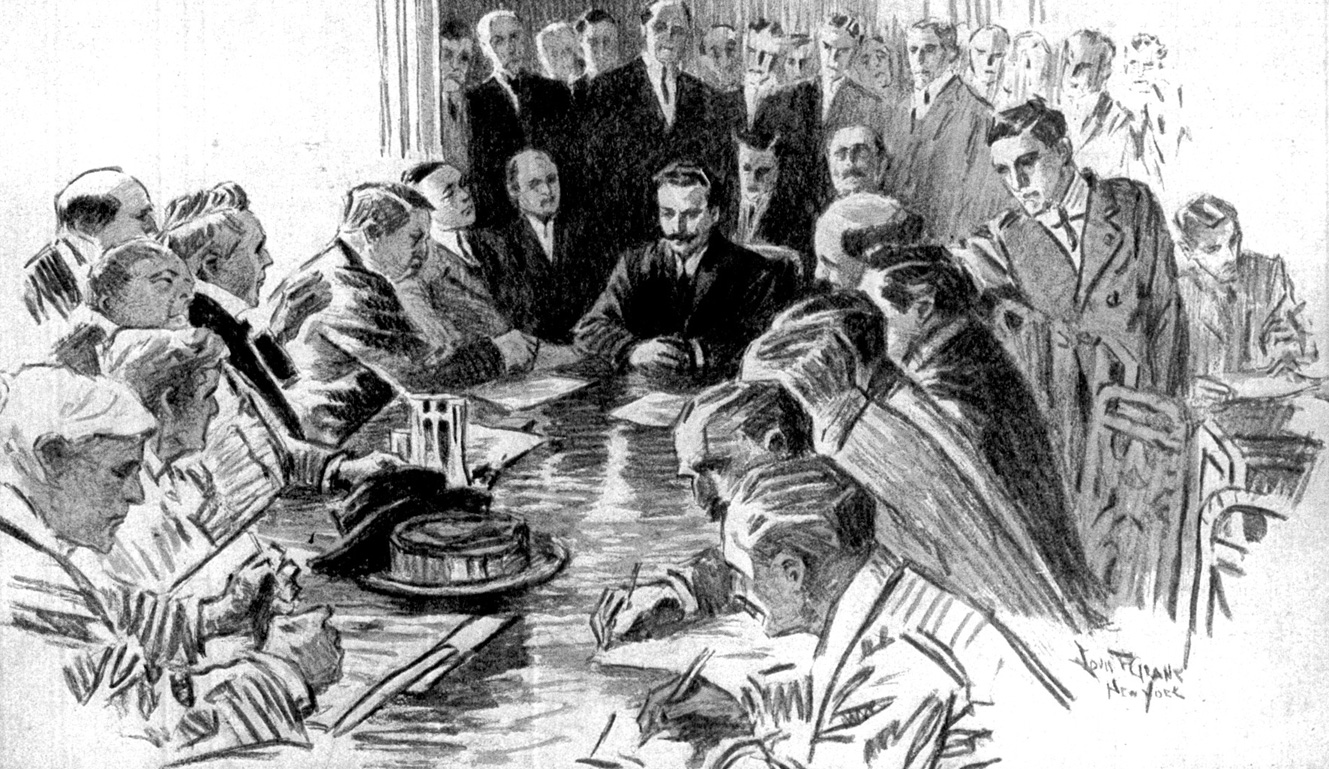
The opening day of the inquiry at the Waldorf-Astoria Hotel in New York, with J. Bruce Ismay being questioned

When news of the disaster reached Senator William Alden Smith, he saw an opportunity to establish an inquiry to investigate marine safety issues. Smith, who was a Republican Senator for Michigan, had previously investigated railroad safety issues and had sponsored many of the safety and operating regulations passed by Congress to govern the operations of the American rail industry. He realized the need for rapid action if a US inquiry was to be possible before the surviving passengers and crew dispersed and returned home. He first attempted to contact US President William Howard Taft, but was told by the President's secretary that no action was intended.

Despite this, Smith took the initiative and on April 17, 1912, he addressed the Senate and proposed a resolution that would grant the Committee on Commerce powers to establish a hearing to investigate the sinking. Smith's resolution passed, and fellow Senator Knute Nelson, chair of the Commerce Committee, appointed Smith as chair of a subcommittee to carry out the hearings. The following day Smith met with President Taft, who had just received the news that his friend and military advisor Archibald Butt was not on the list of survivors. Taft and Smith arranged additional measures related to the inquiry, including a naval escort for Carpathia to ensure that no one left the ship before it docked.

That afternoon, Smith, fellow senator and subcommittee member Francis G. Newlands, and other officials traveled by train to New York, planning to meet Carpathia as it docked on the evening of 18 April 1912. It was already known that J. Bruce Ismay, chairman and managing director of White Star Line, had survived, and the intention was to serve subpoenas on Ismay and the surviving officers and crew, requiring them to remain in the United States and give testimony at the inquiry. Smith and his colleagues boarded Carpathia and informed Ismay that he would be required to testify before the subcommittee the following morning. The hearings began on 19 April 1912 at the Waldorf-Astoria Hotel, New York, and later moved to Washington, D.C., where they were held in the Russell Senate Office Building.

== Committee ==
Seven senators served on the subcommittee: three Republicans and three Democrats in addition to Smith as chair. The other six senators were Jonathan Bourne (Republican, Oregon), Theodore E. Burton (Republican, Ohio), Duncan U. Fletcher (Democrat, Florida), Francis G. Newlands (Democrat, Nevada), George Clement Perkins (Republican, California), and Furnifold McLendel Simmons (Democrat, North Carolina). The composition of the subcommittee was carefully chosen to represent the conservative, moderate and liberal wings of the two parties.

Questioning was carried out by various members of the committee at various times, and not all seven senators were present for each meeting. The work of the committee was dominated by Smith, who personally conducted the questioning of all of the key witnesses. This caused some tension among the members of the committee and made him a number of enemies, as it was interpreted as an attempt to seize the limelight. Some members attended later hearings infrequently as there was little for them to do.

== Testimony ==
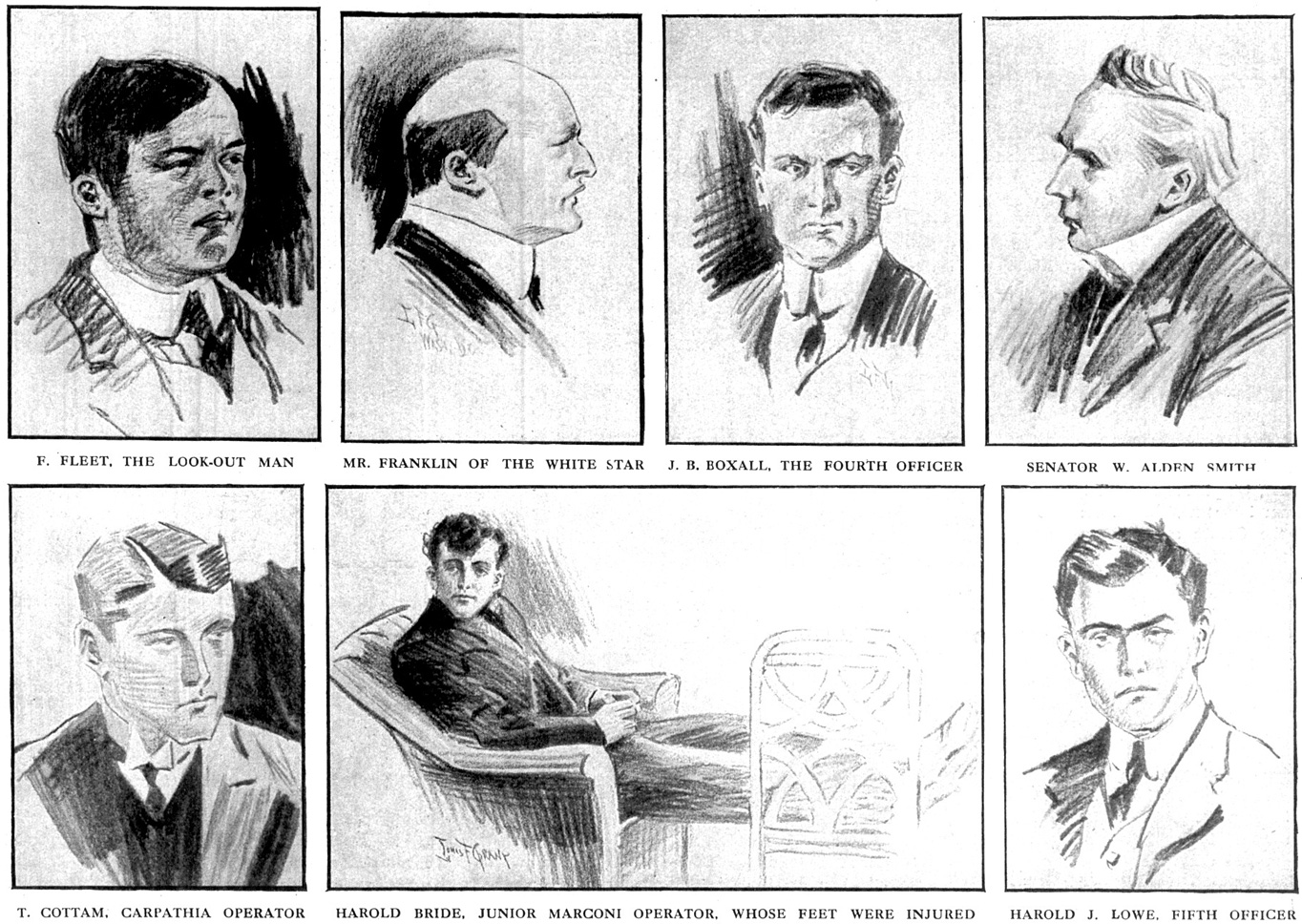
Witnesses at the Senate inquiry

During 18 days of official investigations, punctuated by recesses, testimony was recorded from over 80 witnesses. These included surviving passengers and crew members, as well as captains and crew members of other ships in the vicinity, expert witnesses, and various officials and others involved in receiving and transmitting the news of the disaster. The evidence submitted varied from spoken testimony and questioning, to the deposition of correspondence and affidavits. Subjects covered included the ice warnings received, the inadequate, but legal, number of lifeboats, the handling of the ship and its speed, Titanic's distress calls, and the handling of the evacuation of the ship.

Surviving officials, crew, and passengers who were questioned or provided evidence included J. Bruce Ismay (who was the first to be questioned); the most senior surviving officer, Charles Lightoller (Second Officer on Titanic); the lookout who sounded the alarm, Frederick Fleet; the surviving wireless operator, Harold Bride; and first-class passenger Archibald Gracie IV.

Those that testified from among the captains and crew of other ships included Arthur Rostron (Captain of Carpathia), Harold Cottam (wireless operator on Carpathia), Stanley Lord (Captain of SS Californian), and Herbert Haddock (Captain of RMS Olympic). Expert witnesses, speaking or corresponding on subjects such as radio communications, iceberg formation, and newspaper reporting, included Guglielmo Marconi (Chairman of the Marconi Company), George Otis Smith (Director of the United States Geological Survey), and Melville Elijah Stone (General Manager of the Associated Press).

Others called to give testimony included Phillip A. S. Franklin, vice president of International Mercantile Marine Co., the shipping consortium headed by J. P. Morgan that controlled White Star Line. The inquiry concluded with Smith visiting Titanic's sister ship Olympic in port in New York on 25 May 1912, where he interviewed some members of the crew and inspected the ship's system of watertight doors and bulkheads, which was identical to that of Titanic.

== Report and conclusions ==
The final report was presented to the United States Senate on May 28, 1912. It was nineteen pages long, with 44 pages of exhibits, and summarised 1,145 pages of testimony and affidavits. Its recommendations, along with those of the British inquiry that concluded on 3 July 1912, led to many changes in safety practices following the disaster. The report's key findings were:

- A lack of emergency preparations had left Titanic's passengers and crew in "a state of absolute unpreparedness", and the evacuation had been chaotic: "No general alarm was given, no ship's officers formally assembled, no orderly routine was attempted or organized system of safety begun."
- The ship's safety and life-saving equipment had not been properly tested.
- Titanic's Captain Edward Smith had shown an "indifference to danger [that] was one of the direct and contributing causes of this unnecessary tragedy."
- The lack of lifeboats was the fault of the British Board of Trade, "to whose laxity of regulation and hasty inspection the world is largely indebted for this awful tragedy."
- The SS Californian had been "much nearer [to Titanic] than the captain is willing to admit" and the British Government should take "drastic action" against him for his actions.
- J. Bruce Ismay had not ordered Captain Smith to put on extra speed, but Ismay's presence on board may have contributed to the captain's decision to do so.
- Third-class passengers had not been prevented from reaching the lifeboats, but had in many cases not realised until it was too late that the ship was sinking.

The report was strongly critical of established seafaring practices and the roles that Titanic's builders, owners, and crew had played in contributing to the disaster. It highlighted the complacency that had been prevalent in the shipping industry and the British Board of Trade. However, it did not find IMM or the White Star Line negligent under existing maritime laws, as they had merely followed standard practice, and the disaster could thus only be categorised as an "act of God".

Senator Smith made a number of recommendations for new regulations to be imposed on passenger vessels wishing to use American ports:

- Ships should slow down on entering areas known to have drifting ice and should post extra lookouts.
- Navigational messages should be brought promptly to the bridge and disseminated as required.
- There should be enough lifeboats for all on board.
- All ships equipped with wireless sets should maintain communications at all times of the day and night.
- New regulations were needed to govern the use of radiotelegraphy.
- Adequate boat drills were to be carried out for passengers.
- Rockets should only be fired by ships at sea as distress signals, and not for any other purposes.

The presentation of the US report was accompanied by two speeches, one from Smith and one from Senator Isidor Rayner (Democrat, Maryland). Towards the end of his speech, Smith declared:

The calamity through which we have just passed has left traces of sorrow everywhere; hearts have been broken and deep anguish unexpressed; art will typify with master hand its lavish contribution to the sea; soldiers of state and masters of trade will receive the homage which is their honest due; hills will be cleft in search of marble white enough to symbolize these heroic deeds, and, where kinship is the only tie that binds the lowly to the humble home bereft of son or mother or father, little groups of kinsfolk will recount, around the kitchen fire, the traits of human sympathy in those who went down with the ship. These are choice pictures in the treasure house of the affections, but even these will sometime fade; the sea is the place permanently to honor our dead; this should be the occasion for a new birth of vigilance, and future generations must accord to this event a crowning motive for better things.

Rayner's closing words drew applause from the assembled Senators:

The sounds of that awe-inspiring requiem that vibrated o'er the ocean have been drowned in the waters of the deep, the instruments that gave them birth are silenced as the harps were silenced on the willow tree, but if the melody that was rehearsed could only reverberate through this land "Nearer, My God, to Thee," and its echoes could be heard in these halls of legislation, and at every place where our rulers and representatives pass judgment and enact and administer laws, and at every home and fireside, from the mansions of the rich to the huts and hovels of the poor, and if we could be made to feel that there is a divine law of obedience and of adjustment, and of compensation that should demand our allegiance, far above the laws that we formulate in this presence, then, from the gloom of these fearful hours we shall pass into the dawn of a higher service and of a better day, and then, Mr. President, the lives that went down upon this fated night did not go down in vain.

Smith proposed three pieces of legislation: a joint resolution with the House of Representatives to award a Congressional Gold Medal to Captain Rostron of the Carpathia; a bill to re-evaluate existing maritime legislation; and another joint resolution to establish a commission to enquire into the laws and regulations on the construction and equipment of maritime vessels. The report's recommendations on the regulation of wireless telegraphy were implemented in the form of the Radio Act of 1912, which mandated that all radio stations in the US be licensed by the federal government, as well as mandating that seagoing vessels continuously monitor distress frequencies. The existing Wireless Ship Act of 1910 was also amended to add new regulations governing how wireless telegraphy aboard ships was to be managed.

== Reactions ==
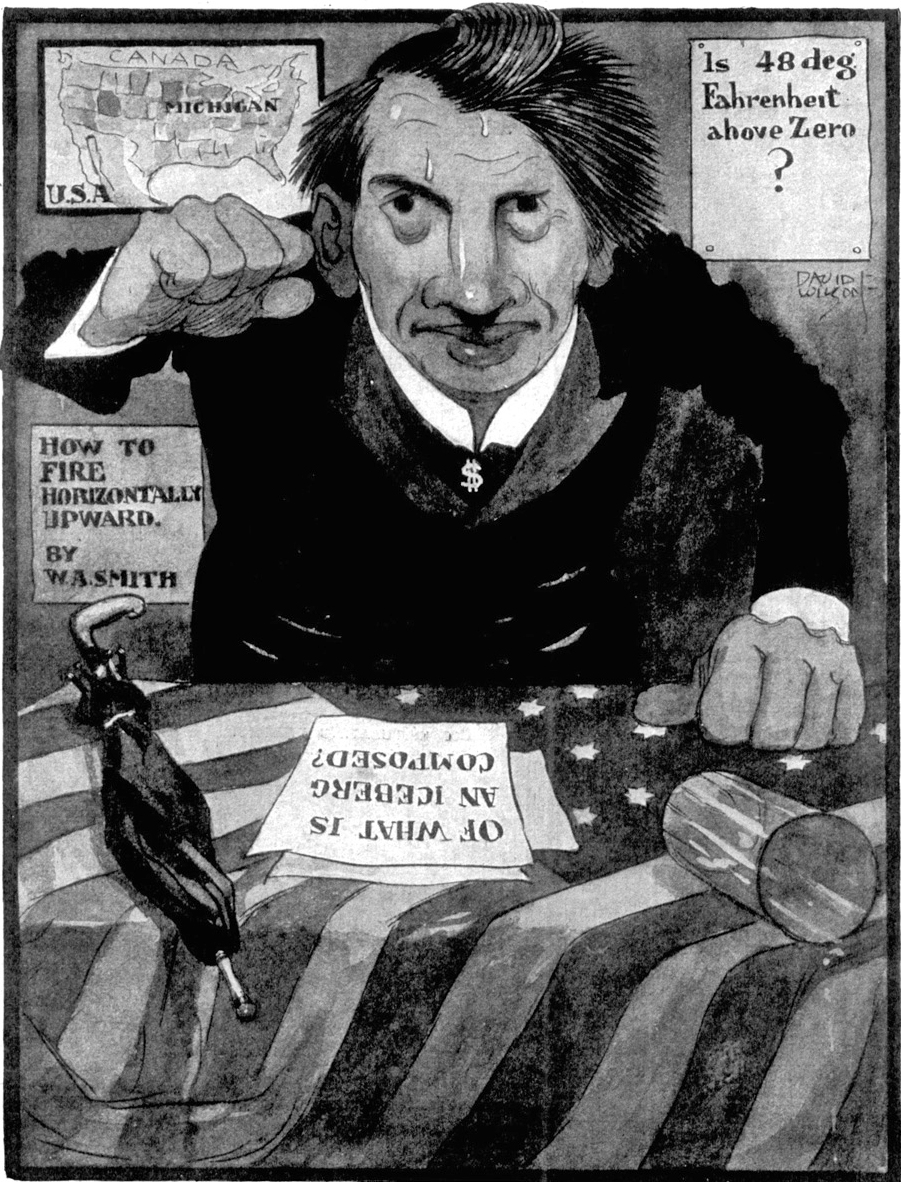
"The Importance of being Earnest", satirical cartoon by David Wilson attacking Smith's chairmanship of the inquiry

The inquiry was heavily criticized in Britain, both for its conduct and for Smith's style of questioning, which on one occasion saw him asking Titanic's Fifth Officer Harold Lowe if he knew what an iceberg was made of. Lowe's response was "Ice, I suppose, sir". Smith was unfamiliar with life at sea and asked a number of questions exposing this, including asking lookout Frederick Fleet whether he would ever eat in the crow's nest and asking wireless operator Harold Bride to confirm what frequently used code signals like CQD meant.

Even though Titanic was indirectly owned by an American consortium, International Mercantile Marine, the inquiry was seen as an attack on the British shipping industry, and an affront to British honor.

The subcommittee was criticized for having the audacity to subpoena British subjects while Smith was ridiculed for his apparent naiveté. He became the butt of music-hall jokes and was given the nickname of "Watertight" Smith. London's leading music-hall venue, the Hippodrome, offered him $50,000 to perform there on stage on any subject he liked, an offer that was not taken up, and the press mocked Smith relentlessly as a fool, an ignoramus and an ass.

One satirical song of the time went:

I'm Senator Smith of the USA,
Senator Smith, that's me!
A big bug in the enquiry way,
Senator Smith, that's me!
You're fixed right up if you infer
I'm a cuss of a cast-iron character.
When I says that a thing has got ter be,
That thing's as good as done, d'yer see?
I'm going to ask questions and find out some
If I sit right here till kingdom come –
That's me!
Senator Smith of the USA.

Many newspapers published scathing editorial cartoons depicting Smith in unflattering terms, such as the Irish cartoonist David Wilson's illustration of "The Importance of being Earnest", published by The Graphic. Such views crossed party and class divides. The Morning Post asserted that "a schoolboy would blush at Mr. Smith's ignorance" while the Daily Mirror denounced him for having "made himself ridiculous in the eyes of British seamen. British seamen know something about ships. Senator Smith does not." The Graphic claimed that the Senator had "set the whole world laughing by the appalling ignorance betrayed by [his] questions." The Daily Telegraph suggested that the inquiry was fatally flawed by employing non-experts, which had "effectively illustrated the inability of the lay mind to grasp the problem of marine navigation."

Similar concerns were expressed by the Daily Mail, which complained that "it has no technical knowledge, and its proceedings ... show a want of familiarity with nautical matters and with the sea", and by the Evening Standard, which criticized the inquiry for being "as expert in investigating marine matters as a country magistrate's bench might have been." Smith's own antecedents attracted ridicule; the Daily Express called him "a backwoodsman from Michigan", which the newspaper characterized as a state "populated by kangaroos and by cowboys with an intimate acquaintance of prairie schooners as the only kind of boat". His closing speech to the Senate came in for particularly harsh criticism from the British press, which termed it "bombastic", "grotesque" and "a violent, unreasoning diatribe."

The British government was also hostile towards the inquiry. Sir Edward Grey, the Foreign Secretary, spoke of his contempt for the way the senator had put the blame in a "denunciatory" fashion on the inadequate regulations implemented by the British Board of Trade. The British Ambassador to the United States, James Bryce, demanded that President Taft should dissolve the committee and refused to recognise its jurisdiction.

Some British writers, however, applauded the inquiry. G. K. Chesterton contrasted the American objective of maximum openness with what he called Britain's "national evil", which he described as being to "hush everything up; it is to damp everything down; it is to leave the great affair unfinished, to leave every enormous question unanswered." He argued that "it does not much matter whether Senator Smith knows the facts; what matters is whether he is really trying to find them out." The Review of Reviews, whose founder William Stead was among the victims of the disaster, declared: "We prefer the ignorance of Senator Smith to the knowledge of Mr. Ismay. Experts have told us the Titanic was unsinkable – we prefer ignorance to such knowledge!"

The American reaction was also generally positive. The New York Herald published a supportive editorial commenting: "Nothing has been more sympathetic, more gentle in its highest sense than the conduct of the inquiry by the Senate committee, and yet self-complacent moguls in England call this impertinent ... This country intends to find out why so many American lives were wasted by the incompetency of British seamen, and why women and children were sent to their deaths while so many British crew have been saved." The American press welcomed Smith's findings and accepted his recommendations, commending the senator for establishing the key facts of the disaster.

=== Adaptations ===
Tom Kuntz published an edited version of the Senate hearings in 1998. A multi-cast audiobook version of the Kuntz version won a 1999 Audie Award.

== See also ==
- British Wreck Commissioner's inquiry into the sinking of the Titanic
- Wreck of the Titanic

== Bibliography ==
- Barczewski, Stephanie (2011). Titanic: A Night Remembered. London: Continuum International Publishing Group. ISBN 978-1-4411-6169-7.
- Butler, Daniel Allen (1998). Unsinkable: The Full Story of RMS Titanic. Mechanicsburg, PA: Stackpole Books. ISBN 978-0-8117-1814-1.
- Eaton, John P.; Haas, Charles A. (1994). Titanic: Triumph and Tragedy. Wellingborough, UK: Patrick Stephens. ISBN 978-1-85260-493-6.
- Gibson, Allen (2012). The Unsinkable Titanic. Stroud, Glos.: The History Press. ISBN 978-0-7524-5625-6.
- Lynch, Donald (1998). Titanic: An Illustrated History. New York: Hyperion. ISBN 978-0-7868-6401-0.
- Medoff, Norman; Kaye, Barbara K. (2010). Electronic Media: Then, Now, and Later. Focal Press. ISBN 978-0-2408-1256-4.
- Matson, Brad (2008). Titanic's Last Secrets. Twelve (Grand Central Publishing). ISBN 978-0446582056.
- Ward, Greg (2012). The Rough Guide to the Titanic. London: Rough Guides. ISBN 978-1-40538-699-9.
- Wolf, Lucien (May 4, 1912). "The American Inquiry into the Titanic Disaster". The Graphic.
