= Peter Padfield =

British author (1932–2022)

Peter L. N. Padfield (3 April 1932 – 14 March 2022) was a British author, biographer, historian, and journalist who specialised in naval history and in the Second World War period. His early journalism appeared under the name P. L. N. Padfield. As well as his non-fiction work, he also published four novels.

== Life and work ==
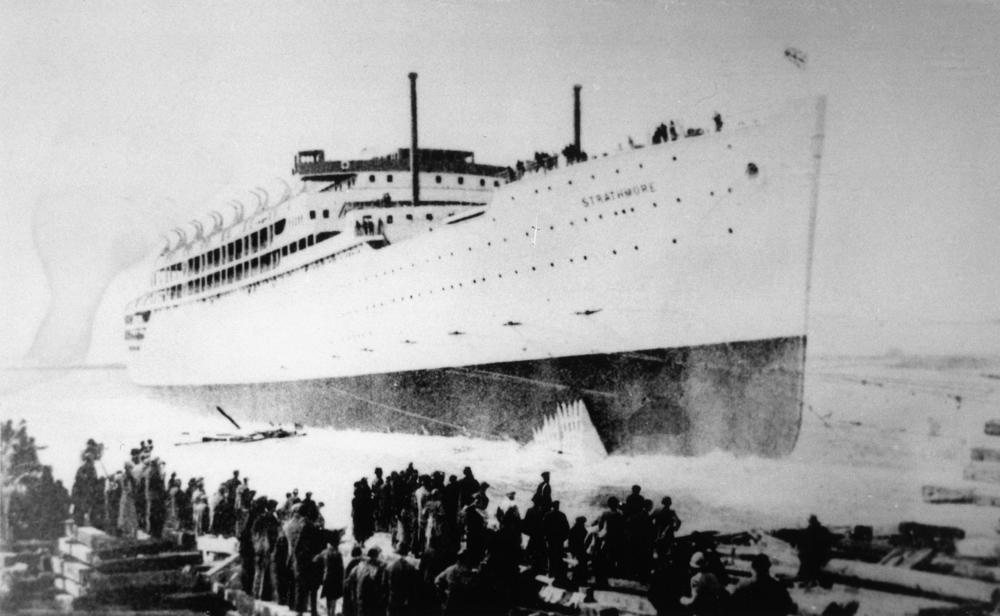
Strathmore, Padfield's last P&O ship

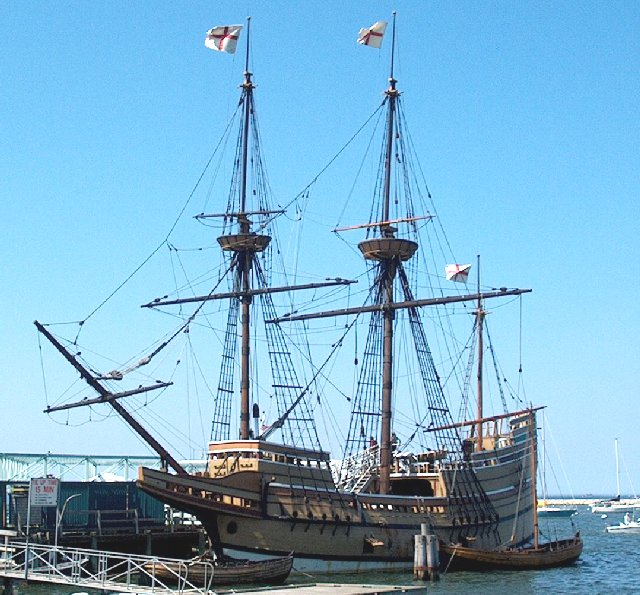
Mayflower II, in which Padfield shipped in 1957

Born on 3 April 1932 in Calcutta, in the Bengal Presidency of British India, Padfield attended a boarding school for boys, Christ's Hospital, then trained for a naval career as a Royal Naval Reserve cadet on HMS Worcester. He then became a navigating officer with the P&O shipping company. In 1957 he was paid off from P&O's London to Australia ocean liner Strathmore, after being accepted as one of the crew of Mayflower II, a replica of the original Mayflower, and sailed in her on her maiden voyage from Plymouth, Devon, to New York City. On leaving a junior officer's life with P&O, Padfield later commented that "Cargo boats, public schools, and prisons have a great deal in common". After New York, he returned to sea in the Pacific, including a visit to Guadalcanal in the Solomon Islands, where he panned for gold, then wrote The Sea is a Magic Carpet, published as a book in 1959, an account of his adventures.

Padfield settled in England and established a career in journalism. In his second book, The Titanic and the Californian, he defended the reputation of Captain Lord, the master of the Californian who since 1912 had been widely blamed for the death of hundreds of passengers on the Titanic. He concluded that in the Board of Trade Inquiry chaired by Lord Mersey there had been "crazy deductions, distortions, prejudice, and occasional bone-headed obstinacy of witnesses and the court", and the huge success of this enabled him to begin writing books full-time. Next came several works on naval history, including The Great Naval Race (1976), a study of the rivalry between Britain and Germany in the early 20th century, which led to biographies of three leading Nazis, Karl Dönitz, Heinrich Himmler, and Rudolf Hess. In 2003 he won the Mountbatten Maritime Prize for his Maritime Power and the Struggle for Freedom.

Padfield's most recent historical work was Hess, Hitler and Churchill (2013), in which he explores the mystery of Rudolf Hess's flight to Britain in 1941. He developed the theory that it may have been part of a significant German peace offer and suggested that Hess was carrying documents with detailed proposals from Adolf Hitler. These would have meant an armistice between Germany and Britain, which would stand neutral in a planned German war against the Soviet Union, in return for which Germany was willing to withdraw its armed forces from Western Europe. However, this theory "is not new", and has been disputed by other historians. According to Ian Kershaw, "Hess acted without Hitler's knowledge, but in the deep (if confused) belief that he was carrying out his wishes", and states that all those "who saw Hitler [at that time] registered his profound shock, dismay and anger at what he saw as betrayal."

== Personal life ==
In 1960 Padfield gave up his life at sea and married Jane Yarwood. They settled first at Clare, Suffolk, and brought up a son and two daughters in East Anglia, buying a gaff-rigged Norfolk shrimp boat for sailing on the River Deben. He lived in Woodbridge. Taking many holidays in Switzerland, until the arrival of old age the couple's interests included cross-country skiing in the winter months, and they continued with mountain walks in the summer. Padfield also sketched and painted in watercolours. He died on 14 March 2022, at the age of 89.

== Works ==
Autobiographical

- The Sea is a Magic Carpet (Peter Davies, 1959)

Naval history

- The Titanic and the Californian (1965, new edition by Thistle Publishing, 2015)
- An Agony of Collisions (Hodder & Stoughton, 1966)
- Aim Straight: a biography of Admiral Sir Percy Scott (Hodder & Stoughton, 1968)
- Broke and the Shannon: a biography of Admiral Sir Peter Broke (Hodder & Stoughton, 1969)
- Guns at Sea (Hugh Evelyn, 1972)
- The Battleship Era (Hart-Davis, 1973), later re-issued as Battleship (Birlinn, 2000)
- Nelson's War (Hart-Davis, 1975), with introduction by Ludovic Kennedy
- The Great Naval Race: Anglo-German Naval Rivalry, 1900–1914 (Hart-Davis,1976)
- Tide of Empires: Decisive Naval Campaigns in the Rise of the West 1481–1654 (Routledge, 1979)
- Rule Britannia: the Victorian and Edwardian Navy (Routledge, 1981)
- Beneath the Houseflag of the P & O: a social history (Hutchinson, 1981)
- Tide of Empires: Decisive Naval Campaigns in the Rise of the West 1654–1763 (Routledge, 1981)
- Armada: a Celebration of the 400th Anniversary of the Defeat of the Spanish Armada (Gollancz, 1988)
- War Beneath the Sea: Submarine Conflict, 1939–1945 (John Murray, 1995)
- Maritime Supremacy and the Opening of the Western Mind: Naval Campaigns that Shaped the Modern World, 1588–1782 (John Murray, 1999)
- Maritime Power and the Struggle for Freedom: Naval Campaigns that Shaped the Modern World, 1788–1851 (John Murray, 2003) Mountbatten Maritime Prize 2003
- Maritime Dominion and the Triumph of the Free World: Naval Campaigns that Shaped the Modern World, 1852–2001 (John Murray, 2009)

Second World War

- Dönitz: the Last Führer (Gollancz, 1984)
- Himmler: Reichsführer-SS (Macmillan, 1990)
- Hess: Flight for the Führer (Weidenfeld, 1991)
- Hess: the Führer's Disciple (Macmillan Papermac, 1993)
- War Beneath the Sea: Submarine Conflict, 1939–1945 (John Murray, 1995)
- Hess, Hitler and Churchill: the real turning point of the Second World War (Icon Books, 2013)
  - U.S. edition Night Flight to Dungavel: Rudolf Hess, Winston Churchill, and the real turning point of WWII (ForeEdge from University Press of New England, 2014)

Novels

- The Lion's Claw (1978)
- The Unquiet Gods (1980)
- Gold Chains of Empire (1982)
- Salt and Steel (1986)

Selected articles

- 'Mystery of the Melanesian' in The Wide World Magazine, December 1959
- 'We Sailed on All Fools' Day' in The Wide World Magazine, January 1960
