= Stanley Lord =

British merchant seaman (1877–1962)

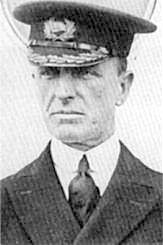
- Lord as captain with the Nitrate Steamship Company, c. 1920
- Born: Stanley Phillip Lord; 13 September 1877; Bolton, Lancashire, England
- Died: 24 January 1962 (aged 84); Wallasey, Cheshire, England
- Burial place: Rake Lane Cemetery, Wallasey, Merseyside, England
- Occupation: Merchant seaman
- Known for: Captain of SS Californian at the time of the sinking of the Titanic
- Spouse: Mabel Henrietta Tutton (m. 1907; died 1957)
- Children: 1

Stanley Phillip Lord (13 September 1877 – 24 January 1962) was a British merchant seaman who was captain of the SS Californian on the night the RMS Titanic sank on 15 April 1912. The ship, which was primarily a freighter that could carry a small number of passengers, has been named as being the unidentified ship that failed to come to the aid of the foundering Titanic.

Lord was born in Bolton, Lancashire, and began his career at sea at the age of thirteen. He quickly moved up the ranks of the merchant navy, earning his certificates, and began working for the Leyland Line in 1900, when they took over Lord's previous company. He got his first commmand in 1906, aged only 28. He became captain of the Californian in 1911. On the eve of the sinking, Captain Lord had stopped the Californian for the night when it had entered an ice field, not far from a ship which was spotted on the horizon around midnight. Over the next few hours, officers on watch reported to Lord about seeing white rockets from the ship, something Lord ascribed to company signals. Lord and the crew of the Californian only became aware of the Titanic disaster the following morning when wireless signals were received from ships nearby informing them of what happened.

At the subsequent inquiries, it came out that a ship had been seen from the Titanic but did not respond to their distress rockets or morse signals. After crewmembers of the Californian spoke to the press about seeing rockets, Lord was subpeonad by the US Senate committee investigating the disaster. The Californian crew were criticised for not rendering timely assistance to the Titanic and both the American and British inquiries concluded Lord was captain of the ship that was closest to the Titanic at the time of its sinking and condemned his failure to respond to the rockets. Lord subsequently lost his position at the Leyland Line but continued serving at sea for the Nitrate Producers Steamship Company, where he remained until his retirement in March 1927. He died in 1962.

After a renewal of interest in the Titanic disaster with the publishing of A Night to Remember by Walter Lord (no relation), Lord sought to have his name cleared with the help of union attorney Leslie Harrison and his son. In subsequent decades, Lord's actions were reevaluated, noting there was little the Californian could have done but still critical of his failure to react to distress signals. As such, his inaction remains controversial. Historians have offered differing opinions on Lord that night, with some defending and others criticising him, resulting in two factions now labelled as "Lordites" or "Anti-Lordites".

== Early life ==
Lord was born on 13 September 1877 in Bolton, Lancashire, England. He began his training at sea when he was thirteen, aboard the barque Naiad, in March 1891. He later obtained his Second Mate's Certificate of competency and served as Second Officer on the barque Lurlei.

In February 1901, at the age of 23, Lord obtained his Master's Certificate, and three months later, obtained his Extra Master's Certificate. He entered the service of the West India and Pacific Steam Navigation Company in 1897. The company was taken over by the Leyland Line in 1900, but Lord continued service with the new company, and was awarded his first command in 1906.

Lord was given command of the SS Californian in 1911.

== Sinking of RMS Titanic ==
=== Communications with Titanic ===
On 14 April 1912, as the Californian approached a large ice pack, Captain Lord decided to stop around 10:21 p.m. (ship's time) and wait for the night. Before turning in for the night, he ordered wireless operator, Cyril Evans, to warn other ships in the area about the ice. Lord asked Evans who was close by to which he said, "Only the Titanic."

At 22:55, chief wireless operator Jack Phillips was busy working Cape Race traffic when Evans cut in and said, "Say old man, we are stopped surrounded by ice." Due to Californian's relative proximity, and the fact that both Evans and Phillips were using spark-gap wireless sets whose signals bled across the spectrum and were impossible to tune out, meant that Evans's signal was strong and loud in Phillips's ears, while the signals from Cape Race were faint to Phillips and inaudible to Evans.

Likely due to Evans' informal sounding message, which had no position nor "MSG" prefix to mark it out as official, Phillips sent back "DDD", telling him to stop transmitting. In the straight forward jargon of wireless operators, Evans interpreted Phillips' reply as "Keep out! I am working Cape Race!" Phillips continued communicating with Cape Race, while Evans listened a while longer before going to bed for the night. Contrary to belief, Evans was not offended. At the British Wreck Commissioner's inquiry, he told Lord Mersey that the comment was not meant as and nor perceived as an insult:

=== Mystery ship ===
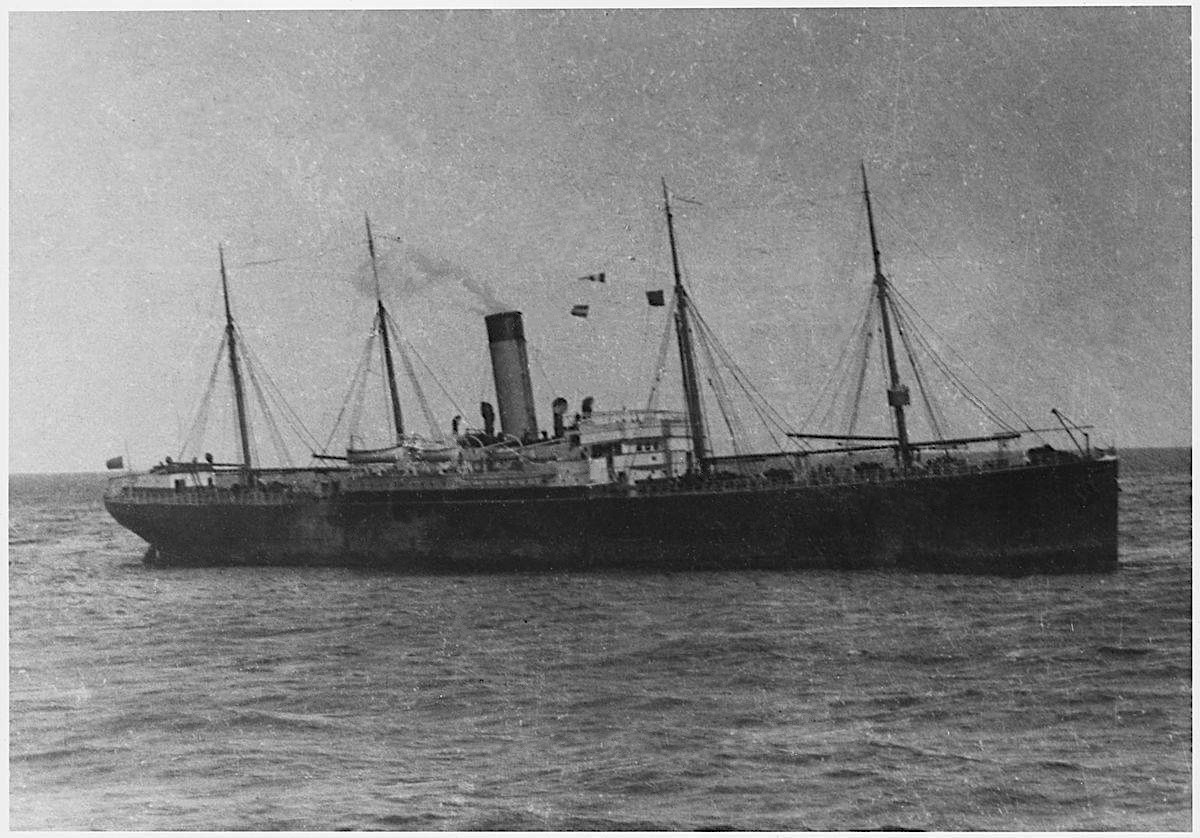
The Californian as photographed by passenger Louis Ogden from the RMS Carpathia on 15 April 1912

At 12:15 a.m., Lord, still in uniform, went to the chart room on the ship's bridge deck to lie down after being on duty for 17 hours. He would be awakened twice during the night. The first time was to be told about the rockets. Over the course of the night, officers on the Californian witnessed eight white rockets fired into the sky above an unknown ship in the distance. The Titanic had begun firing its first rockets about an hour after the iceberg collision when the lights of an unknown ship were seen off her port bow. They were launched every six to seven minutes. When Lord was told about the rockets he replied that they may be "company rockets"; distinct coloured signals which help ships of the same line identify each other. However, he never ordered wireless officer Evans to turn on his set or contact the ship to ask why they were firing signal rockets.

The Titanic's Fourth Officer Joseph Boxhall and Quartermaster George Rowe said they tried to contact the mystery ship with Morse lamp but got no reply nor saw any coherent signals. Meanwhile the Californian 's officers decided they were looking at the flickering lights on the masthead of a ship that had also stopped because of the ice. After the Titanic had gone down at 2:20 a.m., Lord was informed by his officers that they thought the disappearance of lights from the mystery ship indicated it had steamed away.

At 5:30 a.m., on the morning of 15 April 1912, Evans heard the first reports from the SS Frankfurt that the Titanic had sunk. After being notified, Captain Lord immediately ordered the Californian to make steam and head to the last known location of the liner. By 8:45 a.m., his ship had pulled up alongside the Carpathia. It then remained in the area to search for additional bodies after the Carpathia returned to New York with the survivors. After finding nothing, Lord ordered the ship to resume course and headed for Boston.

=== Inquiries ===
Lord during the British inquiry into the Titanic disaster, May 1912.

The following is from Captain Lord's testimony in the US Inquiry on 26 April:

When I came off the bridge, at half past 10, I pointed out to the officer that I thought I saw a light coming along, and it was a most peculiar light, and we had been making mistakes all along with the stars, thinking they were signals. We could not distinguish where the sky ended and where the water commenced. You understand, it was a flat calm. He said he thought it was a star, and I did not say anything more. I went down below. I was talking with the engineer about keeping the steam ready, and we saw these signals coming along, and I said "There is a steamer passing. Let us go to the wireless and see what the news is." But on our way down I met the operator coming, and I said, "Do you know anything?" He said, "The Titanic." So, then, I gave him instructions to let the Titanic know. I said, "This is not the Titanic; there is no doubt about it." She came and lay at half past 11, alongside of us until, I suppose, a quarter past, within 4 miles of us. We could see everything on her quite distinctly, see her lights. We signaled her, at half past 11, with the Morse lamp. She did not take the slightest notice of it. That was between half past 11 and 20 minutes to 12. We signaled her again at 10 minutes past 12, half past 12, a quarter to 1 o'clock. We have a very powerful Morse lamp. I suppose you can see that about 10 miles, and she was about 4 miles off, and she did not take the slightest notice of it. When the second officer came on the bridge, at 12 o'clock, or 10 minutes past 12, I told him to watch that steamer, which was stopped, and I pointed out the ice to him; told him we were surrounded by ice; to watch the steamer that she did not get any closer to her. At 20 minutes to 1 I whistled up the speaking tube and asked him if she was getting any nearer. He said, "No; she is not taking any notice of us." So, I said "I will go and lie down a bit." At a quarter past he said, "I think she has fired a rocket." He said, "She did not answer the Morse lamp and she has commenced to go away from us." I said, "Call her up and let me know at once what her name is. So, he put the whistle back, and, apparently, he was calling. I could hear him ticking over my head. Then I went to sleep.

Lord also testified at the British inquiry into the sinking.

== Personal life ==
Lord was married and had a son. His son, Stanley Tutton Lord (1908–1994), worked as a banker in Liverpool; he never married or had children. He died from natural causes in 1994. In 1965 he wrote a preface to a book by Peter Padfield, The Titanic and the Californian, which supported the case that Lord had been judged unfairly.

Lord's wife, Mabel, died in 1957. He died on 24 January 1962, aged 84, almost half a century after the sinking of the Titanic. He is buried in Rake Lane Cemetery, Wallasey, Merseyside.

== Legacy ==
So far as any negligence of the SS Californian's officers and crew was concerned, the conclusions of both the American and British inquiries seemed to disapprove of Lord's actions, but stopped short of recommending charges. While both inquiries censured Lord, they did not make any recommendations for an official investigation to ascertain if he was guilty of offences under the Merchant Shipping Acts.

Despite this, Lord was dismissed by the Leyland Line in August 1912. In February 1913, with help from a Leyland director who believed he had been unfairly treated, Lord was hired by the Nitrate Producers Steamship Co., where he remained until March 1927, resigning for health reasons.

In 1958, Lord contacted the Mercantile Marine Service Association in Liverpool to clear his name. The association's general secretary, Mr. Leslie Harrison, took up the case for him and petitioned the Board of Trade on his behalf for a re-examination of the facts, but there had been no finding by the time of Lord's death in 1962. In 1965, largely because Lord had offered no new evidence, his petition was rejected, but in the same year Peter Padfield's book The Titanic and the Californian was published, defending Lord's reputation, with a preface by his son Stanley Tutton Lord. This was followed by a second petition, in 1968, which was also rejected.

In 1958 the film A Night To Remember was released, based on a 1955 book of the same title by Walter Lord (no relation). Stanley Lord, now 81 years old, never saw the film, but purportedly read the Liverpool Echo newspaper reviews of the film. Lord was very disappointed; it brought back memories of the Titanic tragedy, and he was upset over his negative portrayal by the Australian-British actor Russell Napier, which depicted him as a captain in his forties, in a warm cabin in bed asleep when Titanic was sinking. In reality, Lord was 34 years old at the time and was asleep in the chart room with his uniform on at the time of the disaster. Lord's son Stanley Tutton Lord saw the film and was upset about how his father was treated after the Titanic tragedy. In 1959, Stanley helped fight to get his father's name cleared from the records of the Titanic disaster. He continued his attempts after his father died in 1962, up until he died in 1994.

The discovery in 1985 of the remains of the Titanic on the sea bed made it clear that the SOS position given after the iceberg collision by the Titanic's fourth officer, Joseph Boxhall, was wrong by thirteen miles. At both of the 1912 inquiries, there had been some conflict about the true position of the ship when it sank. The conclusions of the inquiries discounted the evidence of uncertainty about the position of the Titanic. At the time, some assumed that the position that Lord had given for his ship was incorrect and that he was much closer to the Titanic than he claimed to be. While the entries in the Californian's scrap log (used for recording information before it was written up officially in the ship's logbook) referring to the night in question had mysteriously gone missing, sometimes seen as overwhelming proof that Lord deliberately destroyed evidence to cover his crime of ignoring a distress call, destroying the scrap log records was normal company practice. While modifying the official ship's log or removing pages is a serious violation of maritime law, this was not the case.

A re-appraisal by the British government, instigated informally in 1988 and published in 1992 by the Marine Accident Investigation Branch (MAIB), further implicated the consequences of Lord's inaction. Among its conclusions were that although the Californian was probably out of visual sight, the Titanic's rockets had been sighted by the Californian's crew. Another conclusion stated that it was unrealistic to assume that Lord could have rushed towards the signals and that with the Titanic reporting an incorrect position, the Californian would have arrived at about the same time as the Carpathia and fulfilled a similar role – rescuing those who had escaped. The report was critical of the behaviour of the other officers of the Californian in reaction to the signals. What has never been satisfactorily resolved was why Lord did not simply wake his radio operator and listen for any distress signals.

In his book The Titanic And The Indifferent Stranger, historian Paul Lee noted the lack of reliable witnesses. Those on the Titanic were in the midst of an evacuation, while those on board the Californian had reasons to want to avoid blame. Navigational techniques of the time meant that the Titanic's CQD position being wrong did not necessarily mean that the Californian was farther away, since their position was likely wrong as well (for example, the position of the RMS Carpathia at the time they received the distress call was also incorrectly given). Lee was critical of both Lord and Stone for not reacting appropriately to the rockets, which were, under regulation, understood as being distress signals. He also noted that, even if the rockets did not come from the Titanic but another potential "mystery ship" between them, the Californian was still ignoring some other ship's distress signals. Despite this criticism, Lee did conclude that the Californian probably would not have been able to save many if any additional lives, noting that because it would not have been feasible to bring the ships close enough to have people walk directly from one ship to the other; a rescue by the Californian would still have necessitated lowering the lifeboats. Lee further hypothesized that, given the reluctance of many passengers to leave the ship in the early stages of the evacuation, the sight of an approaching ship might have provided even further discouragement to board the lifeboats, causing more deaths rather than fewer.

== Portrayals ==
- Frederick Tozere (1956) Kraft Television Theatre; A Night to Remember
- Russell Napier (1958) A Night to Remember (British film)
- Gunther Malzacher (1984) Titanic - Nachspiel einer Katastrophe (German TV film)
- Matthew Walker (1996) Titanic (miniseries)
- Jerry August (1998) Titanic: Secrets Revealed (Documentary)
- Bernard Hill (1999) The Titanic Chronicles (Documentary)
- Harry Napier (2012) Titanic: Case Closed (Documentary)
- Stuart Graham (2012) Save Our Souls: The Titanic Inquiry (TV film)
- David Whalen (2024) Unsinkable (Film)
