= William Thomas Turner =

British merchant navy captain (1856–1933)

Captain William Thomas Turner OBE RNR
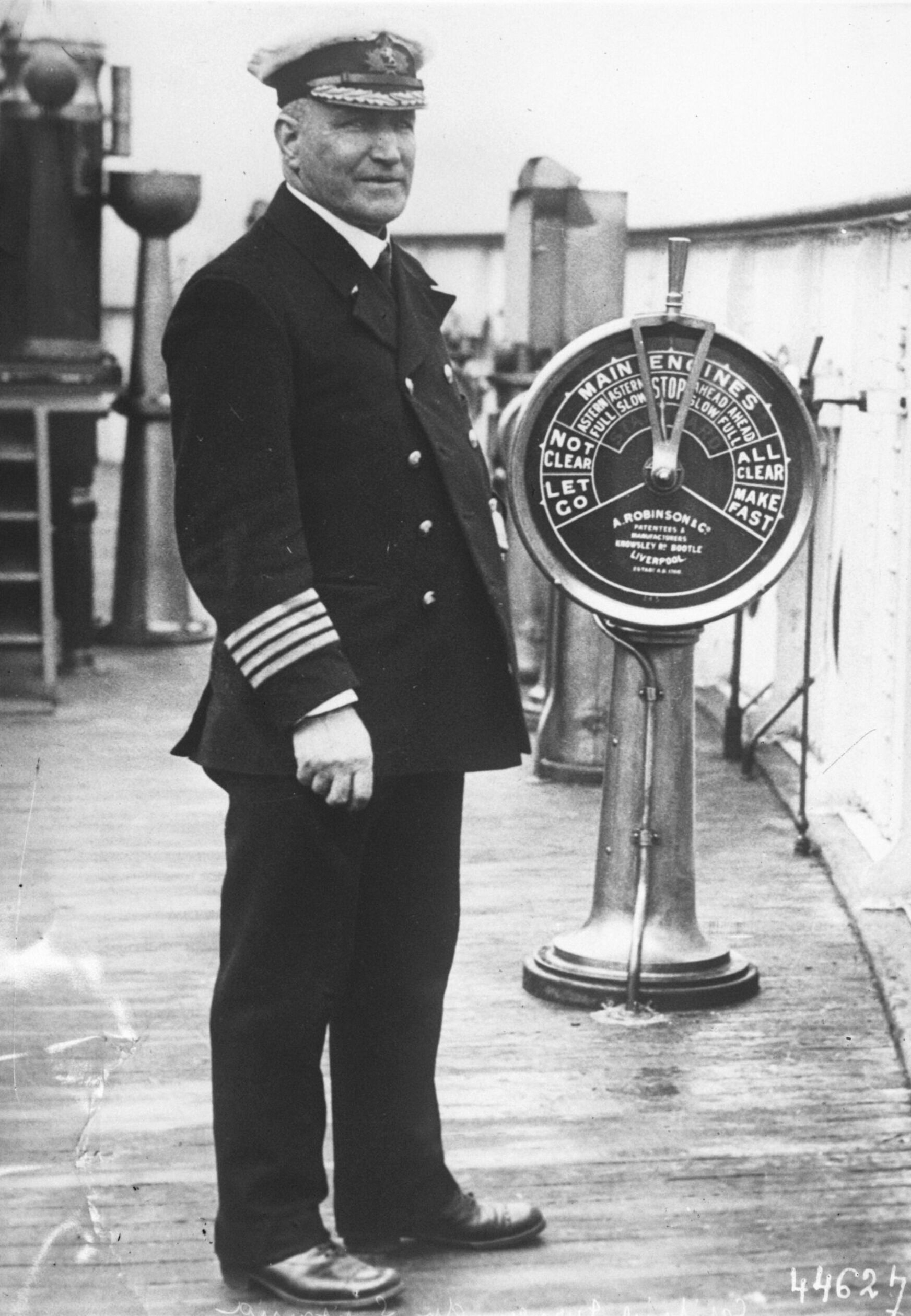
- Turner as captain of RMS Aquitania, 1914
- Born: 23 October 1856; Liverpool, England
- Died: 23 June 1933 (aged 76); Great Crosby, Lancashire, England
- Occupation: Merchant seaman
- Years active: 1864–1919
- Employer: Cunard Line
- Known for: Last captain of RMS Lusitania
- Spouse: Alice Elizabeth Hitching (m. 1883; separation 1903)
- Partner: Mabel Every (1908–1933)
- Children: 2
- Awards: Order of the British Empire; Transport Medal
- Military career
- Allegiance: United Kingdom
- Branch: Royal Naval Reserve
- Service years: 1913–1919
- Rank: Commander
- Conflicts: World War I

Captain William Thomas Turner OBE RNR (23 October 1856 – 23 June 1933) was a British merchant captain. He is best known as the captain of RMS Lusitania when she was sunk by a German torpedo in May 1915.

== Career and honours ==
=== Early life and career ===
Born in Liverpool, England to Charlotte Turner (née Johnson) and Charles Turner, who was a seaman. The younger Turner first set sail aboard the ship Grasmere somewhere between the ages of 8 and 13 (sources vary as to his age). Just like his last voyage on the Lusitania, his first sea voyage also ended in a shipwreck near Ireland, and he swam to the Irish shore to save himself. Turner served under his father's command on Queen of Nations. While best known now for his role in the Lusitania disaster, Turner was an excellent navigator who accomplished several crossings at notable speeds, including Liverpool to New York in 12 days in 1910, and was promoted for his skill despite his unsuitably gruff demeanor around passengers. Turner was said to have referred to passengers as, "a load of bloody monkeys who are constantly chattering".

=== Acts of heroism ===
While appointed to Cherborg, Turner gained recognition for personally rescuing a man and a boy who had fallen into the water after Alice Davies was wrecked in a collision with Cherborg. He again gained fame for rescuing a 14-year-old boy who had fallen off the Alexandra Dock, and was awarded the Liverpool Shipwreck and Humane Society's Silver Medal. He received an illuminated address from the Liverpool Shipwreck and Humane Society for rescuing the crew of Vagne in 1897. Turner received the Transport Medal for outstanding service in 1902 when, as Chief Officer of Umbria, he moved troops to South Africa during the Boer War. Turner received yet another illuminated address from the Liverpool Shipwreck and Humane Society upon rescuing half of the crew of the West Point in 1910.

=== List of notable ships Turner served aboard ===
- Grasmere
- White Star
- Queen of Nations
- Cherbourg
- Star of thee East
- Catalonia
- RMS Umbria
- Aleppo
- RMS Carpathia
- Ivernia
- RMS Caronia
- RMS Mauretania
- RMS Aquitania
- Transylvania
- RMS Lusitania
- Ultonia

=== Career with Cunard ===
Turner joined Cunard Line in 1878 as Fourth Officer, following in his father's footsteps, and left Cunard in 1883 to gain additional experience required for a promotion. Turner gained his captain's licence in 1886, and then rejoined the line in 1889. In 1903, Turner was given his first command, Aleppo. While Cunard initially had concerns about Turner's gruff demeanour and avoidance of passengers, they found to their surprise that passengers actually enjoyed Turner's elusive act and that he was in high demand.

In 1915 A German U-boat sank RMS Lusitania by torpedo. Turner remained on board during the sinking and went down with the ship but was rescued from the water. The Admiralty tried to place serious charges against Turner, blaming him for the sinking. Winston Churchill was directly involved with the case. At the Wreck commissioner's inquiry into the sinking, Turner was exonerated, but the charges haunted him for the rest of his life, and he lived in seclusion.

=== Ivernia ===
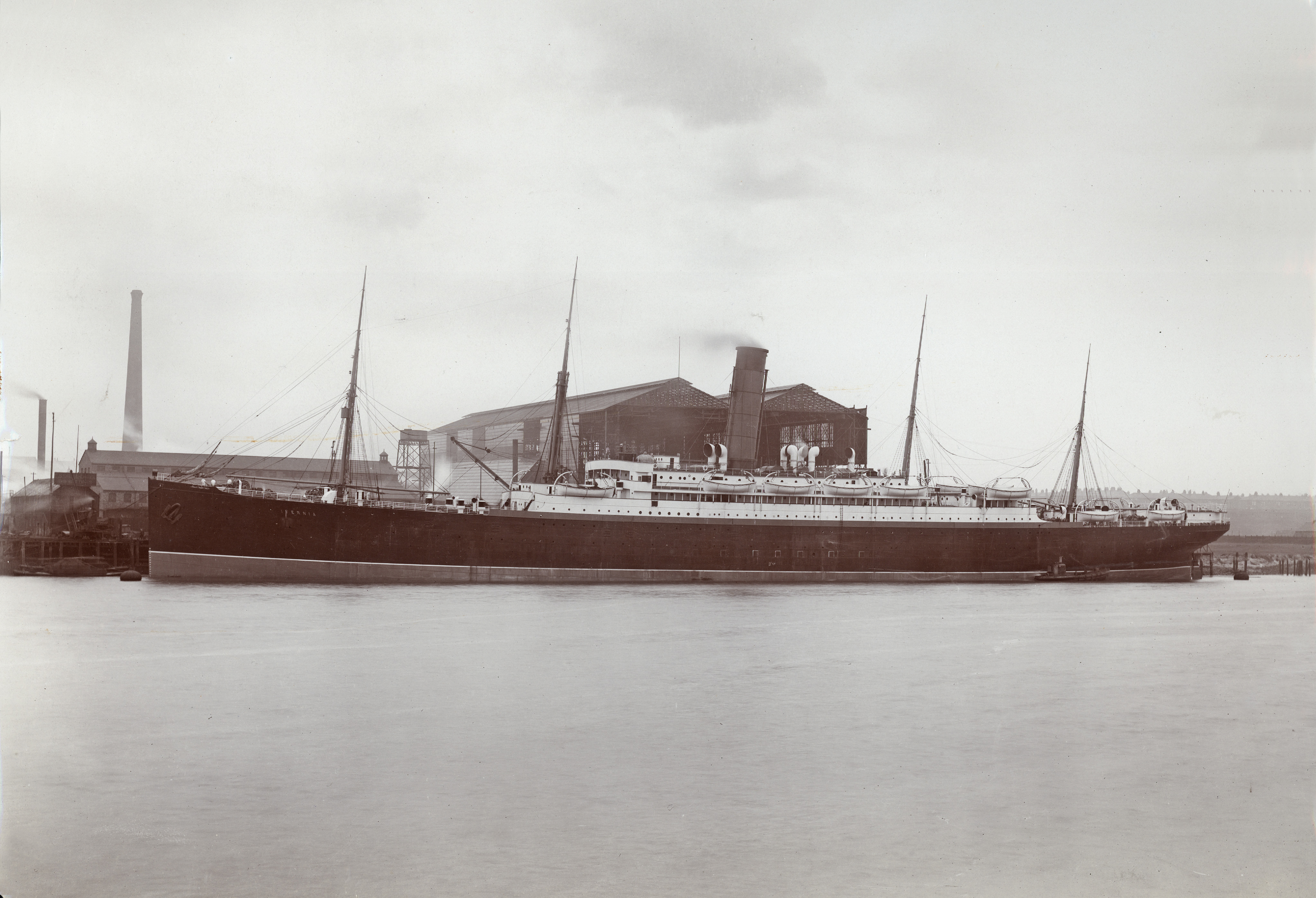
Ivernia, about 1900

In the autumn of 1916, over a year after the sinking of Lusitania, Turner was appointed relieving master of the Cunard Line vessel Ivernia, which the British government had chartered as a troopship. On 1 January 1917, a German U-boat torpedoed the ship in the Mediterranean off the Greek coast, with 2,400 troops aboard. She sank fairly quickly, with a loss of 36 crew members and 84 troops. Once again, Turner survived. This time, The New York Times reported, he remained on the bridge until all aboard had departed in lifeboats and rafts, "before striking out to swim as the vessel went down under his feet."

== Personal life ==
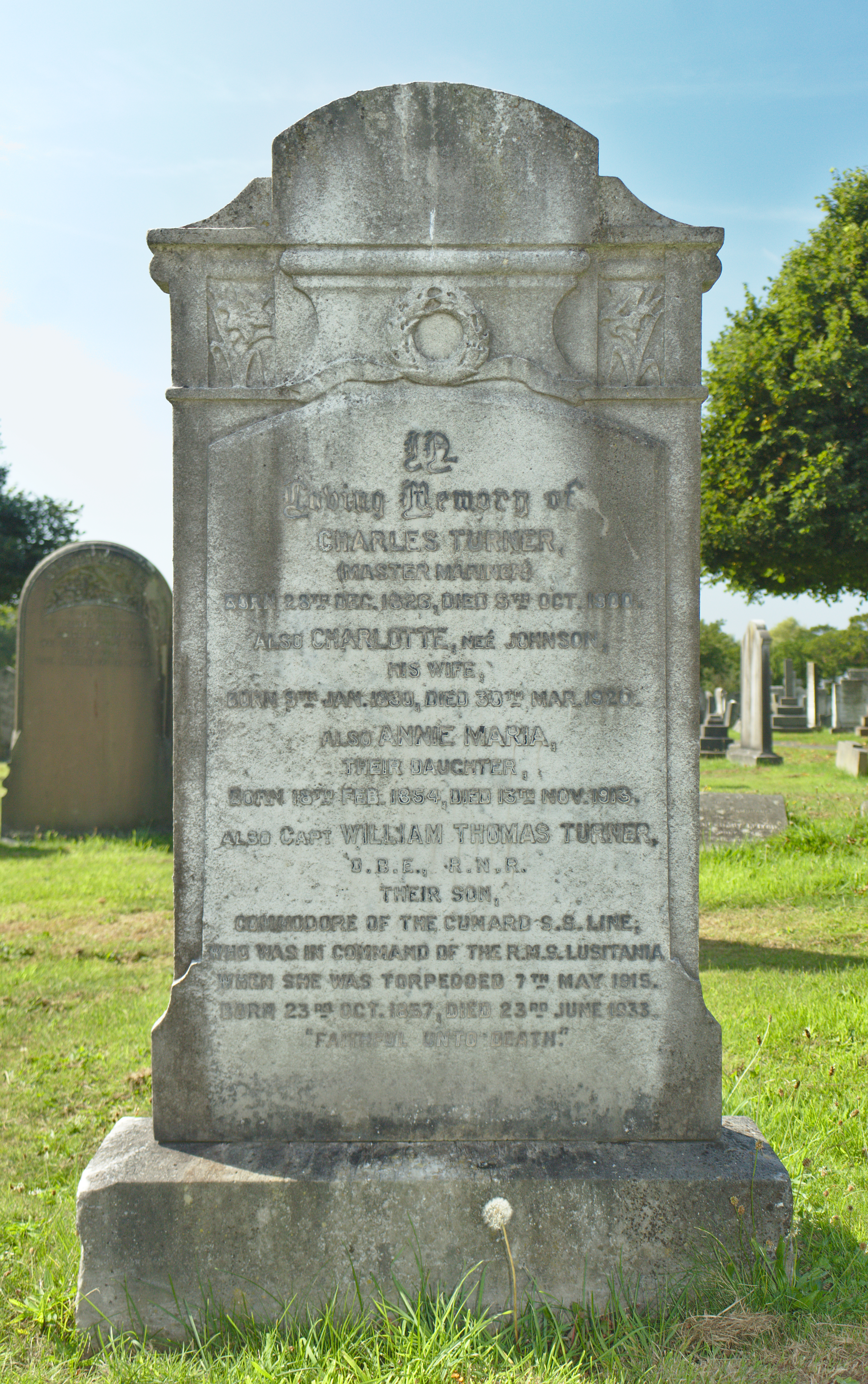
Turner's grave stone in Rake Lane Cemetery

Turner received the nickname "Bowler Bill", for his custom of buying a brand new bowler hat upon taking command of a ship and wearing this hat on ship's business.

Turner married Alice Elizabeth Hitching, on 31 August 1883. They lived together in Manchester and had two sons, Percy Wilfred (born 1885) and Norman Henry (born 1893). Alice moved out in 1903 with Turner's sons, when the couple separated. They remained separated for the rest of their lives but never divorced, and Turner lived with his housekeeper and companion Miss Mabel Every. Alice emigrated with Turner's sons to Australia in 1915, following the Admiralty's inquiry, and subsequently relocated to Canada at an unknown date. Without knowing his sons had relocated to Canada with Alice, Turner went in search of them upon being diagnosed with intestinal cancer. In November 1919, Turner retired, telling Mabel, "All I want now is a quiet life." It was at this time he was awarded the O.B.E. at the behest of the Chairman of the Cunard Line.

Turner died of intestinal cancer on 23 June 1933; he was buried in Rake Lane Cemetery in Wallasey, alongside his parents.

Turner's son, Merchant Navy Able Seaman Percy Wilfred Turner, age 55, was lost on 16 September 1941 on Jedmoor when German submarine U-98 sank it.

== Portrayals ==
- Tudor Owen (No Time Like the Past)
- Kenneth Cranham (Sinking of the Lusitania: Terror at Sea)
- Torin Thatcher (Night Gallery)
