= Changes in safety practices after the sinking of the Titanic =

Maritime policy changes

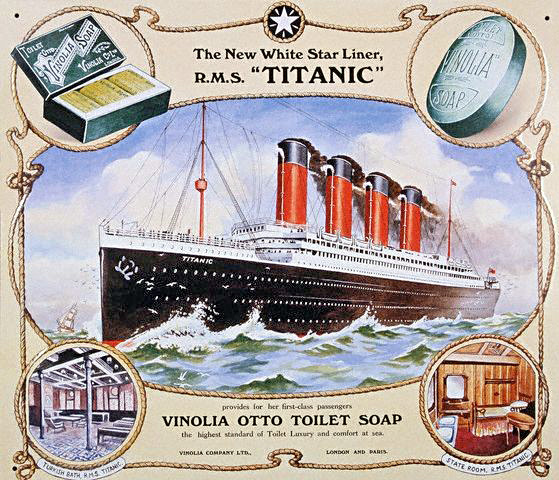
The Titanic

The sinking of the Titanic resulted in a number of changes in safety practices and maritime policy, many of which were based on the reports and recommendations of the American and British inquiries into its sinking.

These changes included an increase in lifeboats and life vests in case of emergency; changes in communication and interpretation of distress signals; the formation and funding of the International Ice Patrol to monitor and report the movements of icebergs in the Atlantic and Arctic oceans; and the refiting of ships to extend the bulkhead height and double bottoms for increased safety.

== Lifeboats ==
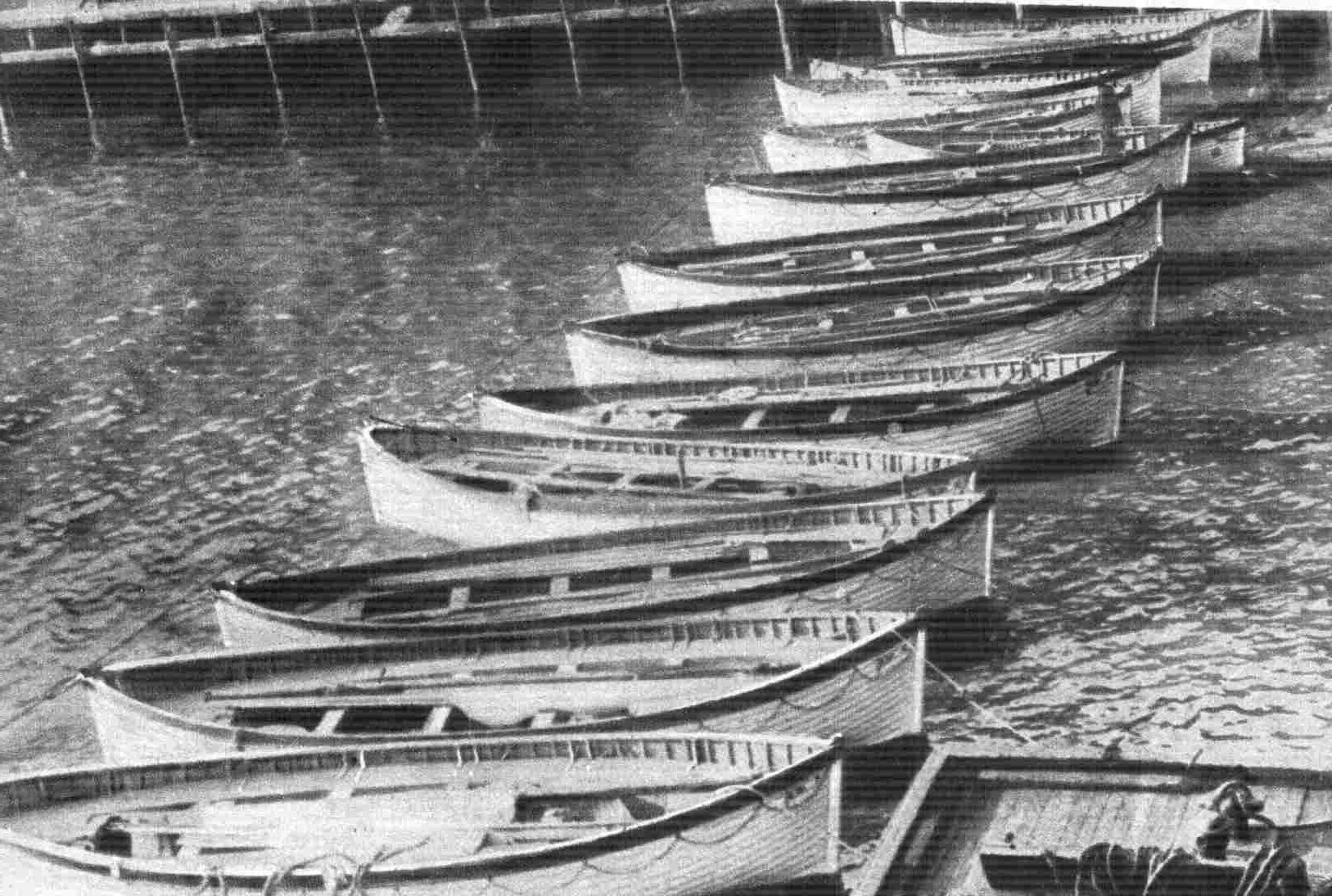
The Titanic's recovered lifeboats

Alexander Carlisle, Harland and Wolff's general manager and chairman of the managing directors, suggested that Titanic use a new, larger type of davit which could give the ship the potential to carry 48 lifeboats; this would have provided enough seats for everyone on board. However, the White Star Line decreed that only 20 lifeboats would be carried, which could accommodate about 38% of those on board when the ship was filled to capacity. At the time, the Board of Trade's regulations stated that British vessels over 10,000 tons (Titanic was just over 46,000) must carry 16 lifeboats with a capacity of 5,500 cubic feet (160 m^{3}), plus enough capacity in rafts and floats for 75% (or 50% in case of a vessel with watertight bulkheads) of that in the lifeboats. Therefore, the White Star Line actually provided more lifeboat accommodation than was legally required. The regulations made no extra provision for larger ships because they had not been changed since 1894, when the largest passenger ship under consideration was only 13,000 tons, and because of the expected difficulty in getting away more than 16 boats in any emergency.

On the night of the sinking, the Titanic's lifeboat complement was made up of three types of boats. The most numerous were the 14 standard wooden lifeboats, each 30 ft (9.1 m) long by 9 ft 1 in (2.77 m) wide, with a capacity of 65 persons each. Forward of them, one on each side of the ship, two smaller emergency boats, 25 ft (7.6 m) long, had a capacity of 40 persons each. Four Engelhardt collapsible lifeboats measuring 27 ft 5 in (8.36 m) long by 8 ft (2.4 m) wide had a capacity of 47 persons each; they had canvas sides, and could be stowed almost flat, taking up a comparatively small amount of deck space. Two were stowed port and starboard on the roof of the officers' quarters, at the foot of the first funnel, while the other two were stowed port and starboard alongside the emergency lifeboat cutters.

After the Titanic disaster, recommendations were made by both the British and American Boards of Inquiry stating, in part, that ships would carry enough lifeboats for those aboard, mandated lifeboat drills would be implemented, lifeboat inspections would be conducted, etc. Many of these recommendations were incorporated into the International Convention for the Safety of Life at Sea passed in 1914.

== 24-hour radio watch and distress rockets ==
Following the inquiries, the United States government passed the Radio Act of 1912. This Act, along with the International Convention for the Safety of Life at Sea, stated that radio communications on passenger ships would be operated 24 hours along with a secondary power supply so as not to miss distress calls. Also, the Radio Act of 1912 required ships to maintain contact with vessels in their vicinity as well as coastal onshore radio stations.

In addition, it was agreed in the International Convention for the Safety of Life at Sea that the firing of red rockets from a ship must be interpreted as a sign of the need for help. This decision was based on the fact that the rockets launched from the Titanic prior to sinking were interpreted with ambiguity by the freighter SS Californian. Officers on the deck of the Californian had seen rockets fired from an unknown liner yet surmised that they could possibly be "company" or identification signals, used to signal to other ships. At the time of the sinking, aside from distress situations, it was commonplace for ships without wireless radio to use a combination of rockets and Roman candles to identify themselves to other liners. Once the Radio Act of 1912 was passed it was agreed that rockets at sea would be interpreted as distress signals only, thus removing any possible misinterpretation from other ships.

== International Ice Patrol ==
After the Titanic disaster, the United States Navy assigned the Scout Cruisers USS Chester and USS Birmingham to patrol the Grand Banks for the remainder of 1912. In 1913, the U.S. Navy could not spare ships for this purpose, so the Revenue Cutter Service (forerunner of the United States Coast Guard) assumed responsibility, assigning the Cutters Seneca and Miami to conduct the patrol.

The Titanic disaster led to the convening of the first International Convention for the Safety of Life at Sea (SOLAS) in London, on 12 November 1913. On 30 January 1914, a treaty was signed by the conference that resulted in the formation and international funding of the International Ice Patrol, an agency of the United States Coast Guard that to the present day monitors and reports on the location of North Atlantic Ocean icebergs that could pose a threat to transatlantic sea traffic.

In the mid-20th century, ice patrol aircraft became the primary ice reconnaissance method with surface patrols phased out except during unusually heavy ice years or extended periods of reduced visibility. Use of the oceanographic vessel continued until 1982, when the Coast Guard's sole remaining oceanographic ship, USCGC Evergreen, was converted to a medium endurance cutter. Aircraft have distinct advantages for ice reconnaissance, providing much greater coverage in a shorter period of time.

== Ship design changes ==
Following the Titanic disaster, ships were refitted for increased safety. For example, the double bottoms of many existing ships, including the RMS Olympic, were extended up the sides of their hulls, their waterlines, to give them double hulls. Another refit that many ships underwent were changes to the height of the bulkheads. The bulkheads on the Titanic extended 10 feet (3.0 m) above the load line. After the Titanic sank, the bulkheads on other ships were extended higher to make the compartments fully watertight.
