= Rake Lane Cemetery =

Cemetery in Merseyside, England

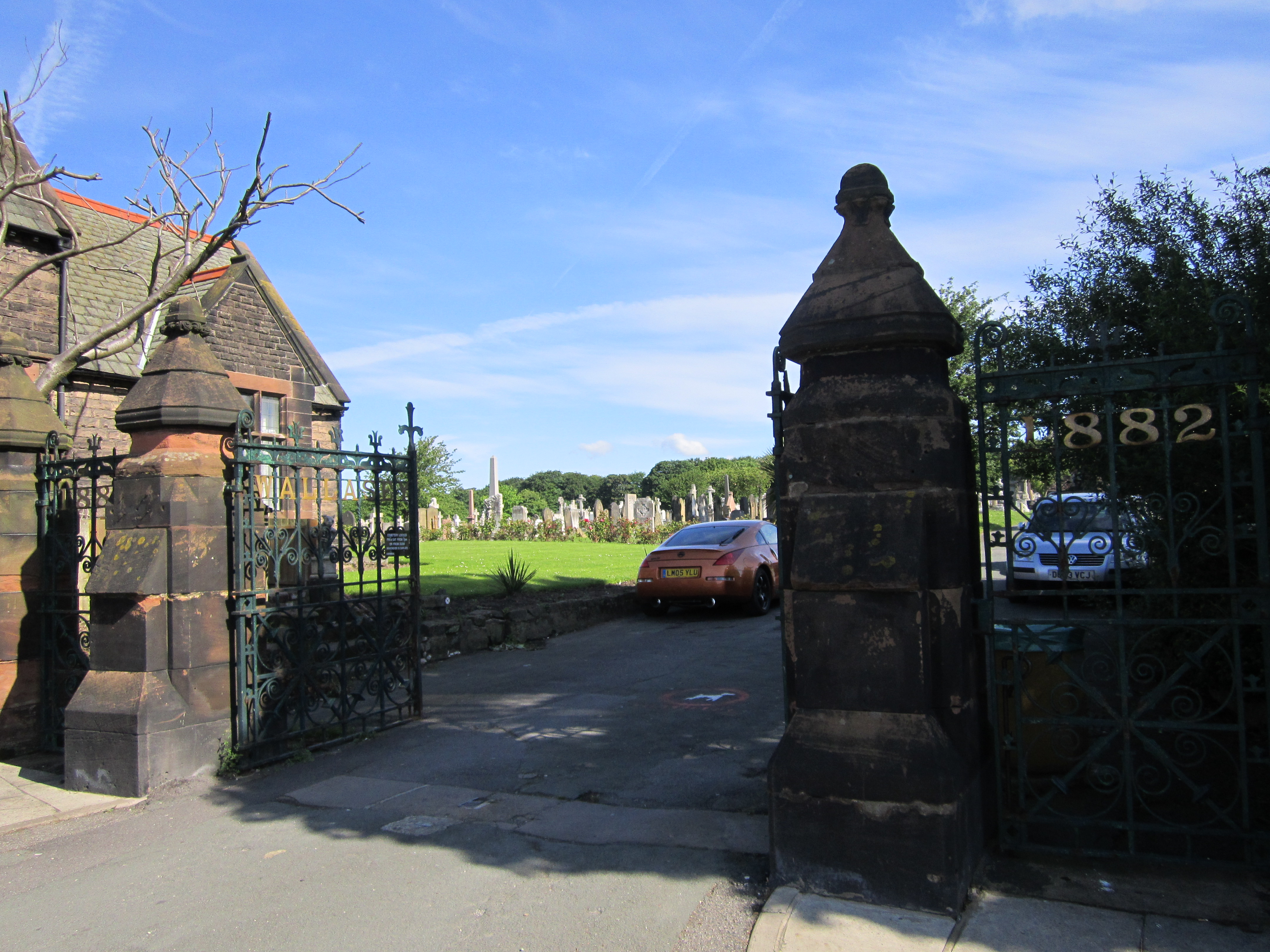
- Interactive map of Rake Lane Cemetery

Details
- Established: 1883
- Location: Rake Lane, Wallasey, Merseyside, England
- Country: United Kingdom
- Coordinates: 53.42562°N 3.04375°W
- Find a Grave: Rake Lane Cemetery

Rake Lane Cemetery, also called Wallasey Cemetery, is a cemetery in Wallasey, Metropolitan Borough of Wirral, Merseyside, England. It was opened in 1883 and notably contains a large number of monuments and graves connected with early 20th-century maritime disasters, including the sinkings of the Titanic and the Lusitania.

== Notable burials ==
- Captain William Thomas Turner, last captain of the RMS Lusitania.
- Captain Stanley Lord, captain of the SS Californian the night of the sinking of the RMS Titanic
- Robert Leith, last chief wireless operator and survivor of the sinking of RMS Lusitania
- Ray Holmes, Royal Air Force pilot, veteran of the Battle of Britain
- Arthur Johnson, footballer
- Sarah Agnes Stap, senior stewardess aboard RMS Titanic
- Seven victims of the 1939 Liverpool Pilot boat disaster

== War graves ==
The cemetery contains the war graves of 259 Commonwealth service personnel of both World Wars. Those whose graves could not be marked by headstones are listed on a Screen Wall memorial near the Cross of Sacrifice.
