= Charles Alfred Bartlett =

British merchant seaman and navy officer

Commodore Charles Alfred Bartlett CB CBE RD RNR
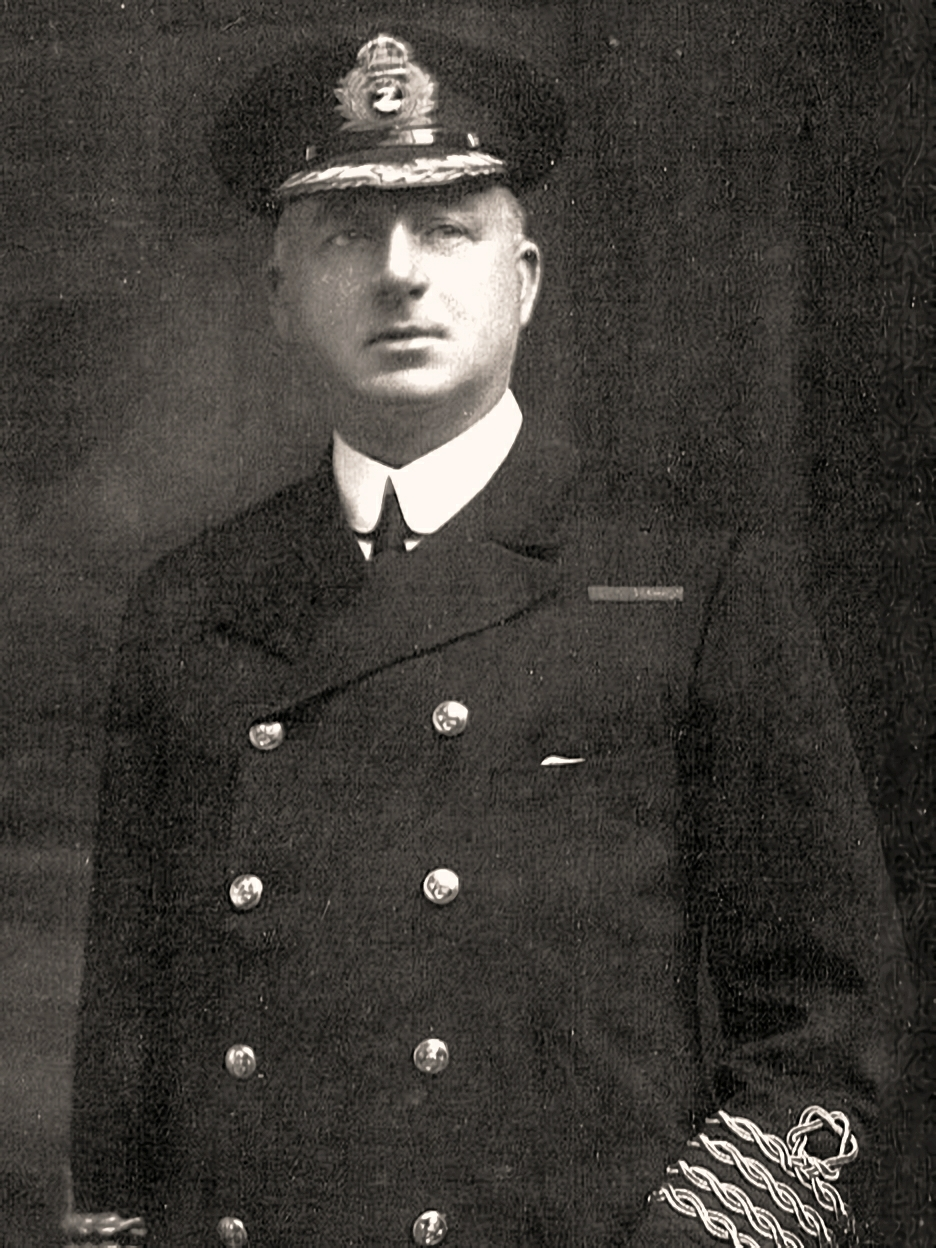
- Born: 21 August 1868; London, United Kingdom
- Died: 15 February 1945 (aged 76); Waterloo, Lancashire, United Kingdom
- Other name: Iceberg Charlie
- Occupations: Merchant seaman; Naval officer
- Years active: 1888–1931
- Employers: British-India Steam Navigation Company; White Star Line
- Known for: Captain of HMHS Britannic
- Title: Commodore of the White Star Line
- Spouse: Edith Ellis (m. 1898)
- Children: 2
- Parent(s): Ellen Bartlett; Captain Sir John Sydney Webb
- Military career
- Allegiance: United Kingdom
- Branch: Royal Naval Reserve
- Rank: Captain
- Conflicts: World War I
- Awards: Reserve Decoration

Commodore Charles Alfred Bartlett CB CBE RD RNR (21 August 1868 – 15 February 1945) was a British merchant navy captain and Royal Naval Reserve officer who became a commodore of the White Star Line. Nicknamed "Iceberg Charlie" for his reputation as a cautious navigator, he is best known as the captain of the hospital ship HMHS Britannic, which sank in the Aegean Sea on 21 November 1916.

== Early life ==
Bartlett was born in London on 21 August 1868. According to the auction house Spink & Son and a later newspaper profile, he was born outside marriage to Ellen Bartlett, from a family of trawlermen in Brixham, Devon, and Captain Sir John Sydney Webb.

According to a biographical profile compiled by Remco Hillen and Michail Michailakis, Bartlett was approximately 1.80 m (5 ft 11 in) tall and had blue-grey eyes.

He was apprenticed aboard the barque Airlie of D. Bruce & Co. and subsequently spent six years with the British-India Steam Navigation Company. In 1893 he received a commission as a sub-lieutenant in the Royal Naval Reserve, and he joined the White Star Line the following year.

== Personal life and family ==
In 1898, Bartlett married Edith Ellis, known as "Edie", who was from Great Yarmouth, Norfolk. A later war-graves record identifies his wife as Edith Bartlett (née Ellis) and records the family's address as "Deepdene", Waterloo, Liverpool.

Their only son, Charles Sydney Ellis Bartlett, served as a midshipman in the Royal Navy aboard HMS Goliath. He was killed aged 15 on 13 May 1915, when the battleship was torpedoed in the Dardanelles. His name is recorded on the Chatham Naval Memorial.

The couple also had a daughter, Eileen Bartlett, who was identified as the mother of their grandson, Alasdair Fairbairn, in a later community biography.

After his retirement, Bartlett and Edith spent time boating on the Norfolk Broads, keeping boats at Horning Ferry. In a 2012 newspaper interview, his grandson Alasdair Fairbairn recalled visiting Bartlett at his home in Crosby during the Second World War.

== Early career and White Star Line ==
Bartlett became fourth officer aboard the White Star liner Germanic in 1894. He rose through the ranks and received his first command in 1903, as captain of the cargo ship Armenian, operated by the Leyland Line.

He later commanded several passenger liners, including Germanic, Victorian, Canopic, Gothic, Republic, Cymric, Romanic and Cedric. His reputation for taking precautions against ice, including changing course to avoid suspected hazards, earned him the nickname "Iceberg Charlie".

== Titanic inquiry ==
In January 1912, Bartlett became the White Star Line's marine superintendent at Liverpool. His duties concerned the manning, upkeep and operation of the company's vessels, and he was involved in arrangements for RMS Titanic's maiden voyage.

After Titanic sank in April 1912, Bartlett testified at the British Wreck Commissioner's inquiry. His evidence addressed the composition of the crew, lifeboat arrangements and shipboard safety procedures. In his testimony he confirmed that he held a master's certificate and was a commander in the Royal Naval Reserve.

== First World War ==
At the outbreak of the First World War, Bartlett commanded the armed yacht Verona, employed on patrol duties in the North Sea. He served as an acting commodore in the Royal Naval Reserve and was appointed a Companion of the Order of the Bath.

== Command of HMHS Britannic ==
Bartlett was appointed captain of HMHS Britannic, the third of the White Star Line's Olympic-class liners. Requisitioned in 1915, the ship was converted into a hospital ship for wartime service in the eastern Mediterranean.

On 23 December 1915, Britannic departed Liverpool under Bartlett's command for Mudros on the Greek island of Lemnos. She completed five hospital-ship voyages before her final sailing, transporting more than 10,000 sick and wounded servicemen to Britain.

== Sinking of HMHS Britannic ==
On 12 November 1916, Bartlett departed Southampton aboard Britannic on her sixth voyage, bound for Mudros. Following a stop at Naples, she departed on 19 November. On the morning of 21 November, near the Greek island of Kea, an explosion struck the ship at approximately 8:12 a.m. The loss has generally been attributed to a mine laid by a German submarine.

Bartlett ordered distress signals to be sent and attempted to bring the damaged vessel towards Kea to beach her. As Britannic continued moving, two lifeboats were lowered into the water and drawn into the ship's exposed, still-turning propellers, causing numerous deaths.

Bartlett ordered the engines stopped and, at approximately 8:35 a.m., ordered the ship abandoned. He remained on the bridge during the evacuation and entered the water as Britannic sank at approximately 9:07 a.m., 55 minutes after the explosion. He survived and continued to assist with rescue operations.

Thirty people died in the sinking. The Western Front Association identifies the propeller accidents involving the lifeboats as the principal cause of the fatalities.

== Later career and death ==
Bartlett returned to his shore duties with the White Star Line after the loss of Britannic. He subsequently served as a Royal Naval Reserve aide-de-camp to King George V and was appointed a Commander of the Order of the British Empire in 1921.

He retired on 31 December 1931 as a White Star Line commodore. He died on 15 February 1945, aged 76, in a nursing home in Waterloo, near Liverpool.

== In popular culture ==
Bartlett is fictionalised as "Barrett", portrayed by John Rhys-Davies in the 2000 Fox Family Channel movie Britannic. Bartlett is portrayed by Stephen Oliver in the 2017 historical docudrama The Mystery Of The Britannic.
