= SS Catalonia =

Cargo passenger liner built in 1881

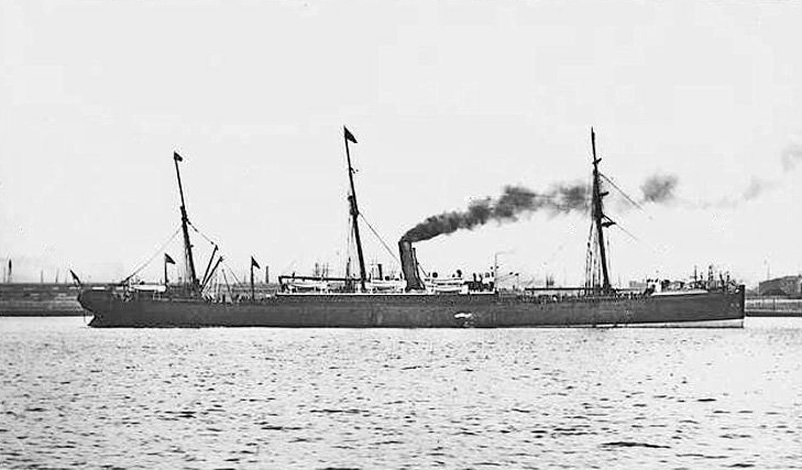
- SS Catalonia under steam

History
- Name: SS Catalonia
- Namesake: Catalonia
- Owner: Cunard Steamship Company Ltd, Liverpool
- Builder: J. & G. Thomson & Co, Clydebank
- Yard number: 180
- Launched: 14 May 1881
- Fate: Scrapped in 1901

General characteristics
- Tonnage: 4,841 gross register tons (GRT); 3,093 net register tons (NRT)
- Length: 429.6 ft (130.9 m)
- Beam: 43 ft (13 m)
- Depth: 18.7 ft (5.7 m)
- Propulsion: C2cyl (51&88x60in), 600hp, 1 screw

SS Catalonia was a cargo passenger vessel built in 1881 and owned by the Cunard Line.

== History ==
The SS Catalonia was built in 1881 in Glasgow by J. & G. Thomson & Co. The Cunard Line returned the SS Abyssinia after her last voyage in 1880 as payment toward the building of the SS Catalonia and the SS Servia. SS Catalonia was launched on 14 May 1881 and began her maiden voyage on 6 August, sailing from Liverpool to Queenstown to New York City. Until 1899, the ship operated between Liverpool and Boston, with the exception of two other trips to New York (besides the maiden voyage). The ship measured 429.6 feet by 43 feet with 4,481 gross tonnage and could carry 200 first-class passengers and 1,500 third-class passengers.

== Wreck ==
On 7 May 1888 the steamer struck a rock and was damaged at Mizen Head, off the coast of Ireland. She suffered damage to her stem and underwent repairs for eight days following the incident.

On 20 October 1897 Catalonia rescued the crew of the fishing vessel Vague which was sinking off the Grand Banks of Newfoundland. The Liverpool Shipwreck and Humane Society awarded a Silver Medal to Captain Thomas Stephens for having, during a heavy gale, rescued the crew, 21 in number, of the French schooner "La Vague".

== Service during the Second Boer War ==
The ship was requisitioned for use in the Second Boer War from 1899 to 1900, and was captained by both James Clayton Barr and William Thomas Turner during the course of the war. She may have been used as a floating prison for Boers during the war. The vessel arrived at Genoa for scrapping on 24 May 1901.
