= Cyril Furmstone Evans =

British telegraphist (1892–1959)

Cyril Furmstone-Evans
- Born: c. March 1892; Croydon, Surrey, England
- Died: c. July 1959 (aged 67)
- Occupation: Wireless operator
- Employer: Marconi International Marine Communication Company
- Known for: Wireless operator of SS Californian during the sinking of RMS Titanic

Cyril Furmstone-Evans (born Cyril Furmstone Evans; 1892 – 1959) was a British wireless telegraphist who was sole operator aboard the SS Californian the night the RMS Titanic struck an iceberg and sank in the early hours of 15 April 1912.

Earlier, on 14 April, Evans had sent an ice report to the Titanic and called the ship up again around 11:00 pm. During the sinking, when Titanic was sending distress signals and the ship was firing rockets, he was off duty, having turned in around 11:30 pm. He was not woken up by the crew until hours after the disaster occurred.

Evans was subsequently called to testify at both the American and British inquiries into the disaster. Among other changes, the disaster and inquiries led to the policy of 24-hour watches being mandated aboard ships to prevent any ship from missing a distress call.

== Early life ==
Not much is known about Evans' early life. He was born in 1892 in Croydon, Surrey, and joined the Marconi Company in 1911 after going to the British School of Telegraphy, along with Harold Bride. His first assignment was aboard the RMS Cedric where he made one voyage, before he was transferred to the SS Californian which had recently been installed with a wireless.

== Sinking of RMS Titanic ==
In April 1912, when Titanic embarked on her maiden voyage, Evans was making his third voyage on the Californian, under Captain Stanley Lord, westbound for Boston. He was the sole wireless operator on board.

In the late afternoon of 14 April 1912, Evans first made contact with the RMS Titanic, the newest White Star Line ship, exchanging "time rushes" – time of day and position as well as a way of making ships known they were within wireless range. At the direction of Captain Lord, Evans sent an Master Service Gram (MSG) to the SS Antillian, another Leyland liner. On the Titanic, second wireless operator Harold Bride overheard this message, taking it down and delivering it to the bridge. Shortly after the exchange with Antillian, Evans called up Bride and offered him the same message with the prefix SG ice reports, meaning Service Gram, a prefix used to denote business between the wireless operators. Bride signalled back, "It's alright OM, I heard you send to the Antillian."

Later that night, Evans was on duty aboard the Californian when Captain Lord entered the wireless operator's cabin and informed him that they had stopped because of ice in the vicinity and asked him what ships were in the area. Evans responded that only the Titanic was in range. Lord ordered him to advise the large steamer that they had stopped for the night. At the time Titanic's chief wireless operator, Jack Phillips, was busy clearing a backlog of passengers' messages with the wireless station at Cape Race, Newfoundland, 500 miles (800 km) away. Evans sent an informal message of "Say old man, we are stopped and surrounded by ice." Due to the proximity of the two ships, the signal was heard very strongly on Titanic and drowned out a separate message Phillips had been in the process of receiving from Cape Race, prompting Phillips to tell Evans to stop transmitting with the signal "DDD" which Evans interpretted as: "Keep out; I am working Cape Race."

Contrary to common belief, Evans was not offended nor did he take the common code for "stop transmitting" to be an insult; at the British Wreck Commissioner's inquiry, Evans told the Viscount Mersey:

Lord Mersey: "In ordinary Marconi practice is that a common thing to be asked?"
Evans: "Yes. And you do not take it as an insult or anything like that."

Evans had not prefixed the message with the letters "MSG" or "SG" and had also not provided the ship's position. He did not attempt to send the message again. Instead, he listened in for a while before he switched off his wireless equipment and went to bed.

In the early morning hours of 15 April 1912, Phillips and Bride began to send out CQD and SOS distress calls on the orders of Titanic Captain Edward Smith. Several ships responded immediately, including RMS Carpathia which was seemingly the closest ship to the stricken liner but was 4 hours away. The Californian was much closer to Titanic but, by then, Evans had turned in. (Note: The Californian was not the only ship close to the Titanic whose operator was off-duty. Donald Sutherland, operator aboard SS Parisian, had also shut down for the night, though the Parisian was much further away.) Although Lord's officers informed him of a ship firing rockets which had stopped and seemingly looked "queer", neither Lord nor Herbert Stone, the officer on watch, thought to wake Evans. Instead, Lord ordered Stone to try and communicate with ship via Morse lamp.

Evans was woken up by Chief Officer George Stewart around 5:30 AM and who told him, "There is a ship that has been firing rockets in the night. Please see if there is anything the matter." He learned via wireless what had happened to Titanic.

Evans subsequently spent the remainder of the morning talking with the SS Frankfurt and SS Birma. He also attempted to establish communication with the Carpathia when they got to the scene of the wreck but was unable to as Harold Cottam, the ship's operator, was attempting to communicate with the RMS Baltic. Evans subsequently received a rebuke from Marconi travelling supervisor Gilbert Balfour, aboard the RMS Baltic, for constantly jamming communications by chatting.

=== Inquiries ===
Upon arrival in Boston, after the knowledge came out that rockets had been seen from the Californian from the ship's donkeyman Ernest Gill, Evans, along with Gill and Captain Lord, was summoned to give evidence at the American inquiry. He would later testify at the British inquiry, regarding his communications with Titanic.

The fact that the SS Californian, which was much closer to the Titanic than the Carpathia missed the ship's distress calls entirely because Evans was asleep, added to the evidence for consistent safety measures regarding wireless and led to the Radio Act of 1912, requiring all ships to man wireless distress frequencies around the clock.

== Later life ==
Evans continued his service with the Marconi Company until retiring as a Manager Engineer in 1957. Around the mid 1920s, he had his middle and last name hyphenated into "Furmstone-Evans" for family reasons. He eventually married. Soon after retirement, Evans died suddenly as a result of coronary thrombosis in July 1959, and was survived by his widow.

== Cultural portrayals ==
In the 1958 film A Night to Remember, Evans was portrayed by Geoffrey Bayldon. In a deleted scene of the 1997 film Titanic, he was portrayed by Adam Barker, son of comedian Ronnie Barker, in a deleted scene, along with Third Officer Charles Groves of the Californian.

== Bibliography ==
- Marcus, Geoffrey (1969). The Maiden Voyage. New York: The Viking Press.
- Hughes, Michael; Bosworth, Katherine (2012). Titanic Calling: Wireless Communications During the Great Disaster. Bodleian Library, University of Oxford. ISBN 978-1851243778.
- Halpern, Samuel (2011). Report into the Loss of the SS Titanic: A Centennial Reappraisal. The History Press. ISBN 978-0752462103.
