= Harold Cottam =

Wireless operator on the RMS Carpathia (1891–1984)

Harold Thomas Cottam
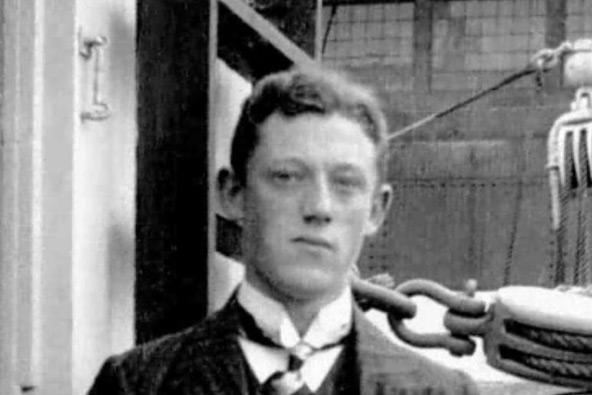
- Cottam in 1912
- Born: 27 January 1891; Southwell, Nottinghamshire, England
- Died: 30 May 1984 (aged 93); Lowdham, Nottinghamshire, England
- Occupation: Wireless telegraphist
- Employer: Marconi International Marine Communication Company
- Spouse: Elsie Jean Shepperson (m. 1922)
- Children: 4

Harold Thomas Cottam (27 January 1891 – 30 May 1984) was a British wireless operator on RMS Carpathia, who received the distress call from the sinking RMS Titanic on 15 April 1912.

Cottam was the sole operator aboard Carpathia during that voyage. He was about to turn in when he called up the Titanic to offer a batch of telegrams when the foundering ship responded with a distress call. Cottam promptly took the message to the officer of the watch who in turn took it to Captain Arthur Rostron. He spent the next two days with no sleep, handling wireless traffic. He was eventually joined by Titanic's surviving operator Harold Bride who relieved and assisted Cottam till the ship arrived in New York with the survivors. Cottam later testified at both the inquiries into the sinking, and was awarded for his actions, along with the rest of the crew of Carpathia.

Following the Titanic disaster, Cottam remained as a wireless operator till 1922, serving in World War I. He retired from seafaring after marriage and worked as a travelling salesman. He died in 1984, aged 93.

== Early life and career ==
Cottam was born on 27 January 1891 in Southwell, Nottinghamshire, to William Cottam and his wife Jane, the eldest of five siblings. He had four younger brothers. He attended Southwell Minster Grammar School. At 17, Cottam left home to study eleven months at the British School of Telegraphy in London, becoming the school's youngest graduate in 1908.

Afterward, he obtained a posting with the Marconi Company as second wireless operator on RMS Empress of Ireland, sailing between Liverpool and Montreal, Canada. He was subsequently assigned to the Seaforth wireless station for over a year before being sent back to sea aboard the SS Medic on which he made two voyages from Liverpool to Sydney, Australia.

In February 1912, Cottam joined the RMS Carpathia as the ship's sole wireless operator. With the ship, he made his first visit to New York City in April 1912.

== RMS Titanic disaster ==
=== Initial communications and rescue ===
On the night of 14 April 1912, Cottam was on Carpathia's bridge, reporting the day's communications, thus missing Titanic's first distress calls shortly after midnight. Afterward, he listened to the receiver before going to bed, waiting for a confirmation of that afternoon's communication with SS Parisian. While waiting, he received messages from Cape Cod wireless station, stating they had private traffic for Titanic. Because Carpathia was one of the nearest ship to Cape Cod which was out of range of the Titanic, he called them up and offered to transmit the traffic through Carpathia.

About ten minutes after Titanic first began transmitting CQD, the wireless distress signal, Cottam relayed Cape Cod's message to Titanic. In reply, he received a distress call from Titanic's wireless operator Jack Phillips: "Come at once. We have struck a berg. It's a CQD, old man." To Cottam's question whether it was serious, Phillips reportedly replied, "Yes it's a CQD old man. Here's the position, report it, and get here as soon as you can."

At the Senate inquiry, Captain Arthur Rostron stated:

"The whole thing was absolutely providential. I will tell you this, that the wireless operator was in his cabin, at the time, not on official business at all, but just simply listening as he was undressing. He was unlacing his boots at the time. He had this apparatus on his ear, and the message came. That was the whole thing. In 10 minutes, maybe he would have been in bed, and we would not have heard the messages."

Cottam took the message and coordinates to the bridge where First Officer Horace Dean was on watch. According to Cottam in 1956, the officer on watch was slow to respond to the news. Cottam did not mention this point in either inquiry in 1912, nor in the news story he gave to The New York Times immediately upon landing in New York. Rostron also does not mention it, testified that both Cottam and Dean came to wake him Researcher Samuel Halpern states that if there was any delay, it was likely because of bridge protocols and that Dean was probably handing over the watch the junior officer, in which time Cottam ran ahead to inform the Captain, with Dean right behind him.

Rostron immediately "gave the order to turn the ship around," likely to First Officer Dean, and then "asked the operator if he was absolutely sure it was a distress signal from the Titanic." Cottam said that he had "received a distress signal from the Titanic, requiring immediate assistance," gave Titanic's position, and said that "he was absolutely certain of the message." Whilst dressing, Rostron set a course for Titanic, and sent for the chief engineer and told "him to call another watch of stokers and make all possible speed to the Titanic, as she was in trouble."

Cottam, meanwhile, messaged Titanic that Carpathia was "coming as quickly as possible and expect to be there within four hours." Second Officer Bisset writes that Cottam refrained from sending more signals after this, trying to keep the air clear for Titanic's distress signals. However, Cottam testified that while Carpathia sped to Titanic's position, he was kept busy relaying messages from other ships in the area that Phillips was having difficulty hearing because of noise of steam being vented from the sinking ship as well as constantly dwindling power. He also delivered updates to the bridge.

Around 1:45 a.m., Cottam received Titanic's final intelligible message: "Come as quickly as possible, old man, the engine room is filling up to the boilers." He replied that "all our boats were ready and we were coming as hard as we could come" but received no further response. The British Wreck Commissioner's inquiry found that other ships in the area continued to hear broken or unintelligible CQD and SOS calls from Titanic after the last message Cottam received, but all signals cut off abruptly at 2:17 a.m., three minutes before Titanic disappeared under the water. Despite receiving no reply, Cottam continued to update Titanic on Carpathia's progress, instructing the Titanic to keep a lookout for their signal rockets.

Carpathia arrived at the distress position shortly after 4:00 a.m., about an hour and a half after Titanic sank, and five hours before any other ship. Cottam recalled seeing floating wood and debris at the scene, but no bodies. For the next four and a half hours, the ship took on the 705 survivors from Titanic's 20 lifeboats before setting course for New York.

=== Aftermath and inquiries ===
In 1913, Rostron wrote that about 4:30 p.m. Monday 15 April, Carpathia responded to a request for information by RMS Olympic by sending "bare facts" and names of survivors, as well as official messages to the Cunard company, which took until 1:00 a.m. when Carpathia was out of range. He went on, "It was most difficult to get the names even, and the continuous strain at the instrument, the conditions under which the operator was working, and the constant interruptions made it anything but a simple matter."

On Tuesday evening, Harold Bride, Titanic's surviving wireless operator, was asked relieve and assist Cottam, in spite of serious foot injuries he had incurred in the disaster. By then, Cottam had not slept from the morning of 14 April and once fell asleep at the key. Cottam and Bride worked together, relaying official messages about the disaster and survivors to ships in the area, as well as messages to and from relatives of Titanic passengers. On Rostron's order, they ignored inquiries from journalists. Afterward, both Cottam and Bride stated that the volume of official and passenger messages was so great that they would not have had time to respond to media requests anyway.

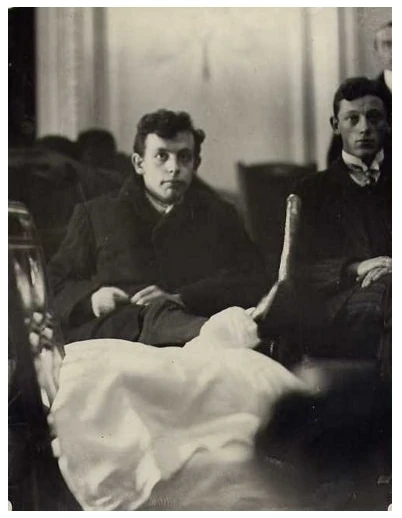
Cottam (right) with surviving Titanic wireless operator Harold Bride at the U.S. Titanic inquiry at the Waldorf Astoria Hotel in New York City

Immediately upon Carpathia's arrival in New York, Cottam told the Senate inquiry, he received his employer's permission to meet with The New York Times, which bought his story for $750. The story, "Titanic's "C.Q.D." Caught by a Lucky Fluke", was published the next day.

In April and May 1912, first in New York and then in Washington, D.C., Cottam was called on to testify on multiple occasions before the U.S. Senate inquiry into the disaster. Upon returning to England, he testified on 12 May 1912 before the British Wreck Commissioner's inquiry in London.

Questions to Cottam at the inquiries sought to establish the disaster's timeline of events and standard wireless procedures, as well as wireless operators' obligations in emergency situations. Questioners also cited conflicting news reports and miscommunications from the various ships in the vicinity of the disaster and in communication with Carpathia. They asked numerous questions regarding whether Cottam had communicated with journalists or received instructions from the Marconi Company or one of the shipping lines not to share information he had been instructed to send. Cottam testified that, although he was an employee of the Marconi Company, aboard ship, the captain's orders superseded those of the company.

The Senate inquiry found Cottam did not show "proper vigilance" in handling official information during Carpathia's return to New York, citing a telegram from J. Bruce Ismay, chairman of the White Star Line, to Philip Franklin, who was in charge of the White Star Line's New York office. According to the inquiry's report, although Carpathia's purser gave the message to Cottam the morning of 15 April, it was not sent until the morning of 17 April, via Halifax, despite specific instructions from Rostron via the purser to send the message as early as possible. The report suggested that a previous incident of a different wireless operator using disaster information to their own advantage, together with Cottam's motivation to sell his story to reporters, "subjects the participants to criticism, and the practice should be prohibited." This line of reasoning, among others, came under criticism from other members of the investigating committee, who threatened to quit over Senator William Alden Smith's handling of the investigation. During the course of the investigation, it was revealed that the message had been transmitted with the first bundle of messages sent when Carpathia regained contact with shore.

The British Wreck Commissioner's inquiry report made no remark about Cottam, beyond noting that Carpathia received and responded to Titanic's distress call.

== Recognition and legacy ==
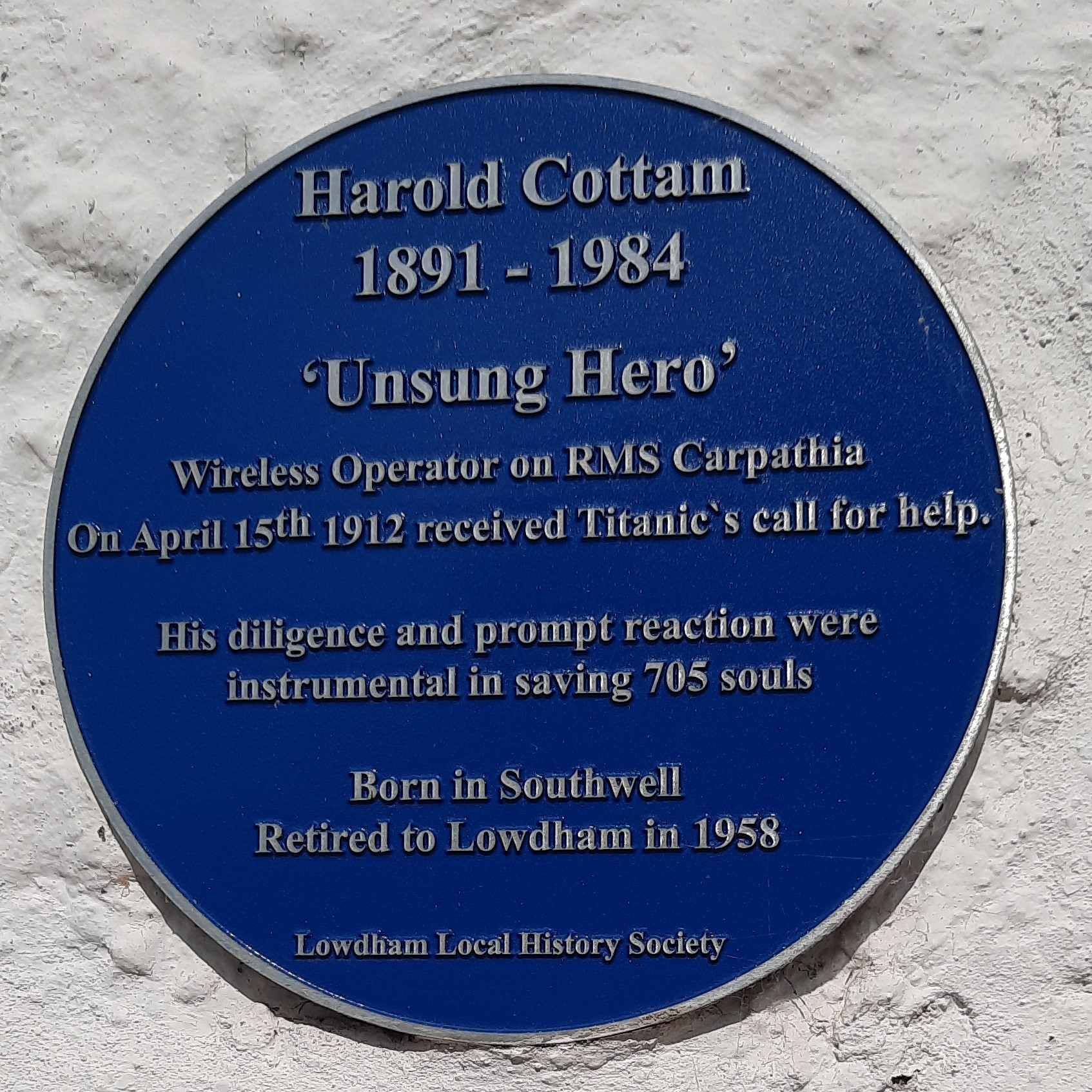
Plaque commemorating Cottam on The Old Ship Inn where he lived later in life

The fact that Cottam had received Titanic's distress signals by chance, while SS Californian, which was much closer, missed them entirely, because its wireless operator Cyril Evans was asleep, added to the evidence for consistent safety measures regarding wireless and led to the Radio Act of 1912, requiring all ships to man wireless distress frequencies around the clock.

Cottam, along with the rest of the crew of Carpathia, received a medal by the Titanic Survivors Committee. Crew members were awarded bronze medals, officers silver, and Captain Rostron a silver cup and a gold medal, presented by Margaret 'Molly' Brown.

Cottam was modest about his role in the disaster and, outside a few interviews, rarely spoke of it to friends and family, preferring privacy.

Cottam's crucial role in the disaster was honored in 2013 with a blue plaque on the wall of The Old Ship Inn in Lowdham, Nottinghamshire, where he lived after retiring. The plaque reads:

Harold Cottam
1891–1984

'Unsung Hero'
Wireless Operator on RMS Carpathia
On April 15, 1912 received Titanic's call for help.

His diligence and prompt reaction were
instrumental in saving 705 souls

Born in Southwell
Retired to Lowdham in 1958

Lowdham Local History Society

=== Portrayals ===
Cottam has been portrayed several times in Titanic media. In A Night to Remember, he was played by Alec McCowen. In 1979, he was portrayed by Christopher Strauli in S. O. S. Titanic.

- Alec McCowen (1958) A Night to Remember
- Christopher Strauli (1979) S.O.S. Titanic (TV Film)
- Ian Davidson (2025) Titanic Sinks Tonight (TV series)

== Later life ==
Cottam continued to work as a shipboard wireless operator on various ships until 1922, when he married Elsie Jean Shepperson and took a job as a sales representative of the Minimax fire extinguisher company.

Cottam and his wife had four children: William, Jean, Sybil and Angus. Angus died in the late 1960s.

Cottam retired and, in 1958, moved to Lowdham, Nottinghamshire, where he died in 1984. His remains were cremated at Wilford Hill Crematorium in Nottingham, and his ashes were scattered in the garden of rest.
