= Minnetonka (disambiguation) =

Minnetonka is a suburban city in Hennepin County, Minnesota, United States.

Minnetonka may also refer to:

- Minnetonka Cave, a limestone cave in Idaho, United States
- Minnetonka High School, a high school in Minnetonka, Minnesota, United States
- Minnetonka, Winnipeg, a neighbourhood of Winnipeg, Manitoba, Canada
- Lake Minnetonka, an inland lake west-southwest of Minneapolis, Minnesota, United States
- USS Minnetonka, ships of the U.S. Navy
- SS Minnetonka, ships of the Atlantic Transport Line

== See also ==
- Minnetonka Beach, Minnesota, a city in Hennepin County, Minnesota, United States
