= Maritime call sign =

Call signs assigned as unique identifiers to ships, planes, and boats

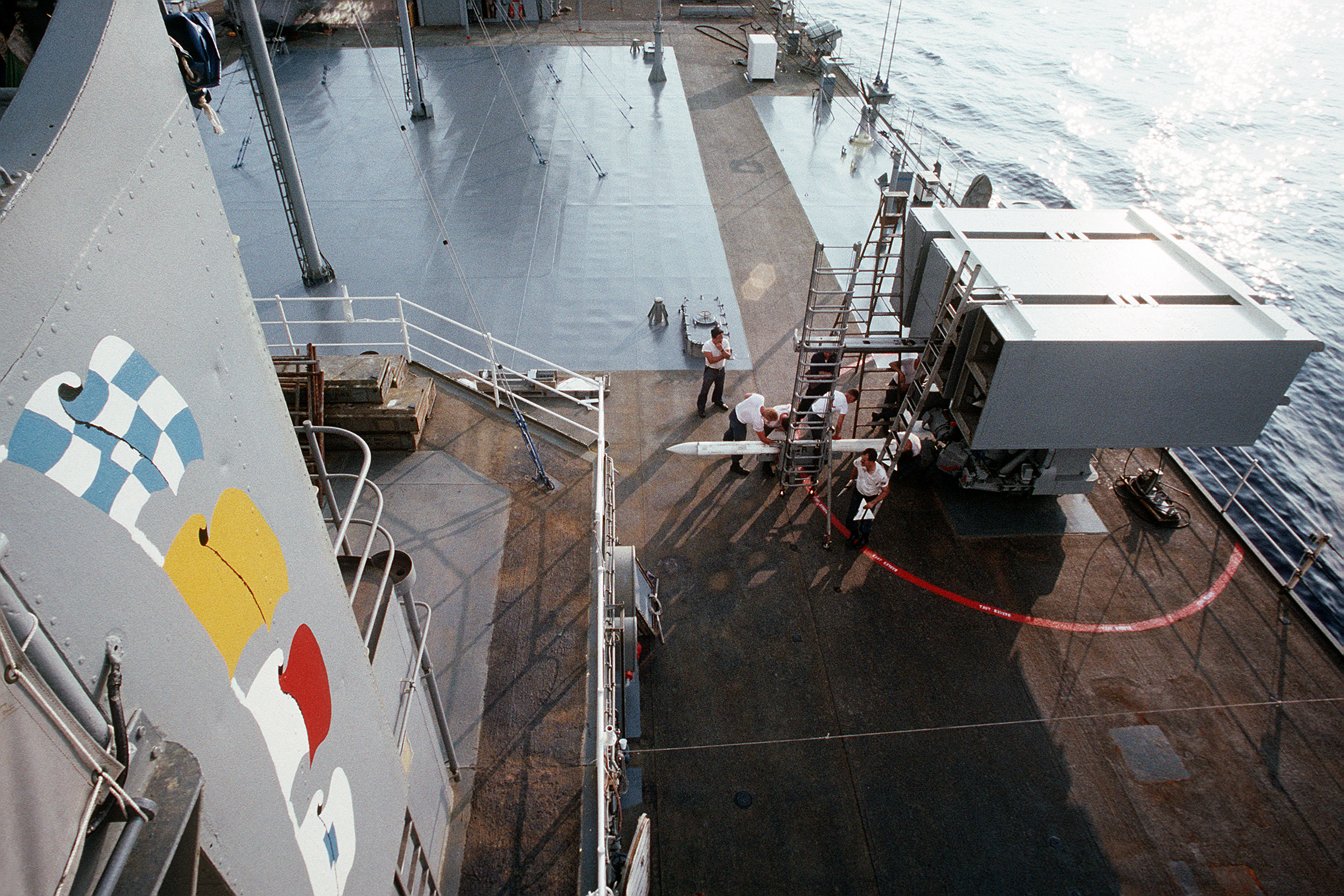
USS Blue Ridge's callsign, "NQHS", is painted on her superstructure

Maritime call signs are call signs assigned as unique identifiers to ships and boats. All radio transmissions must be individually identified by the call sign. Merchant and naval vessels are assigned call signs by their national licensing authorities.

== History ==
One of the earliest applications of radiotelegraph operation, long predating broadcast radio, were marine radio stations installed aboard ships at sea. In the absence of international standards, early transmitters constructed after Guglielmo Marconi's first transatlantic message in 1901 were issued arbitrary two-letter calls by radio companies, alone or later preceded by a one-letter company identifier. These mimicked an earlier railroad telegraph convention where short, two-letter identifiers served as Morse code abbreviations to denote the various individual stations on the line (for instance, AX could represent Halifax). "N" and two letters would identify U.S. Navy; "M" and two letters would be a Marconi station.

On April 14, 1912, the RMS Titanic station MGY, busily delivering telegram traffic from ship's passengers to the coastal station at Cape Race, Newfoundland (call sign MCE), would receive warnings of ice fields from Marconi stations aboard the SS Mesaba (call sign MMV) and the SS Californian (call sign MWL). Its distress call CQD CQD CQD CQD CQD CQD DE MGY MGY MGY MGY MGY MGY POSITION 41.44 N 50.24 W would be answered by a station aboard the RMS Carpathia (call sign MPA). Later that same year, an international conference standardised radio call signs so that the first two letters would uniquely identify a transmitter's country of origin.

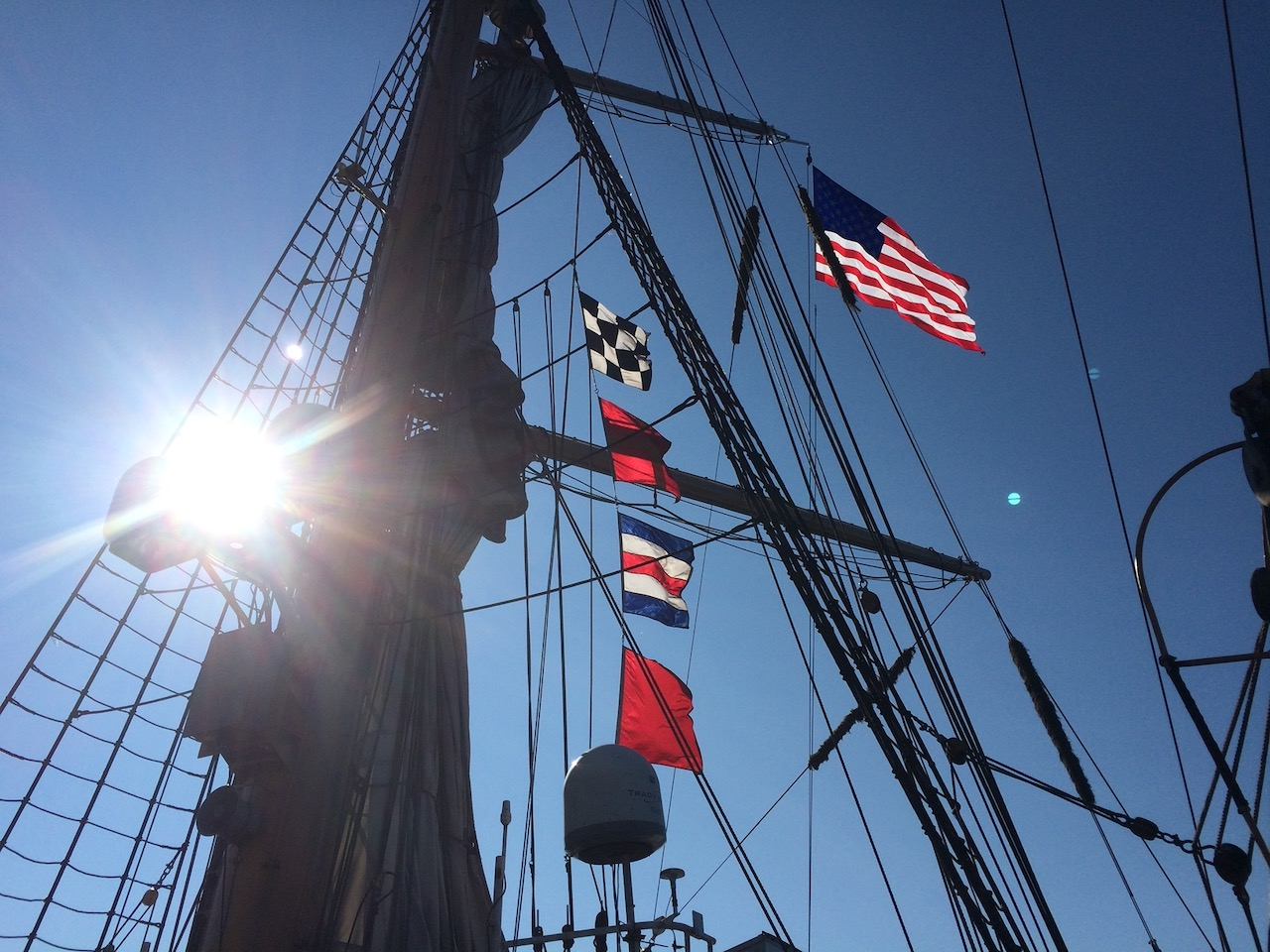
USCGC Eagle displays her call sign, "NRCB", using signal flags.

Merchant and naval vessels are assigned call signs by their national licensing authorities. In the case of states such as Liberia or Panama, which are flags of convenience for ship registration, call signs for larger vessels consist of the national prefix plus three letters (for example, 3LXY, and sometimes followed by a number, i.e. 3LXY2). United States merchant vessels are given call signs beginning with the letters "W" or "K" while U.S. naval ships are assigned call signs beginning with "N". Originally, both ships and broadcast stations were given call signs in this series consisting of three or four letters, but as demand for both marine radio and broadcast call signs grew, gradually American-flagged vessels were given longer call signs with mixed letters and numbers. U.S. Navy and Coast Guard vessels typically fly their call sign using maritime signal flags from their inboard port signal halyard when entering or leaving port.

As broadcast stations became commonplace in the 1920s, some original three- and four-letter call signs were reassigned as the corresponding ships were removed from U.S. registry. The WSB call sign had been held by two ships (the SS Francis H. Leggett, shipwrecked off Oregon's coast on September 18, 1914, and later the Firwood, a ship destroyed by fire near Peru on December 18, 1919) before being assigned to The Atlanta Journal for use by its Atlanta, Georgia, broadcast radio station in 1922. Similarly, WEZU, the international radio call sign of the ship SS Lash Atlantico, was assigned in 1997 to a broadcast station. Additional call signs would be reassigned to coastal stations or moved from marine radio to terrestrial broadcast radio when ships were sold for registration to foreign nations, as the new owners would obtain new, local call signs for any existing shipboard radio stations.

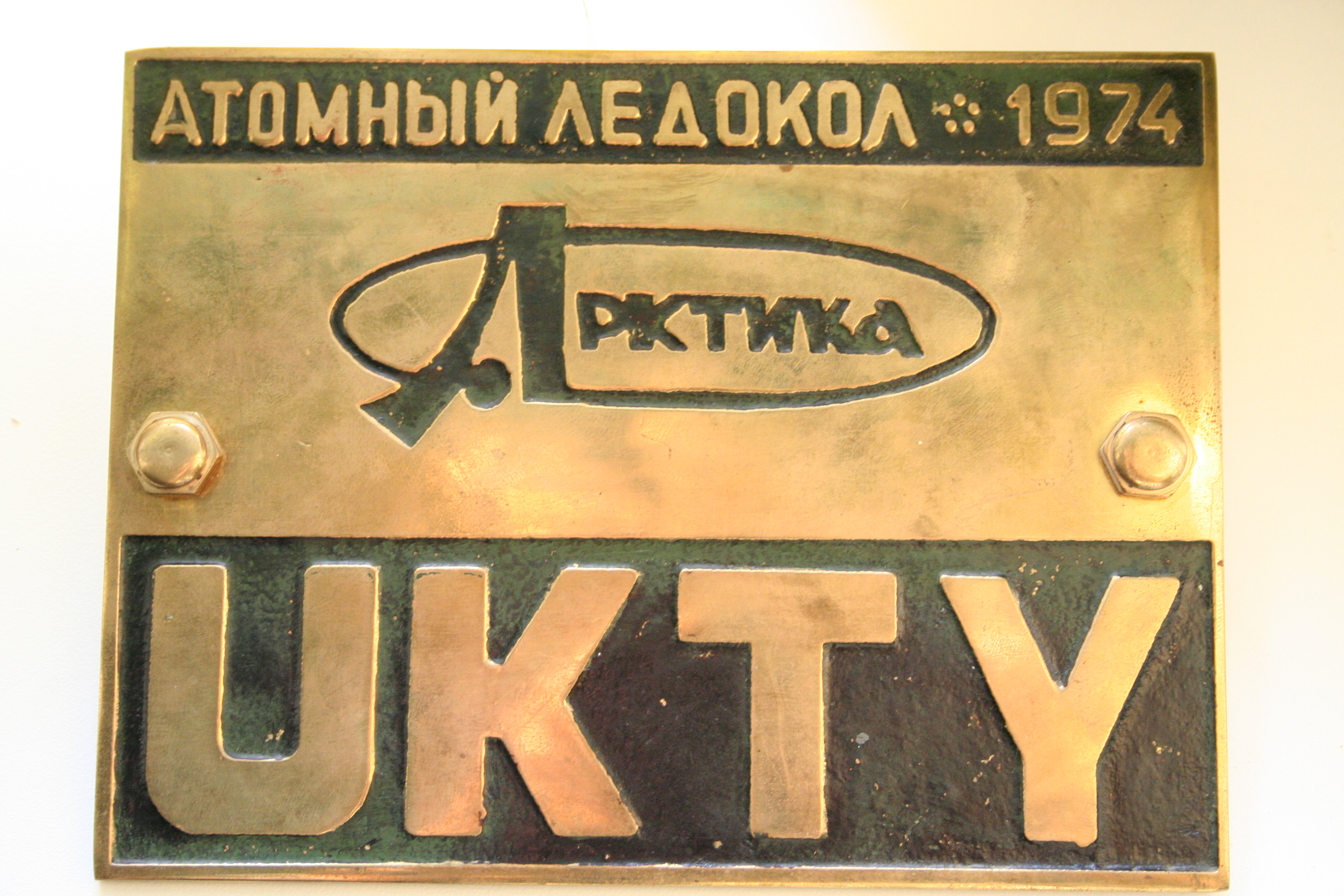
Soviet nuclear Icebreaker Arktika with call sign UKTY

In the U.S., leisure craft with VHF radios may not be assigned call signs, in which case the name of the vessel is used instead. Ships in the U.S. wishing to have a radio licence anyway are under FCC Radio Service Code SA: "Ship Recreational or Voluntarily Equipped". Those calls follow the land mobile format of the initial letter K or W followed by 1 or 2 letters followed by 3 or 4 numbers (such as KX0983 or WXX0029).

U.S. Coast Guard small boats have a number that is shown on both bows (i.e. port and starboard) in which the first two digits indicate the nominal length of the boat in feet. For example, Coast Guard 47021 refers to the 21st in the series of 47-foot motor lifeboats. The call sign might also be abbreviated to the final two or three numbers during operations, for example: Coast Guard zero two one.

== See also ==
- Maritime Mobile Service Identity
- Pan-pan
- Marconi International Marine Communication Company, the first maritime communications company
