= Radio operator =

Person responsible for the operations of a radio system

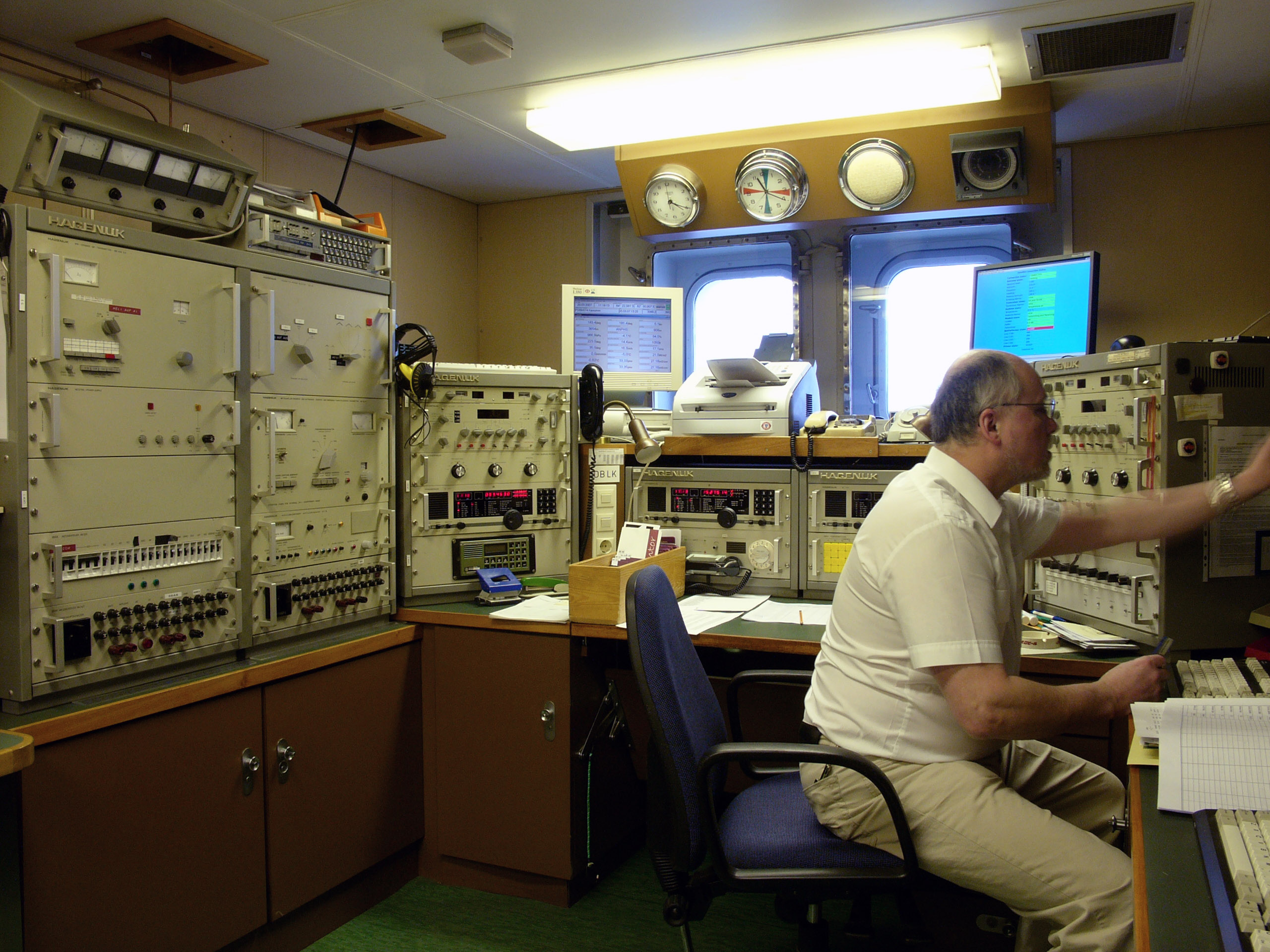
A radio operator aboard the RV Polarstern.

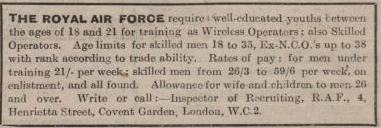
An RAF advertisement recruiting "Wireless Operators", from the 21 December 1923 edition of The Radio Times

A wireless operator transposes a plain language message into perforated morse tape, while another threads the tape into a high-speed transmitter

A radio operator (formerly known as wireless operator in British and Commonwealth English), also referred to as radio officer, is a person who is responsible for the operation of a ship radio station and the technicalities aboard.

The profession of radio operator has become largely obsolete with the automation of radio-based tasks in recent decades. Nevertheless, radio operators are still employed in maritime and aviation fields. In most cases radio transmission is now only one of several tasks of a radio operator.

The role of 'Wireless Operator' aboard aircraft during WWII was often abbreviated to 'WOp' or 'WOP' in official documents or obituaries.

== History ==
Radio operators were indispensable at sea in the early days of wireless telegraphy, and many young men were called to sea as professional radio operators who were always accorded high-paying officer status at sea. Subsequent to the Titanic disaster and the Radio Act of 1912, the International Safety of Life at Sea (SOLAS) conventions established the 500kHz maritime distress frequency monitoring and mandated that all passenger-carrying ships carry licensed radio telegraph operators.

On board ships, radio operators were nicknamed "Sparks," in reference to the spark-gap transmitter which were installed in the early years of wireless at sea; the nickname stuck around long after the spark gap transmitters became obsolete.

== Notable radio operators ==
- Harold Bride, assistant radio operator of RMS Titanic
- Harold Cottam, radio operator of RMS Carpathia during the sinking of RMS Titanic
- Jack Binns, last radio operator of RMS Republic
- Jack Phillips, chief radio operator of Titanic
- Cyril Evans, radio operator of SS Californian during the sinking of Titanic
- Robert Leith, last chief radio operator of RMS Lusitania
- Graynella Packer, one of the first female radio operators aboard a ship.

== See also ==
- Wireless telegraphy
- Telegraphist
- Marconi International Marine Communication Company, one of the first wireless communication companies in history
