= USS Minnetonka =

USS Minnetonka is the name of the following ships of the U.S. Navy:

- USS Minnetonka (1867), a Java-class frigate
- USS Minnetonka (1869), a Casco-class monitor

== See also ==
- Minnetonka (disambiguation)
- SS Minnetonka
