= SS Californian =

Cargo ship that missed the Titanic's distress signals

Coordinates: 35°32′30″N 22°06′06″E

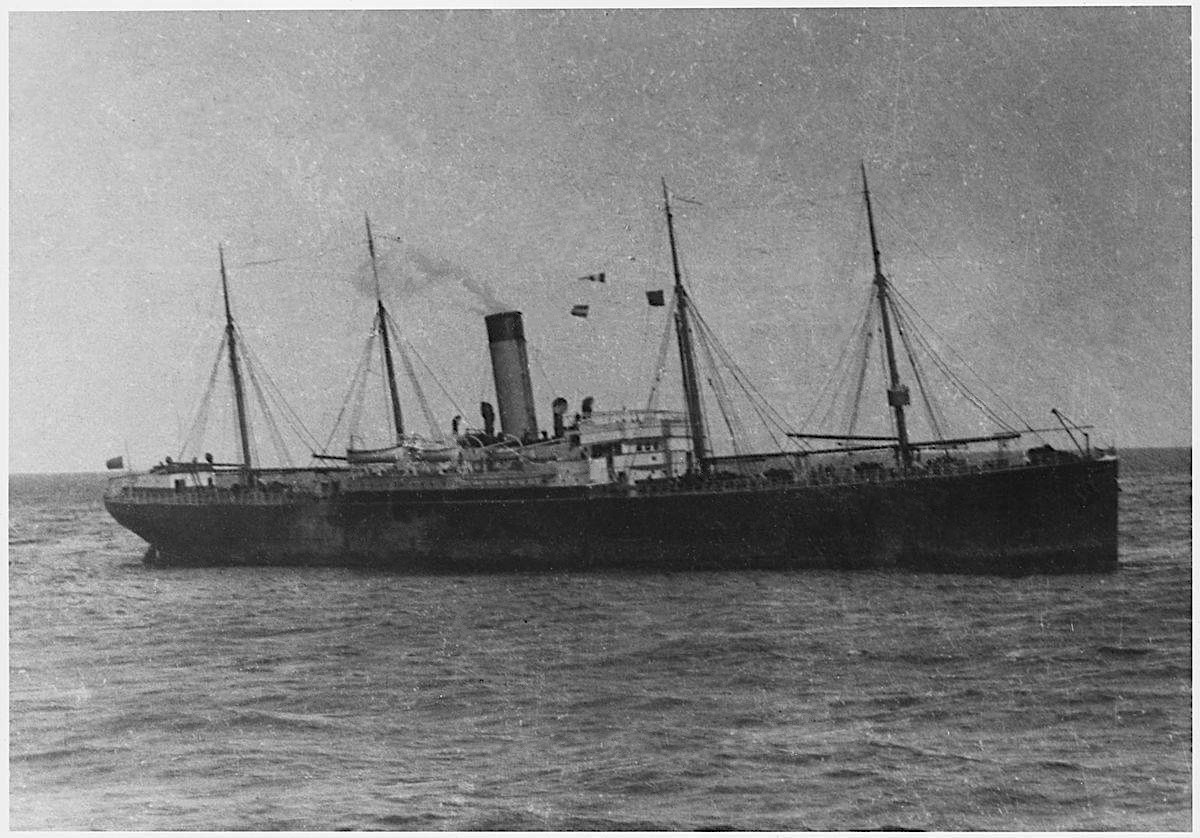
- Californian on the morning after Titanic sank; photo taken from RMS Carpathia by Louis Ogden

History

United Kingdom
- Name: Californian
- Namesake: State of California
- Owner: Leyland Line
- Port of registry: Liverpool
- Route: North Atlantic crossing
- Builder: Caledon Shipbuilding & Engineering, Dundee
- Cost: £105,000 (equivalent to about £11,200,000 in 2025)
- Yard number: 159
- Launched: 26 November 1901
- Completed: 30 January 1902
- Maiden voyage: 31 January 1902
- Identification: UK official number 115243; code letters TFLN; by 1913: wireless call sign MWL
- Fate: Scuttled after damage by U-boat torpedoing, 9 November 1915

General characteristics
- Type: Cargo liner
- Tonnage: 6,223 GRT, 4,038 NRT
- Length: 447.6 ft (136.4 m) registered
- Beam: 53.8 ft (16.4 m)
- Depth: 30.5 ft (9.3 m)
- Decks: 3
- Installed power: 1 × triple-expansion engine; 518 NHP
- Propulsion: 1 × screw propeller
- Speed: 13 knots (service speed)
- Boats & landing craft carried: 6 (4 lifeboats, 1 gig and 1 pinnace) with total capacity for 218 people.
- Capacity: 35 1st class passengers
- Crew: 55 officers and crew

SS Californian was a British passenger-cargo steamship of the Leyland Line. She is thought to have been the only ship within sight of RMS Titanic, or at least her rockets, during that ship's sinking on 15 April 1912. The crew took no action to assist.

The United States Senate inquiry and British Wreck Commissioner's inquiry into the sinking both concluded that many or all of the lives lost could have been saved, had Californian responded promptly to Titanic's distress rockets. The U.S. Senate inquiry was particularly critical of the vessel's captain, Stanley Lord, calling his inaction during the disaster "reprehensible".

Despite this criticism, no formal charges were ever brought against Lord or his crew. Towards the end of his life, Lord sought to clear his name with the help of Leslie Harrison, a union attorney, and his son Stanley Tutton Lord. In 1992, the UK Government's Marine Accident Investigation Branch re-examined the case; they condemned Lord's inaction in responding to the distress signals but held that, due to the limited time available, "the effect of Californian taking proper action would have been no more than to place on her the task actually carried out by RMS Carpathia, that is the rescue of those who escaped... [no] reasonably probable action by Captain Lord could have led to a different outcome of the tragedy".

Californian was scuttled in the Eastern Mediterranean during World War I on 9 November 1915 after being critically damaged by the German submarines SM U-34 and U-35, while serving as a transport ship.

== Building and early career ==
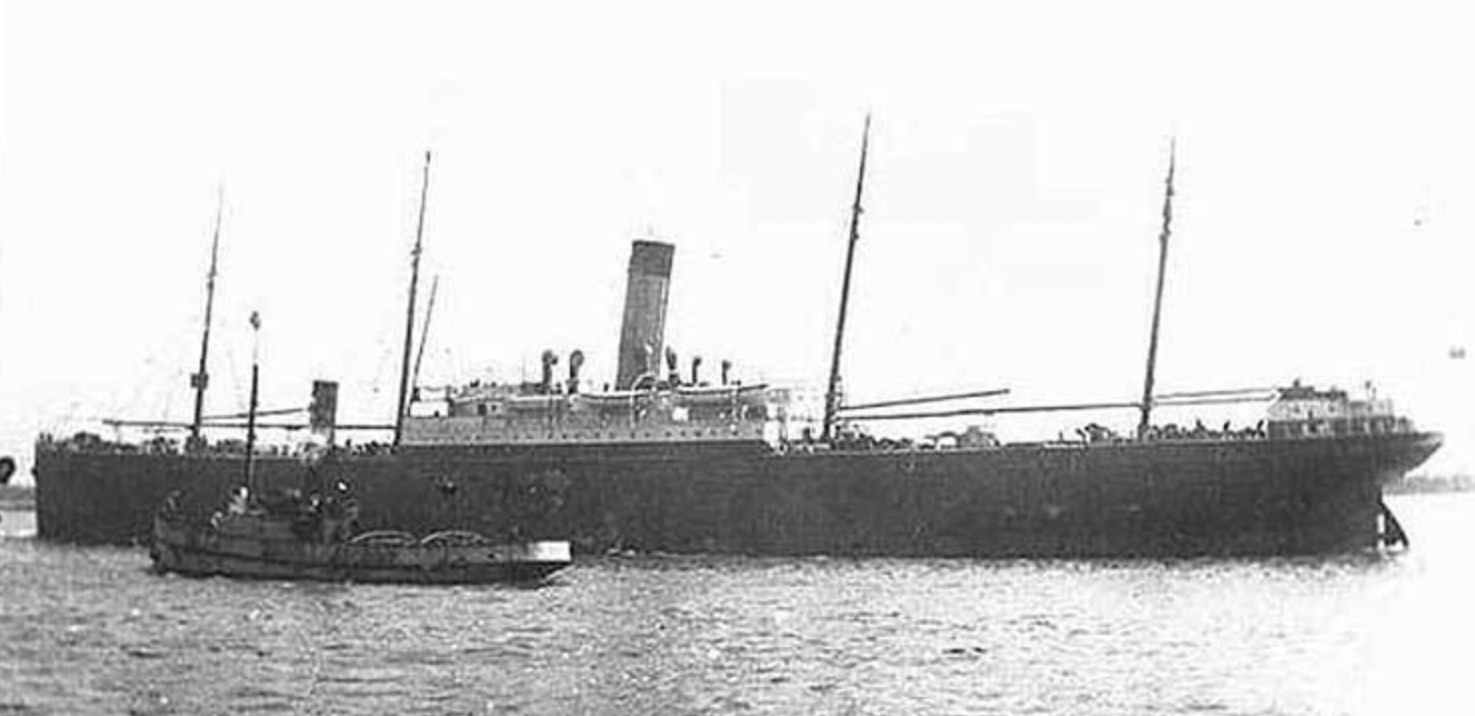
Californian arriving in port

Californian was a steamship owned by the Leyland Line, part of J.P. Morgan's International Mercantile Marine Co. She was constructed by the Caledon Shipbuilding & Engineering Company in Dundee, Scotland, and was the largest ship built in Dundee up to that time. The ship was built to the maximum dimensions that were allowed to moor and outfit her in the Dundee Docks. The ship's size and importance to the local shipbuilding industry meant that there was a lot of local interest in her construction as it progressed. There were also some problems – when both of the ship's boilers were being transported through the streets from a foundry to the shipyard the weight of them (carried on a wheeled bogie) caused considerable damage to the city's roads, as well as breaking a number of underground water pipes. Later when a crane was being used to rig a spar on one of Californian's four masts, the spar became tangled in nearby telephone wires and severed them.

She was designed primarily to transport cotton, but also had first class berths for 35 passengers. By offering comfortable cabins at affordable fares; £10 per crossing in the direction Liverpool — Boston, £50 in the opposite direction; Leyland Line secured an additional income. Nonetheless, she was still primarily a cargo ship. She was named Californian according to a tradition specific to the company which gave its ships the name of one of the 46 states of the United States at the time. She measured 6,223 tons, was 447 feet (136 m) long, 53 feet (16 m) at her beam, and had a three-cylinder triple-expansion engine powered by two double-ended boilers. Her average full speed was 12 knots (22 km/h). The accommodation of most of the fifty or so crew members was below the foredeck. They slept in cabins designed for four to eight people that were quite uncomfortable, poorly ventilated and lit. In all, the crew included the captain, four officers, a radio operator, and 49 crew members (able seamen, stokers, trimmers, etc.). The cabins were located in the superstructure. The officers of the crew resided on the starboard side, and the passengers on the port side. Passenger facilities corresponded to the second class of most ships of the time. Although the cabins were not of high quality, they were comfortable, and had electric lighting, which was not the case on all contemporary ships. Californian's passengers also had use of a smoking room on the upper starboard deck, decorated with oak panels and linoleum, a novelty at the turn of the century. The dining room was also decorated and comfortable.

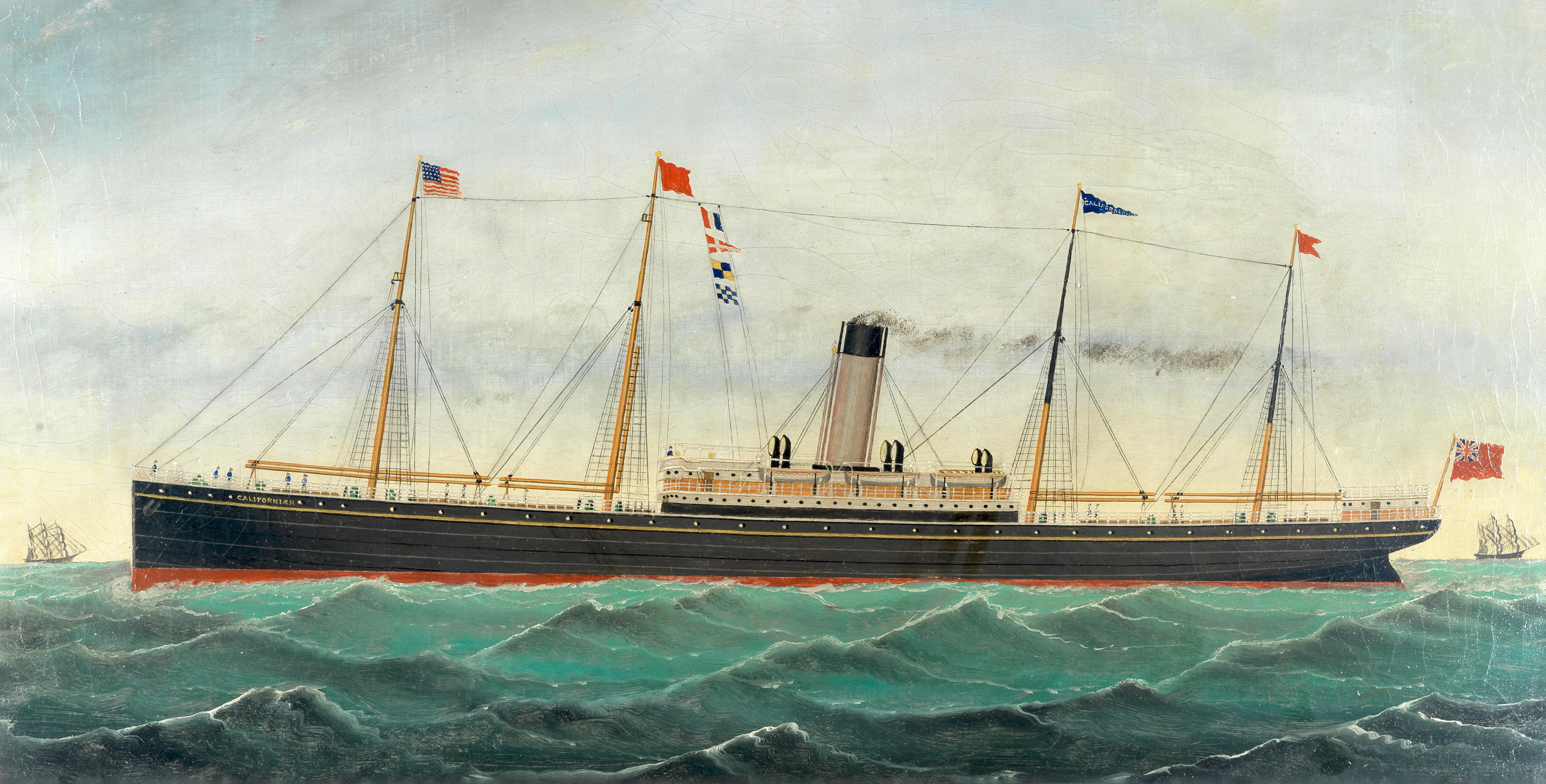
An artist's depiction of Californian under way.

Californian was launched on 26 November 1901 and completed her sea trials on 23 January 1902. From 31 January 1902 to 3 March 1902, she made her maiden voyage from Dundee to New Orleans, Louisiana, United States. Subsequently, she made transatlantic crossings, generally carrying around thirty passengers in addition to her cargo. In 1902, she was chartered by the Dominion Line for five crossings to Portland, Maine. She then returned to the Leyland Line service to serve the southern United States. From 1901 to 1911, she was commanded successively by four captains before being finally put under the command of Stanley Lord.

Between late 1911 and early 1912, Californian had a Marconi wireless apparatus installed in a refitted cabin. Her first radio operator was Cyril Furmstone Evans.

== Sinking of Titanic ==
On 30 March 1912, Californian made a stopover in London on a trip to New Orleans during which she had to face a storm which damaged part of her cotton cargo. Stanley Lord, who had commanded Californian since 27 March 1911, was her captain when she left the Royal Albert Dock, Liverpool, England on 5 April 1912 on her way to Boston, Massachusetts. She was not carrying any passengers on this voyage. On the navigation bridge, Lord was accompanied by three officers and an apprentice: George Stewart (second in command or chief officer), Herbert Stone (second officer), Charles Groves (third officer) and apprentice James Gibson.

The first week of the crossing was uneventful. On Sunday 14 April at 18:30 ship's time, Californian's only Wireless operator, Cyril Furmstone Evans, signalled to the Antillian that three large icebergs were five miles to the south. Titanic's wireless operator Harold Bride also received the warning and delivered it to the ship's bridge a few minutes later.

Californian encountered a large ice field at 22:20 ship's time, and Captain Lord decided to stop the ship and wait until morning before proceeding further. Before leaving the bridge, he thought he saw a ship's light away to the eastward but could not be sure it was not just a rising star. Lord continued to the engineers' cabins and met with the chief, whom he told about his plans for stopping. As they were talking, they saw a ship's lights approaching. Lord asked Evans if he knew of any ships in the area, and Evans responded: "only the Titanic." Lord asked Evans to inform her that Californian was stopped and surrounded by ice. Lord ordered Evans to warn all other ships in the area, which he did.

At the time Titanic's on-duty wireless operator, Jack Phillips, was busy clearing a backlog of passengers' messages with the wireless station at Cape Race, Newfoundland, 800 miles (1,300 km) away. Evans's message that Californian was stopped and surrounded by ice was heard very strongly on Titanic due to the relative proximity of the two ships and drowned out a separate message Phillips had been in the process of receiving from Cape Race, prompting Phillips to tell Evans to stop transmitting in the straight diction of wireless operators: "Keep out; I am working Cape Race." (or, in morse code, "DDD"). Contrary to common belief, Evans was not offended nor did he take the common code for "stop transmitting" to be an insult. Instead, he listened in for a while before he switched off his wireless equipment and went to bed. A few minutes later, at 23:40, Titanic hit an iceberg. Shortly after midnight, she transmitted her first distress call.

Third Officer Charles Groves of Californian testified to the British inquiry that at 23:10 ship's time, he had seen the lights of another ship come into view 10 or 12 miles away, 3.5 points above Californian's starboard beam. At about 23:30, Groves went below to inform Lord. The latter suggested that the ship be contacted by Morse lamp, which was tried, but no reply was seen. To Groves, she was clearly a large liner, as she had multiple decks brightly lit. The ship finally seemed to stop and extinguish her deck lights at 23:40, the same time Titanic stopped her engines. At the British inquiry, Groves agreed that if the ship he saw had turned two points to port, it would have concealed her deck lights.

Slightly after midnight, Second Officer Herbert Stone took watch from Groves. He testified that he, too, observed the ship, judging it to be about five miles away. He tried signalling her with the Morse lamp, also without success. Apprentice officer James Gibson, who had been doing the Morse signalling, testified that at 00:55, Stone told him he had observed five rockets in the sky above the nearby ship. Stone testified that he had informed Captain Lord, although the British inquiry did not ask whether or not he communicated the number. Lord asked if the rockets had been a company signal, but Stone did not know. Lord and Stone both testified that Stone reported they were not distress signals. Lord ordered Stone to tell him if anything about the ship changed, to keep signalling it with the Morse lamp, but did not order that it be contacted by wireless.

Gibson testified that Stone had expressed unease to him about the situation: "A ship is not going to fire rockets at sea for nothing", Stone said. "She looks very queer out of the water—her lights look queer." Gibson observed, "She looks rather to have a big side out of the water", and he agreed that "everything was not all right with her"; that it was "a case of some kind of distress". Stone, however, under increasingly incredulous questioning by the British inquiry, testified repeatedly that he did not think at the time that the rockets could have been distress signals, and that the possibility did not occur to him until he learned the Titanic had sunk.

Map of the location of the catastrophe and other ships in the vicinity, early morning of 15 April 1912

By 02:00, the ship appeared to be leaving the area. A few minutes later, Gibson informed Captain Lord as such and that eight white rockets had been seen. Lord asked whether he was sure of the colour. Gibson said yes and left.

At 02:20, Titanic sank. At 03:40, Stone and Gibson, still sharing the middle watch, spotted rockets to the south. They did not see the ship that was firing them, but at about this same time RMS Carpathia was coming quickly from the southeast, firing rockets to let Titanic know that help was on the way. At 04:16, Chief Officer George F. Stewart relieved Stone, and almost immediately noticed, coming into view from the south, a brilliantly lit, four-masted steamship with one funnel; Carpathia arrived on the scene shortly after 04:00.

Captain Lord woke up at 04:30 and went out on deck to decide how to proceed past the ice to the west. He sent Stewart to wake Evans and find out what happened to the ship they had seen to the south. They subsequently learned from the Frankfurt that the Titanic had sunk overnight. Lord ordered the ship underway. Californian's course took her west, slowly passing through the ice field, after which she turned south. Californian was sighted at 06:00 by SS Mount Temple steaming from the north. Californian actually passed the Carpathia to the west, then turned, and headed northeast back towards the rescue ship, arriving at 08:30.

Carpathia was just finishing picking up the last of Titanic's survivors. After communicating with Californian, Carpathia left the area, leaving Californian to search for any other survivors. Californian however, only found scattered wreckage, empty lifeboats, and corpses, and continued on its route to Boston.

=== Aftermath ===
Upon arrival in Boston, several key crew members, including Lord and Evans, were summoned to give evidence at the American Senate inquiry into the sinking of Titanic, which began started on 19 April 1912, the day Californian arrived unnoticed. Initially, the world was unaware of her proximity to the disaster. On 22 April, the inquiry discovered that a ship near Titanic, whose identity then was unknown, had failed to respond to the distress signals.

The next day, a small newspaper in New England, The Clinton Daily Item, printed a story claiming that Californian had refused aid to Titanic. The source for the story was Californian's carpenter, James McGregor, who stated that he had seen Titanic's lights and distress rockets. On the same day, the Boston American printed a story sourced by Californian's assistant engineer, Ernest Gill, with essentially the same account.

Captain Lord also spoke with several Boston area newspapers but gave conflicting accounts. In a Boston Traveller article dated 19 April, Lord claimed that his ship was 30 miles from Titanic, but in a Boston Post article dated 24 April, he claimed 20 miles. Lord told the Boston Globe that his ship had spent three hours steaming around the wreck site trying to render assistance, but Third Officer Grove later stated that the search ended after two hours, at 10:40. When reporters asked Lord about his exact position the night of the disaster, he refused to respond, calling such information "state secrets".

After the newspaper revelations on 23 April, the U.S. Senate inquiry issued subpoenas for multiple members of the crew, including Gill and Lord. During his testimony, Gill repeated his claims. Lord's testimony was conflicting and changing. He detailed three different ice conditions; he admitted knowing about the rockets, despite having told Boston newspapers that his ship had not seen any rockets, but insisted that they were not distress rockets. He also asserted they were fired not from Titanic but a small steamship, the so-called "third ship" of the night. Yet the testimony of Captain J. Knapp, U.S. Navy, and a part of the Navy Hydrographer's Office, made clear that Titanic and Californian were in sight of each other, and no third vessel had been in the area.

The issue of Californian's so-called "scrap log" was also scrutinized; the unofficial log from which the information in the official log is drawn, having been approved by the captain. Company policy of International Mercantile Marine Co., the parent of both Leyland Line and the White Star Line, required scrap logs to be destroyed daily. The official log mentioned neither a nearby ship nor rockets. At the British inquiry, Stone was not asked to recall the notations he had actually written in the scrap log, during his bridge-watch between midnight and 4:00 on 15 April.

On 2 May, the British Wreck Commissioner's inquiry into the sinking began. Again, Lord gave conflicting, inconsistent, and evasive testimony. The crew of Californian also gave conflicting testimonies. Most notably, Lord said he was not told that the nearby ship had disappeared, contradicting James Gibson, who testified he had reported it to Lord, who had acknowledged him.

Also during the inquiries, Titanic survivors recalled seeing the lights of another ship after Titanic had hit the iceberg. To Titanic's Fourth Officer Boxhall, the other ship appeared to be off Titanic's bow, five miles (8 km) away and heading in her direction. Just like Californian's officers, Boxhall attempted signaling the ship with a Morse lamp, but received no response. The same lights were noted by Fifth Officer Harold Lowe who spotted the lights himself while helping load and lower Boat no. 1, noting that he thought the ship was five miles north of them, off the port bow. However, Titanic lookout Frederick Fleet, who was in the crow's nest when the iceberg was sighted and remained there for another forty minutes, testified at the US inquiry that he did not see the lights of another ship while in the crow's nest. He only saw a light later after leaving the ship on a lifeboat.

Titanic's Captain Edward Smith had felt the ship was close enough that he ordered the first lifeboats launched on the port side to row over to the ship, drop off the passengers, and come back to Titanic for more. Moreover, lifeboat occupants reported the other ship's lights were seen from the lifeboats throughout the night; one lifeboat rowed towards them but never seemed to get any closer.

Both the American and British inquires found that Californian must have been closer than the 19.5 miles (31.4 km) claimed by Captain Lord, and that each ship was visible from the other. Indeed, when Carpathia arrived at the wreck site, a vessel was clearly seen to the north; this was later identified as Californian. Both inquiries concluded that Captain Lord had failed to provide proper assistance to Titanic.

Although Lord had stopped his ship upon encountering ice, the British inquiry concluded that if Californian had acted upon the rockets and pushed through the ice, Californian "might have saved many, if not all, of the lives that were lost". The U.S. Senate inquiry was also critical of Lord's inaction, the final report stating that "such conduct, whether arising from indifference or gross carelessness, is most reprehensible, and places upon the commander the Californian a grave responsibility".

Senator William Alden Smith, in a speech to the U.S. Senate inquiry, said: "the failure of Capt. Lord to arouse the wireless operator on his ship, who could have easily ascertained the name of the vessel in distress and reached her in time to avert loss of life, places a tremendous responsibility upon this officer from which it will be very difficult for him to escape".

Despite the criticisms of Lord's conduct, no formal charges were ever brought against him. As a result, he had no right of appeal against the inquiry's findings. The issue was not considered again until the publication of Walter Lord's (unrelated to Captain Lord) book A Night to Remember in 1955 and the release of the 1958 film of the same name prompted Lord to seek a re-hearing of the inquiry relating to his ship, to counter the allegations made in the book and his portrayal in the film. Petitions presented to the UK Government in 1965 and 1968 by the Mercantile Marine Service Association (MMSA), a union to which Captain Lord belonged, failed to get the matter re-examined. However, when the wreck of the Titanic was discovered by Ballard's expedition in 1985, it was found to be 13 miles from its reported position (the location accepted by both inquiries), so the Board of Trade ordered a re-examination.

The British Government's Marine Accident Investigation Branch (MAIB) concluded its reappraisal of evidence in 1992. The conclusions were those of Deputy Chief Inspector, James de Coverly, stating: "What is significant, however, is that no ship was seen by the Titanic until well after the collision … watch was maintained with officers on the bridge and seamen in the crow's nest, and with their ship in grave danger the lookout for another vessel which could come to their help must have been most anxious and keen. It is in my view inconceivable that Californian or any other ship was within the visible horizon of the Titanic during that period; it equally follows that the Titanic can't have been within the Californian's horizon." The report went on: "More probably, in my view, the ship seen by Californian was another, unidentified, vessel."

The original investigator of the 1992 reappraisal was a Captain Barnett, who unlike de Coverly, concluded "that the Titanic was seen by the Californian and indeed kept under observation from 23:00 or soon after on 14 April until she sank ... [based on] the evidence from Captain Lord and the two watch officers, Mr. Grove and Mr. Stone". It was after Barnett's original report was submitted that Captain de Coverly was given the task of further examination. Both Barnett and de Coverly had concluded that Titanic's rockets had been seen and that Stone and Lord had not responded appropriately to signals of distress.

The 1992 MAIB report concluded that Captain Lord and his crew's actions "fell far short of what was needed," but conceded that absent this, Californian could not have arrived on the scene until "well after the sinking". It also noted that when he did know of Titanic's distress, Lord twice took his ship across an ice field to help search for survivors. Captain Lord's chief defender, union attorney Leslie Harrison, who had led the fight to have the Californian incident re-examined by the British government, called the dual conclusions of the report "an admission of failure to achieve the purpose of the reappraisal".

In the months and years following the disaster, numerous preventive safety measures were enacted. The United States passed the Radio Act of 1912, which required 24-hour radio watch on all ships in case of an emergency. The first International Convention for the Safety of Life at Sea formed a treaty that also required 24-hour radio monitoring and standardized the use of distress rockets.

== Later career and sinking ==
Site of sinking (diamond), off Cape Matapan (red dot)

On 2 July 1913, Californian was docked in Veracruz when a fire erupted in her nos. 3 and 4 holds, sustaining serious damage to herself and her cargo.

Californian continued in normal commercial service until World War I, when the British government took control of her, relinquishing her title of Screw steamer (SS) to Hired Military Transport (HMT). She was responsible for transporting equipment and troops for the Allies during the 1915 Gallipoli campaign.

At 07:45 on 9 November 1915, while en route from Thessaloniki to Marseille at a speed of 12 knots, with a French torpedo boat escort and the French liner Melbourne, a torpedo wake was sighted off of Californian's starboard side. Little could be done to evade, and the torpedo struck amidships. The small convoy had been stalked for some time by the German U-boat SM U-34. Immediately, cargo holds 3 & 4, the boiler room and engine room were flooded. Captain William Masters ordered the lifeboats to be prepared for launch, but believed the ship would not sink; indeed, Californian settled back onto an even keel and remained afloat.

The French torpedo boat attempted to take Californian under tow, but the tow rope broke at 13:20. During a second attempt at 14:15, she was torpedoed again, this time amidships on her port side, by sister SM U-35 (ultimately the most successful U-boat of the entire war). The crew evacuated onto the patrol boat. Still, the ship remained stubbornly afloat, and Captain Masters believed she could be towed to Malta. Upon arrival there, however, it was determined she would be a hazard to navigation, so the French patrol boat was given orders to finish off Californian with gunfire. After two salvos from the patrol boat, and 34 hours after the first torpedo attack, Californian capsized to port and sank bow-first in 10–13,000 feet of water, approximately 60 miles (50 nmi; 100 km) south-southwest of Cape Matapan, Greece. Fireman Richard John Harding was killed during the first torpedo attack, and two other firemen were scalded. To date, Californian's wreck remains undiscovered. Californian sank less than 200 miles (170 nmi; 320 km) from where HMHS Britannic, a sister ship to Titanic, would sink only a little over a year later by striking a mine laid by German SM U-73.

== In popular culture ==
In the 1997 James Cameron film Titanic, there is a deleted scene of the Californian narrative, showing the telegraph operators of each ship and their interaction. Per Cameron, the scene was later cut as to not "distract from the main story". Additionally, an easter egg supposedly confirmed in a later interview with Cameron, can be seen around 2:06:55, just after Molly Brown states "Now there's something you don't see every day". On the left side of the scene, a brief flash of light can be seen just above the lifeboat, thought to represent the Californian's mast headlight seen on the horizon.

The involvement of Californian in the sinking of the Titanic is examined in the 2012 BBC TV drama SOS – The Titanic Inquiry. The drama tells the story of the original British Inquiry into the sinking of Titanic, which decided, using the facts that were available at the time, whether Californian was in near enough proximity to the vessel to rescue some, if not all, of the 1,500 lives lost.

The 2016 novel The Midnight Watch by David Dyer explores the Titanic tragedy from the perspective of the crew of Californian. The narrative centres around a fictional American reporter who tries to uncover what really happened on board Californian that fateful night.

== Bibliography ==
- "Caledon Built – Dundee Ships" (PDF). Friends of Dundee City Archives. Friends of Dundee.
- Butler, Daniel Allen (2009). The Other Side of the Night: The Carpathia, the Californian and the Night the Titanic Was Lost. Casemate Publishers. ISBN 978-1-935149-02-6.
- Chirnside, Mark (2004). The Olympic-class ships: Olympic, Titanic, Britannic. Tempus. ISBN 0-7524-2868-3.
- Codet, François; Mendez, Olivier; Dufief, Alain; Gavard-Perret, Franck (2011). Les Français du Titanic (in French). Rennes: Marine Editions. ISBN 978-2-35743-065-5.
- Haws, Duncan (1979). The Ships of the Cunard, American, Red Star, Inman, Leyland, Dominion, Atlantic Transport and White Star lines. Merchant Fleets in Profile. Vol. 2. Cambridge: Patrick Stephens Ltd. ISBN 0-85059-324-7.
- Lee, Paul (2008). The Titanic and the Indifferent Stranger. Paul Lee. ISBN 978-0-9563015-0-5.
- Lord, Walter (2005) [1955]. A Night to Remember. New York City: St. Martin's Griffin. ISBN 978-0-8050-7764-3.
- MAIB. Titanic: Reappraisal of Evidence (PDF).
- Tennent, AJ (2006). British Merchant Ships Sunk by U-boats in World War One. Cornwall: Periscope Publishing. ISBN 978-1-904381-36-5.
- Piouffre, Gérard (2009). Le Titanic ne répond plus (in French). Paris: Larousse. ISBN 978-2-03-584196-4.
- Riffenburgh, Beau (2008). Toute l'histoire du Titanic (in French). Sélection du Reader's Digest. ISBN 978-2-7098-1982-4.
