= Marconi International Marine Communication Company =

British maritime communications company

- Industry: Maritime communications
- Founded: 25 April 1900; 126 years ago
- Founder: Guglielmo Marconi
- Defunct: 20 December 2002
- Fate: Merged with Selenia Marine Company; dissolved 2017
- Successor: Marconi Selenia Marine Company
- Headquarters: London, United Kingdom
- Parent: Marconi Company

The Marconi International Marine Communication Company, also referred to as Marconi Marine, was a maritime communications company and a subsidiary of the Marconi Company. Founded in 1900, the company installed high-powered coastal stations, and provided wireless sets for British merchant ships as well as trained radio operators to work them.

== Background and foundation ==
The British Marconi Company was formed in 1897 by Guglielmo Marconi with the object of providing regular telegraphic services both nationally and internationally. Prior to the founding of Marconi Marine, the company asked for a licence from the British General Post Office to set up shore stations which was denied. Since there was no requirement of a licence to set up stations prior to 1904, at their own expense, the company set up 12 shore stations "without any Government licence, contract, agreement or assurance of any kind."

In 1900, Marconi and representatives from Britain, Germany, France, Belgium, and Spain, got together to form the Marconi Marine Company with the aim to "add to the safety and security of the vast fleets of passenger and trading vessels navigating all seas; but it may reasonably be anticipated that it will be the means of creating a sea telegraph business which will add considerably to the revenue of the existing Government telegraphs."

In 1909, the company and the Postmaster General, Sydney Buxton, came to an agreement where all the coastal stations would be transferred under the authority of the Post Office.

== Merger and fold up ==
Marconi Marine folded in 2002, merging with the Selenia Marine Company which was renamed as Marconi Selenia Marine Company until reverting back to Selenia Marine in 2004 before ultimately dissolving in 2017.

== Gallery ==
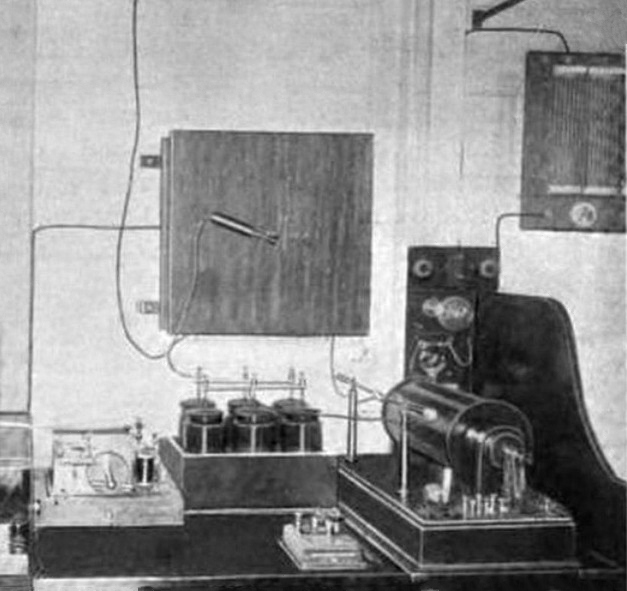
Spark-gap transmitter on board the SS Minnetonka, c. 1902

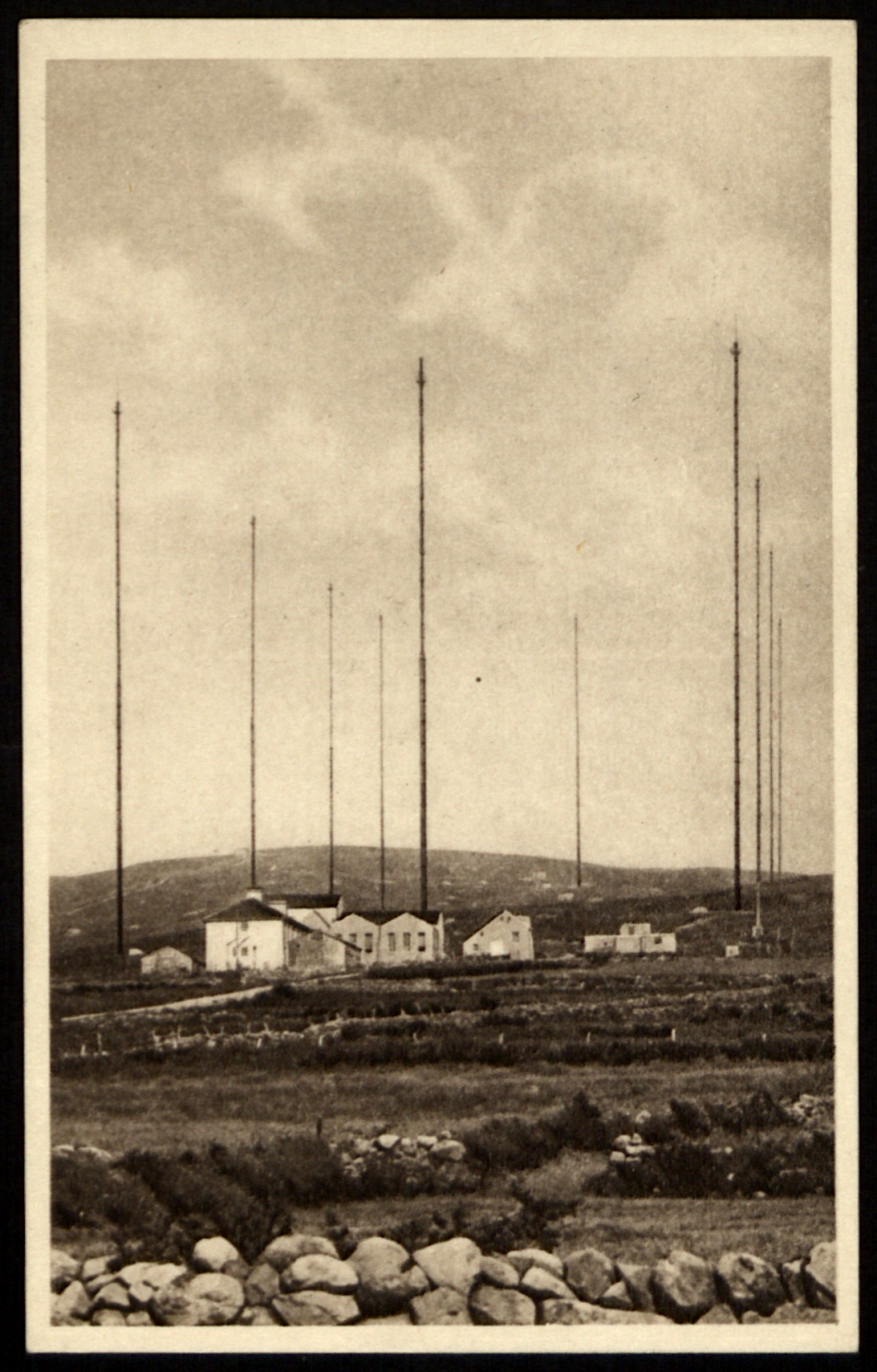
Marconi coastal station in Carnarvon, Wales

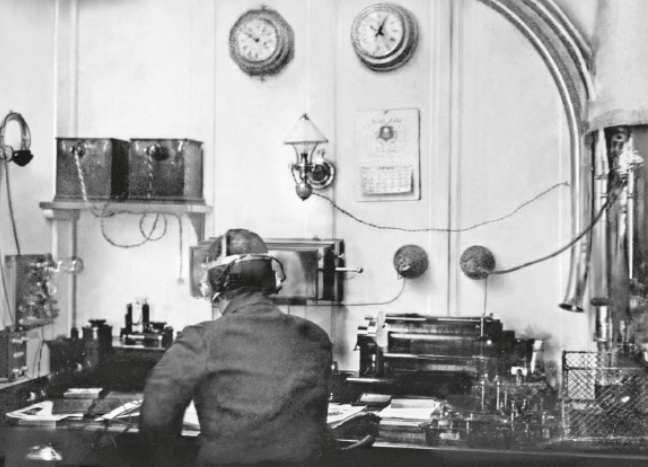
The Marconi wireless room aboard the RMS Titanic, with Second operator Harold Bride on watch

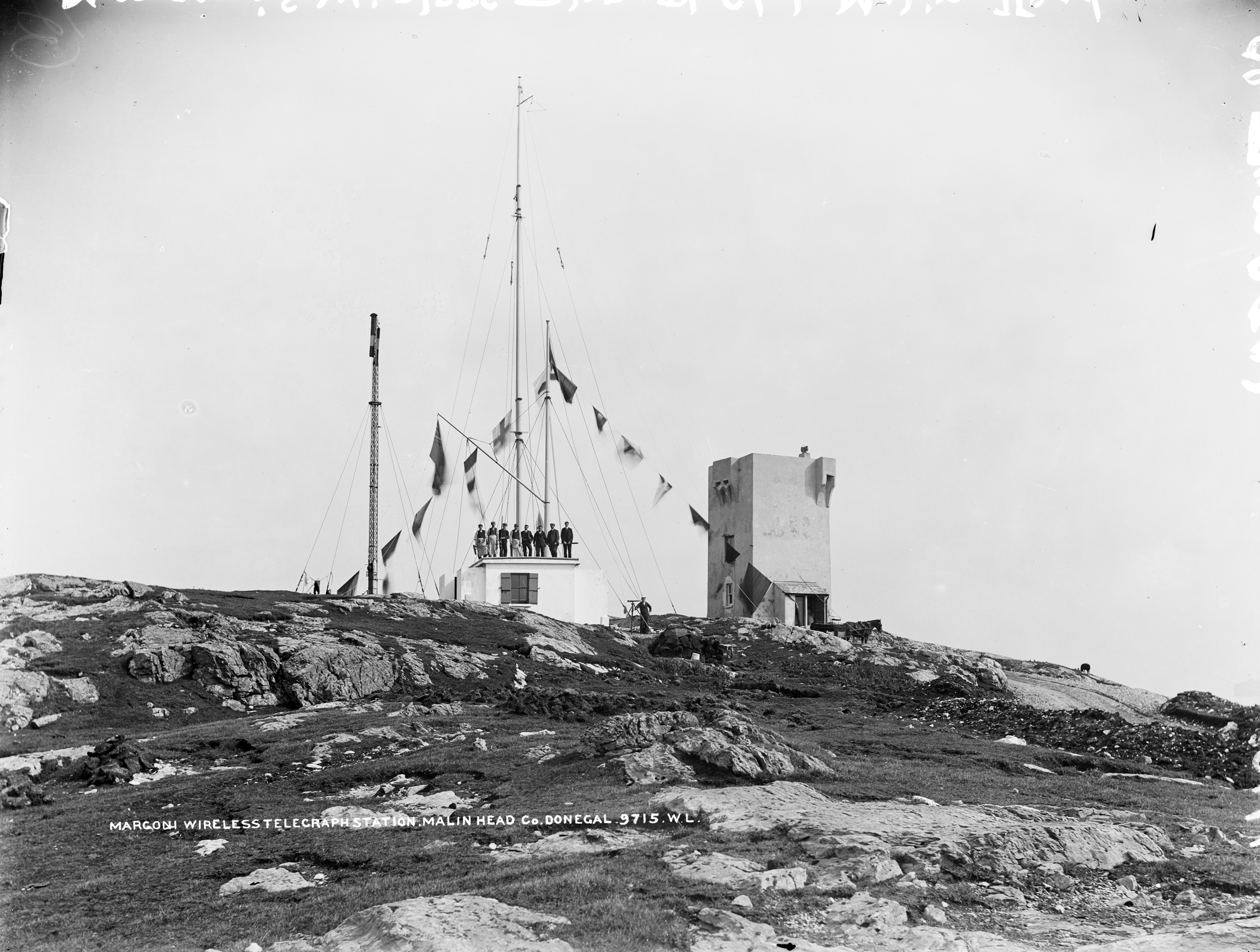
Marconi coastal station in Malin Head, Ireland, c. 1902

== See also ==
- Maritime call sign
- List of Marconi wireless stations

== Sources ==
- Hancock, H. E. (1950). Wireless At Sea: The First Fifty Years (PDF). Marconi Marine.
