= A Night to Remember (1958 film) =

1958 British film about Titanic by Roy Ward Baker

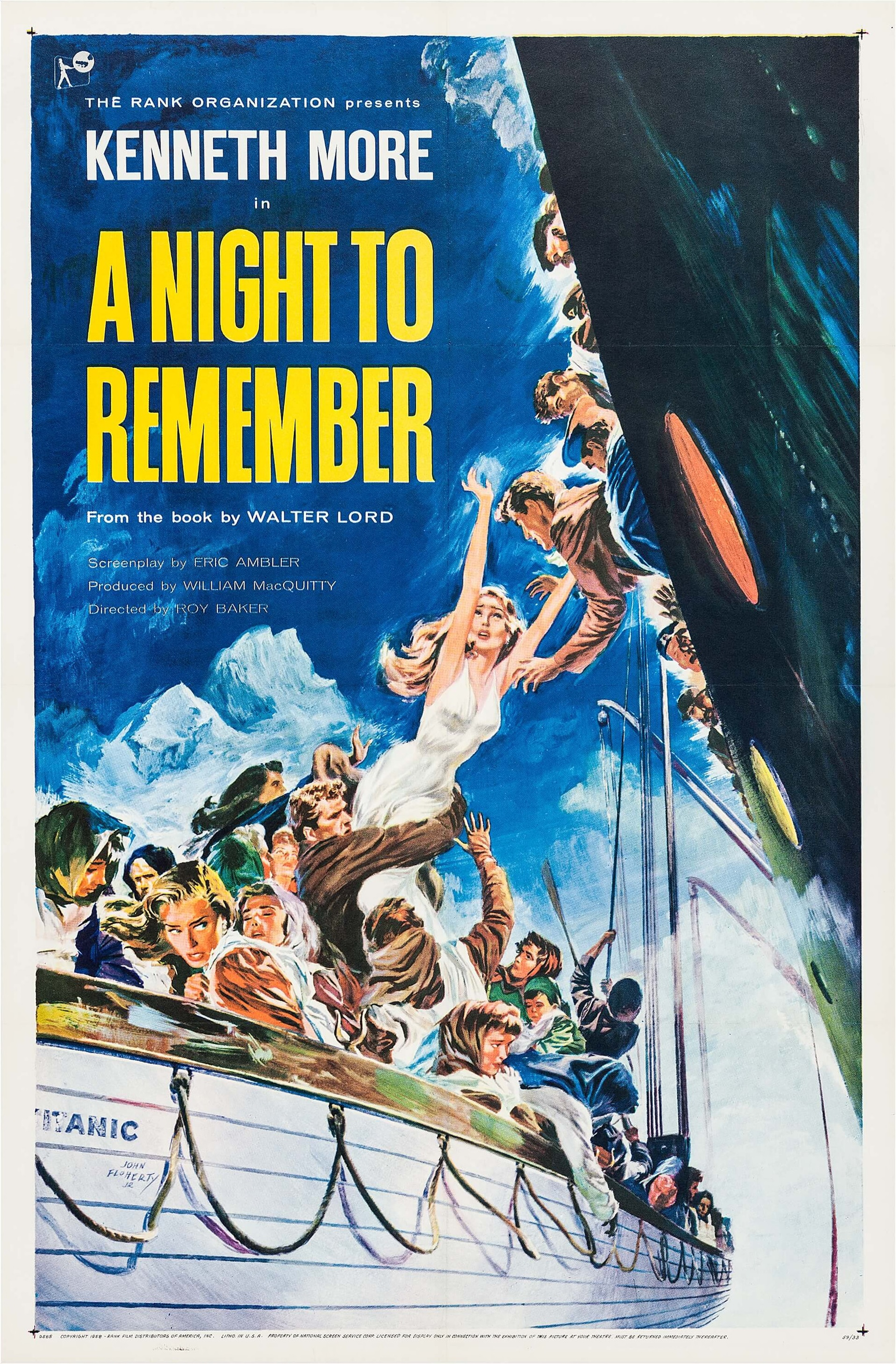
- Theatrical release poster
- Directed by: Roy Ward Baker
- Screenplay by: Eric Ambler
- Based on: A Night to Remember; 1955 book by Walter Lord
- Produced by: William MacQuitty
- Starring: Kenneth More; Michael Goodliffe; Laurence Naismith; Kenneth Griffith; David McCallum; Tucker McGuire
- Cinematography: Geoffrey Unsworth
- Edited by: Sidney Hayers
- Music by: William Alwyn
- Distributed by: The Rank Organisation
- Release date: 3 July 1958
- Running time: 123 minutes
- Country: United Kingdom
- Language: English
- Budget: £500–600,000

A Night to Remember is a 1958 British historical disaster film, directed by Roy Ward Baker. It is adapted from the 1955 book by Walter Lord, about the sinking of the RMS Titanic on 15 April 1912, after it struck an iceberg on her maiden voyage. Written by Eric Ambler, the film depicts the events of the night in a documentary style in considerable detail. It stars Kenneth More as the ship's Second Officer Charles Lightoller and features Michael Goodliffe, Laurence Naismith, Kenneth Griffith, David McCallum and Tucker McGuire.

A Night to Remember was filmed at Pinewood Studios from October 1957 to March 1958. The production team, supervised by producer William MacQuitty, used blueprints of the ship to create authentic sets, while Fourth Officer Joseph Boxhall and ex-Cunard Commodore Harry Grattidge worked as technical advisors on the film. Its estimated budget of up to £600,000 made it the most expensive film made in Britain up to that time. The film's score was written by William Alwyn.

Released on 3 July 1958, A Night to Remember disappointed at the box office. However, the film was widely praised for its sets, soundtrack, cinematography, historical accuracy and performances; it won the 1959 Samuel Goldwyn International Award at the Golden Globe Awards. Among the many films about the Titanic, A Night to Remember is regarded highly by Titanic historians and survivors for its accuracy, despite its modest production values compared with the 1997 film Titanic.

== Plot ==
On 10 April 1912, the luxurious RMS Titanic, the largest vessel afloat, and widely believed to be unsinkable, sails from Southampton on her maiden voyage to New York. On 14 April, in the Atlantic, the ship receives a number of ice warnings from steamers, which are relayed to Captain Edward Smith, who orders a lookout. That evening, the SS Californian spots floating ice in the distance and tries to send a warning via telegraph to Titanic. On Titanic, first class passengers Sir Richard and Lady Richard, and second class passengers the Clarkes, a young newlywed couple, overhear the band, led by Wallace Hartley, play, while steerage passengers Pat Murphy, Martin Gallagher, and James Farrel enjoy a party in third class, where Murphy dances with a young Polish girl. In the telegraph room, operators Jack Phillips and Harold Bride are changing shifts. Phillips receives the warning but fails to decipher it properly due to the massive pile of unsent messages left by Bride. On the Californian, field ice is spotted. The ship stops due to the risk, and a second warning is sent to Titanic. Overworked and irritated, Phillips cuts the message off early. Second Officer Charles Lightoller gives charge of the bridge to First Officer William Murdoch. Titanic's passengers begin to settle in for the night, while gamblers Hoyle and Jay Yates stay up.

Suddenly, the lookouts spot an iceberg dead ahead; despite Murdoch's evasive action, the ship collides with it. Captain Smith sends for Thomas Andrews, the ship's builder, to inspect the damage; Andrews determines the ship has suffered a 300-foot gash, opening five of her compartments to the ocean. Andrews informs Smith that the Titanic will sink in one-and-a-half hours, and both realise that the ship lacks sufficient lifeboat capacity for all the passengers. Distress signals are sent out but the Californian's wireless operator is off duty. Fifty-eight miles away, the RMS Carpathia's wireless operator receives the distress call and alerts Captain Arthur Rostron, who orders his ship to turn around. Unfortunately, it will take about four hours to reach the Titanic. Seeing the Californian on the horizon ten miles away, Titanic begins to signal the ship, but the Californian's crew fails to comprehend why a ship within sight is firing rockets. Captain Smith orders Lightoller to start lowering the lifeboats, while the orchestra performs ragtime. In the Grand Staircase, passenger Robbie Lucas is told the truth by Andrews, so he gets his wife and children safely into a boat. Murphy, Gallagher and Farrel help the Polish girl and her mother to the boat deck and get them to a boat. The Richards and Hoyle (whose unease convinced him to leave the poker game and save himself) are admitted to a boat by Murdoch. Yates gives a female passenger a note to send to his sister. Ida and Isidor Straus refuse to be separated, inadvertently setting an example for Mrs Clarke, who decides to stay with her husband until Andrews advises them on how to survive.

As the crew struggles to hold back the third-class passengers, most first- and second-class passengers board lifeboats and row away. As Titanic lists, passengers begin to realise the danger; when the third-class passengers finally storm the deck, chaos ensues. White Star Line Chairman J. Bruce Ismay steps into one of the last lifeboats. Passengers—among them Murphy, Gallagher and Farrel—retreat towards the stern as it rises into the air, while Lightoller and other able seamen struggle to free the two remaining collapsible lifeboats as the Titanic's bow submerges. Captain Smith gives the final order through his megaphone, "Abandon ship! Every man for himself!" The Clarkes use a rope to lower themselves over the ship's side as the orchestra performs the hymn, "Nearer, My God, to Thee" and Smith returns to the bridge to go down with his ship. Titanic begins her final plunge; Lightoller and many others are swept off. Andrews awaits his end in the first-class smoking room, while a steward comforts a lost boy. Lucas looks out towards the lifeboats, knowing he will never see his family again, while the Clarkes are killed by a falling funnel. The passengers pray as the stricken liner finally sinks into the ocean.

In the icy water, many passengers die of hypothermia. Lucas's dead body floats by an overturned collapsible, as Yates, unwilling to overcrowd the boat, swims away to his death. Lightoller takes charge on the boat as Murphy and Gallagher make it aboard, although Farrel is lost. Chief Baker (Charles Joughin) after having given up his lifeboat seat and turning to the bottle to ease his ailments, also climbs aboard. The men are saved by another boat. Carpathia arrives to rescue the survivors, as Lightoller tells Colonel Archibald Gracie, "I don't think I'll ever feel sure again, about anything". On the ship, as a group prayer is held, Murphy and Gallagher stand with the Polish girl and her mother, while Mrs Farrel and Mrs Lucas mourn the loss of their husbands. As Carpathia sails by the floating wreckage from the Titanic, Rostron tells Lightoller that 705 were saved and 1,500 lost. Carpathia receives a message from the Californian asking what can be done to help but Rostron sends back that "everything that was humanly possible has been done".

== Cast ==
- Kenneth More as Second Officer Charles Lightoller
- Michael Goodliffe as shipbuilder Thomas Andrews
- Laurence Naismith as Captain Edward Smith
- Kenneth Griffith as Wireless Operator Jack Phillips
- David McCallum as Assistant Wireless Operator Harold Bride
- Tucker McGuire as Mrs Margaret "Molly" Brown
- Frank Lawton as chairman and managing director of the White Star Line J. Bruce Ismay
- Richard Leech as First Officer William McMaster Murdoch
- John Cairney as Mr Murphy
- Richard Clarke as Martin Gallagher
- Patrick McAlinney as Mr James Farrell
- Anthony Bushell as Captain Arthur Rostron
- Alec McCowen as Wireless Operator Harold Cottam, RMS Carpathia
- Ronald Allen as Mr Clarke
- Jill Dixon as Mrs Clarke
- Geoffrey Bayldon as Wireless Operator Cyril Evans, SS Californian
- George Rose as Chief Baker Charles Joughin
- John Merivale as Robbie Lucas
- Honor Blackman as Mrs Liz Lucas
- Robert Ayres as Arthur Peuchen
- Ralph Michael as Jay Yates
- James Dyrenforth as Colonel Archibald Gracie IV
- Russell Napier as Captain Stanley Lord
- Jane Downs as Iowa Sylvania Zillah "Sylvia" Hawley-Wilson (Mrs Sylvia Lightoller)
- Patrick Waddington as Sir Richard
- Harriette Johns as Lady Richard
- Redmond Phillips as Mr Hoyle
- Joseph Tomelty as Dr William O'Loughlin
- Jack Watling as Fourth Officer Joseph Boxhall
- Michael Bryant as Sixth Officer James Paul Moody
- Howard Lang as Chief Officer Henry Tingle Wilde (uncredited)
- Dennis Carnell as Third Officer Herbert Pitman (uncredited)
- Cyril Chamberlain as Quartermaster Rowe
- Bee Duffell as Mrs Farrell
- Harold Goldblatt as Benjamin Guggenheim
- Gerald Harper as Third Officer, RMS Carpathia
- Robert Raglan as Chief Engineer Johnston, RMS Carpathia
- Thomas Heathcote as Steward
- Andrew Keir as Second Engineer Officer John Henry 'Harry' Hesketh
- Howard Pays as Fifth Officer Harold Lowe
- Harold Siddons as Second Officer Herbert Stone, SS Californian
- Julian Somers as Mr Bull
- Rosamund Greenwood as Mrs Bull (uncredited)
- Arthur Gross as Quartermaster Hichens (uncredited)
- Charles Belchier as Bandleader Wallace Hartley (uncredited)
- Emerton Court as Chief Engineer Joseph Bell (uncredited)
- Teresa Thorne as Miss Edith Russell (uncredited)
- John Moulder-Brown as boy (uncredited)
- Henry Campbell as W. T. Stead (uncredited)
- Larry Taylor as bearded seaman (uncredited)
- Alma Taylor as old woman who leaves her seat to a young mother on the lifeboat (uncredited)
- Ray Austin as seaman (high fall into water stunt) (uncredited)
- Edward Malin as Dining Saloon Steward
- John Martin as Lost Boy (uncredited)
- Victor Wood as Steward (uncredited)
- Richard Shaw as Crewman (uncredited)
- Sean Connery as Deckhand (uncredited)
- Jack Stewart as Stoker Barrett (uncredited)
- Olwen Brookes as Miss Evans (uncredited)
- Paul Hardwick as Guggenheim's Valet (uncredited)
- Peter Sallis as Minor Role (uncredited)

Cast notes:

- Kenneth More, Laurence Naismith, Michael Goodliffe, and Russell Napier all featured later in Sink the Bismarck!.
- Kenneth More, and Jack Watling had previously acted together in Reach for the Sky.
- Gordon Holdom - baritone, sang the song "Nearer, My God, to Thee" dubbed.
- Bernard Fox, who portrays Lookout Frederick Fleet, would later portray Colonel Archibald Gracie IV in Titanic (1997).
- Larry Taylor's son, stuntman and actor Rocky Taylor made an uncredited appearance as Bert Cartmell, a 3rd class passenger and Cora's dad in Titanic (1997).
- Four members of the cast, Peter Burton, Desmond Llewelyn, Geoffrey Bayldon and Alec McCowen, went on to play "Q" in various James Bond movies. In this film, they respectively portrayed a first class steward, a gate steward who prevents the third class passengers from entering the first class deck, SS Californian Wireless Operator Cyril Evans, and RMS Carpathia Wireless Operator Harold Cottam.
- Two cast members – Llewelyn and Blackman – would later appear in the 1964 James Bond film Goldfinger, with Blackman as Pussy Galore.
- Norman Rossington, who portrays a steward who loses his temper with a non-English speaking passenger during the start of the evacuation, would later portray the Master-at-Arms in S.O.S. Titanic (1979).
- Jeremy Bulloch, best known for his portrayal of Boba Fett in the Star Wars films The Empire Strikes Back and Return of the Jedi, makes an uncredited appearance as a boy jumping into the water.
- Derren Nesbitt and Stratford Johns appear uncredited as survivors on the upturned lifeboat.
- Frank Lawton, who plays J. Bruce Ismay, previously starred in 1933's Cavalcade, which also prominently featured the Titanic.
- This is the last movie for Alma Taylor, a very famous actress in Silent film era.
- David McCallum, who plays Harold Bride, would serve as the narrator for the 1994 A&E documentary mini-series Titanic: Death of a Dream and Titanic: The Legend Lives On.
- Richard Leech, who portrays First Officer Murdoch, later appeared in the 1982 film Gandhi with Bernard Hill, who would play Captain Edward J. Smith in Titanic (1997).

== Production ==
The film is based on Walter Lord's book A Night to Remember (1955). In Ray Johnson's documentary The Making of 'A Night to Remember' (1993), Lord says that when he wrote his book, there was no mass interest in the Titanic, and he was the first writer in four decades to attempt a grand history of the disaster, synthesising written sources and survivors' first-hand accounts. Lord dated the genesis of his interest in the subject to childhood as did producer MacQuitty, who had vivid memories of, as a boy of six, watching the launch of the Titanic at the Harland and Wolff shipyard in Belfast on 31 May 1911 and seeing it depart on its maiden voyage the following April.

The book had been adapted as a live American TV production, screened by NBC and sponsored by Kraft Foods as part of the Kraft Television Theatre series on 28 March 1956. It was described as "the biggest, most lavish, most expensive thing of its kind" attempted up to that point, with 31 sets, 107 actors, 72 speaking parts, and 3,000 gallons of water and costing $95,000 ($860,000 at 2025 prices). George Roy Hill directed and Claude Rains narrated – a practice borrowed from radio dramas, which provided a template for many television dramas of the time. It took a similar approach to the book, lacking dominant characters and switching between a multiplicity of scenes. Rains's narration was used "to bridge the almost limitless number of sequences of life aboard the doomed liner", as a reviewer put it and closed with his declaration that "never again has Man been so confident. An age had come to an end." The production was a major hit, attracting 28 million viewers, and greatly boosted the book's sales. It was rerun on kinescope on 2 May 1956, five weeks after its first broadcast.

=== Development ===
The film adaptation came about after its eventual director, Roy Ward Baker, and its producer, Belfast-born William MacQuitty, both acquired copies of the book – Baker from his favourite bookshop and MacQuitty from his wife – and decided to obtain the film rights. MacQuitty succeeded in raising finance from John Davis at the Rank Organisation, who in the late 1950s were expanding into bigger-budgeted film making. The job of directing was assigned to Roy Baker, who was under contract to Rank, and Baker recommended Ambler be given the job of writing the screenplay. Lord was brought on board as a consultant.

In addition to basing the script – both in action and dialogue – on Lord's book, the film makers achieved nuanced performances and authentic atmosphere by consulting Titanic survivors, who served as technical advisors. Among them were Fourth Officer Joseph Boxhall and passengers Edith Russell and Lawrence Beesley. Beesley was asked to sit by a tape recorder in a caravan at Pinewood Studios and imitate the cries of the struggling swimmers after the sinking. The film makers went out of their way to cast actors who resembled their real life counterparts. Charles Lightoller's widow Sylvia was also consulted during production, at one point visiting Pinewood Studios and meeting with Kenneth More, whom she introduced to her children on set. Sylvia commended More for his portrayal of her husband. When Helen Smith, Captain Smith's daughter, visited the set and met Laurence Naismith, she was overcome with emotion by his striking physical resemblance to her father.

There were numerous changes made to real events to increase the drama and appeal. For example, there is a limited involvement of American passengers (with the exception of the Strauses, Guggenheim, "the unsinkable" Molly Brown and Colonel Gracie), and several characters based on Americans are depicted as being British. When questioned as to why he did this, Roy Baker noted that "it was a British film made by British artists for a British audience". The film diverges from the book and the NBC TV adaptation in focusing on a central character, Second Officer Charles Lightoller, who performs actions that other crew members did and said during the disaster. Its conclusion reflects Lord's world-historical theme of a "world changed forever" with a fictional conversation between Lightoller and Colonel Archibald Gracie, sitting on a lifeboat. Lightoller declares that the disaster is "different ... Because we were so sure. Because even though it's happened, it's still unbelievable. I don't think I'll ever feel sure again. About anything". Rank wanted a star for the part, so it was offered to Kenneth More, who accepted. It was the first film that he made under a new contract with Rank to make seven films in five years for a fee of £40,000 per film (about £1,141,000 in 2024 terms, with a total of £6,600,000 for all seven).

Producer MacQuitty had originally contracted with Shaw, Savill & Albion Line to use its former flagship QSMV Dominion Monarch to shoot scenes, but the company pulled out at the last minute, citing that they did not want to use one of their liners to recreate the Titanic sinking. According to MacQuitty, the Shaw Savill Line at the time was managed by Basil Sanderson, son of Harold Sanderson, the White Star Line's deputy chairman. Harold Sanderson would later succeed J. Bruce Ismay as president of the International Mercantile Marine Company, J.P. Morgan's shipping conglomerate that owned the White Star Line. Basil Sanderson was also married to Ismay's daughter. This connection to White Star, according to MacQuitty, is what actually led the Shaw Savill Line to pull out. MacQuitty eventually got permission from Ship Breaking Industries in Faslane, Scotland to film scenes aboard RMS Asturias, a 1920s ocean liner that the company was scrapping. The liner's port side had been demolished, but its starboard was still intact, so MacQuitty got art students to paint the liner the White Star Line colours and used mirrors to recreate scenes that took place on the port side. Thirty sets were constructed using the builders' original plans for Titanic.

=== Filming ===
Filming began on 15 October 1957 at Pinewood Studios, until 5 March 1958. When the set was being raised at an angle, the microphones picked up the sounds of the set creaking. The director kept them in the sinking scenes because they made the scenes more realistic. The last shot to be filmed was Sir Richard and Lady Richard's departure from their home past the waving orphans, according to Ray Johnson's documentary The Making of 'A Night to Remember' (1993).

Kenneth More recalled the production of the film in his autobiography, published twenty years later in 1978. There was no tank big enough at Pinewood Studios to film the survivors struggling to climb into lifeboats, so it was done in the open-air swimming bath at Ruislip Lido, at 2:00 a.m. on an icy November morning. When the extras refused to jump in, More realised he would have to set an example. He called out: "Come on!".

I leaped. Never have I experienced such cold in all my life. It was like jumping into a deep freeze. The shock forced the breath out of my body. My heart seemed to stop beating. I felt crushed, unable to think. I had rigor mortis, without the mortis. And then I surfaced, spat out the dirty water and, gasping for breath, found my voice. "Stop!" I shouted. "Don't listen to me! It's bloody awful! Stay where you are!" But it was too late...

Four clips from the Nazi propaganda film Titanic (1943) were used in A Night to Remember; two of the ship sailing in calm waters during the day, and two of a flooding walkway in the engine room. As Brian Hawkins writes, the British came closest "to the Titanic truth in 1958 with their black-and-white production of Walter Lord's novel A Night to Remember, seamlessly incorporating sequences from director Herbert Selpin's 1943 (Nazi) Titanic without giving any screen credits for these incredible scenes". Selpin was arrested on the instruction of Propaganda Minister Joseph Goebbels during production in early August 1942, for offering a negative opinion of the German military while directing this earlier Nazi-era film. He was then found dead in his prison cell.

== Historical accuracy ==
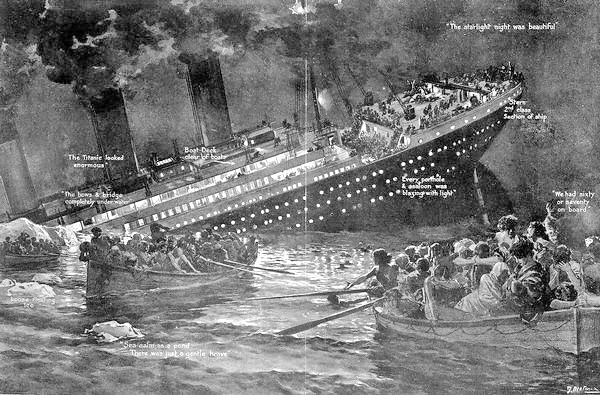
Illustration of the sinking of the Titanic

The film has a reputation of being regarded as the most historically accurate portrayal of the Titanic disaster. One notable obvious inaccuracy is that the ship sinks intact; this was because it was the accepted view at the time despite survivor testimonies. This was disproved when the wreck was found in 1985.^{α} Charles Lightoller's widow Sylvia praised the film's historical accuracy in an interview with The Guardian, stating "The film is really the truth and has not been embroidered".

While some events are based on history, some of the characters and their stories are fictional or dramatised; the characters of Mr Murphy, Mr Hoyle, and Jay Yates being composites of several men. Murphy, who leads the steerage girls to the lifeboat, is a composite of several Irish emigrants. Although there was a Martin Gallagher travelling steerage aboard the Titanic, his actions in the film are fictional and although he survives the sinking, he died in real life. Hoyle, the gambler who gets into the lifeboat on the starboard side, is a composite of several such figures, men determined to save themselves at all costs. Robbie Lucas and Mrs Liz Lucas are composites of several married couples, notably Mr Lucian Smith and Mrs Eloise Hughes Smith. Lucas even says the words actually spoken by Lucien Smith to his wife: "I never expected to ask you to obey me, but this is one time you must". Mr Clarke and Mrs Clarke are composites of several honeymoon couples, notably John and Sarah Chapman, a pair of newlyweds from second class who died in the sinking. John Chapman's body was recovered by the cable ship Mackay-Bennett, and there were no mentions or indications that suggest that he had been killed by a falling funnel. The involvement of American passengers was either limited or left out (with the exception of the Strauses, Guggenheim, Margaret Brown and Colonel Gracie).

Several historical figures were renamed or went unnamed to avoid potential legal action. Sir Cosmo Duff-Gordon and Lucy, Lady Duff-Gordon are depicted as Sir Richard and Lady Richard (Lady Duff's secretary Miss Francatelli is omitted) and Bruce Ismay is referred to throughout only as "The Chairman". The film omits several historical figures, including John Jacob Astor IV, the wealthiest passenger aboard the Titanic, and stoker Frederick Barrett, with Second Engineer Officer John Henry Hesketh's role being expanded to include duties and actions that were performed by Barrett and others.

The American gambler Jay Yates (played as British by the distinctive British actor Ralph Michael), travelling under the name of J.H. Rogers, was never on board and the note he was said to have handed to a passenger was a hoax. Yates wrote the note in New York and then had a woman accomplice pose as a survivor and deliver the note to the newspaper. Yates did this to make the police think he was dead. The ruse failed and Yates was captured a couple of months later (he was wanted on federal charges connected with postal thefts). The fictional Yates says, "Good luck and God bless you", the words spoken by an unknown swimmer at Collapsible B, whom survivor fireman Walter Hurst thought was Captain Smith.

The first scene of A Night to Remember depicts the christening of the ship at its launch. The Titanic was never christened, as it was not the practice of the White Star Line to stage this sort of ceremony. This has come down in popular lore as one of the many contributing factors to the ship's "bad luck".

While describing the damage, Thomas Andrews states that a 300-foot long gash had been opened in the hull. While the damage indeed covered an area of 300 feet, it was due to a series of smaller incisions along the hull plates (the largest around 40 feet), rather than a single, continuous tear. If Titanic suffered this kind of damage, she would have sunk, likely capsizing, within minutes instead of nearly 3 hours.

The painting in the first class smoking room is incorrectly shown as depicting the entrance to New York Harbor, while it actually depicted the entrance to Plymouth Sound, which Titanic had been expected to visit on her return voyage (there was a painting of New York Harbor at this spot on RMS Olympic, a sister ship of Titanic). This was an error made by Walter Lord in his research, which he acknowledged in the documentary The Making of A Night to Remember.

Stanley Lord was upset over his negative portrayal; he was depicted wearing pyjamas and as being asleep in his cabin while the Titanic was sinking. In fact, Lord was sleeping in the chart room wearing his uniform. The film gives the impression second officer Lightoller had launched almost every lifeboat. Actions that were actually performed by others were attributed to Lightoller. Lightoller is also depicted as nearly being crushed by the fourth funnel falling in the ship's last moments; it was actually the first funnel that fell near him.

Murphy and Gallagher make it to the overturned Collapsible B with a child in their arms, which they pass to Lightoller. Lightoller finds the child is dead and puts it back in the water. This was based on accounts that Captain Smith reportedly carried a child to the boat, which later died; along with these accounts being of dubious nature, Lightoller never reported receiving a child on Collapsible B. Third-Class passenger Victor Francis Sunderland, who survived on board Collapsible B, strongly criticised the adaptation of Lord's book, as well as several accounts by Lord. Sunderland gave his own version of the events in a narration and a later interview with The Toronto Star.

== Reception ==
=== Critical reception ===
After its December 1958 US premiere, Bosley Crowther called the film a "tense, exciting and supremely awesome drama...[that] puts the story of the great disaster in simple human terms and yet brings it all into a drama of monumental unity and scope"; according to Crowther,

this remarkable picture is a brilliant and moving account of the behavior of the people on the Titanic on that night that should never be forgotten. It is an account of the casualness and flippancy of most of the people right after the great ship has struck (even though an ominous cascade of water is pouring into her bowels); of the slow accumulation of panic that finally mounts to a human holocaust, of shockingly ugly bits of baseness and of wonderfully brave and noble deeds.

The film won numerous awards, including a Golden Globe Award for Best English-Language Foreign Film, and received high praise from reviewers on both sides of the Atlantic.

=== Box office ===
The film was one of the twenty most popular films of the year in Britain according to Motion Picture Herald, but it was only a modest commercial success due to the size of its original budget and its relative underperformance at the American box office. Kinematograph Weekly listed it as being "in the money" at the British box office in 1958. By 2001, it had still not made a profit, in part because it was issued as part of a slate of ten films and all of its profits were cross-collateralised. Filmink called the film "a tribute to the whole Rank Organisation" and its relatively disappointing "financial performance must have shattered the studio."

=== Reputation today ===
According to Professor Paul Heyer, the film helped to spark the wave of disaster films that included The Poseidon Adventure (1972) and The Towering Inferno (1974). Heyer comments that it "still stands as the definitive cinematic telling of the story and the prototype and finest example of the disaster-film genre". On the review aggregator website Rotten Tomatoes, the film has a score of 100% based on 23 critical reviews and a 91% value according to audience responses. It is considered "the best Titanic film before Titanic (1997)", "the most accurate of all Titanic films", and "the definitive Titanic tale", especially for its social realism, reflecting, in the words of one critic, "the overwhelming historical evidence that the class rigidity of 1912, for all its defects, produced a genuine sense of behavioural obligation on the Titanic among rich and poor alike; that the greatest number of people aboard faced death or hardship with a stoic and selfless grace that the world has wondered at for most of this century". Film critic Barry Norman called it "more moving" than Titanic (1997). Andrew Collins of Empire gave the film five out of five, writing that "this is a landmark in British cinema, as good today as it's always been". Catherine Shoard of The Guardian gave the film four out of five, saying "A restrained, nearly austere ensemble drama that manages to intertwine a dozen different stories without tripping up on any of them, it relies on real-life survivor testimony for almost every line and incident, to immensely moving and dignified effect." Similarly, John Patterson praised the film for "the crispness and intelligence of its writing and direction". Filmink argued this was the best film Kenneth More ever starred in.

Titanic experts Fitch, Layton and Wormstedt describe the film as a huge step forward in terms of correctness compared to previous films about the disaster.

The film was also a masterpiece in that it did not use a fictional plot and primary characters to draw audiences in; instead, it primarily relied upon historical figures and showed them in such a way that audiences cared about what happened to them.

== Home video ==
A Night to Remember was released by the Criterion Collection on DVD in May 1998, in the wake of the release of Titanic (1997)". Initial versions of the DVD omitted Lightoller finding the child to be dead and putting it in the water. A new DVD and a high-definition Blu-ray edition were released on 27 March 2012 to commemorate the centenary of the sinking.

== See also ==
- 1958 in film
- Historical drama
- List of films about the Titanic
  - Titanic in popular culture
- Selected filmography of Geoffrey Unsworth

== Notes ==
^{α} - the wreck in the 1980 film Raise the Titanic was also portrayed as intact

== Bibliography ==
- Aldridge, Rebecca (2008). The Sinking of the Titanic. New York: Infobase Publishing. ISBN 978-0-7910-9643-7.
- Anderson, D. Brian (2005). The Titanic in Print and on Screen. Jefferson, NC: McFarland & Company. ISBN 0-7864-1786-2.
- Barczewski, Stephanie (2006). Titanic: A Night Remembered. London: Continuum International Publishing Group. ISBN 978-1-85285-500-0.
- Barnes, Julian (2010). A History of the World in 10½ Chapters. London: Random House. ISBN 978-1-4090-8865-3.
- Biel, Steven (1996). Down with the Old Canoe. London: W.W. Norton & Company. ISBN 0-393-03965-X.
- Chirnside, Mark (2004). The Olympic-class ships : Olympic, Titanic, Britannic. Stroud, Gloucestershire: Tempus. ISBN 978-0-7524-2868-0.
- Eaton, John P.; Haas, Charles A. (1994). Titanic: Triumph and Tragedy. Wellingborough, Northamptonshire: Patrick Stephens. ISBN 978-1-85260-493-6.
- Heyer, Paul (2012). Titanic Century: Media, Myth, and the Making of a Cultural Icon. Santa Barbara, CA: ABC-CLIO. ISBN 978-0-313-39815-5.
- Lord, Walter (1988). The Night Lives On. London: Penguin Books. ISBN 978-0-670-81452-7.
- Mayer, Geoff (2004). Roy Ward Baker. Manchester University Press. ISBN 978-0-7190-6354-1.
- Rasor, Eugene L. (2001). The Titanic: Historiography and Annotated Bibliography. Westport, CT: Greenwood Publishing Group. ISBN 978-0-313-31215-1.
- Richards, Jeffrey (2001). Imperialism and Music: Britain, 1876–1953. Manchester: Manchester University Press. ISBN 978-0-7190-6143-1.
- Street, Sarah (2004). "Questions of Authenticity and Realism in A Night to Remember (1958)". In Bergfelder, Tim; Street, Sarah (eds.). The Titanic in myth and memory: representations in visual and literary culture. London: I.B. Tauris. ISBN 978-1-85043-431-3.
- Ward, Greg (2012). The Rough Guide to the Titanic. London: Rough Guides Ltd. ISBN 978-1-4053-8699-9.
- Winocour, Jack (1960). The Story of the Titanic as told by its Survivors. London: Dover Publications. ISBN 978-0-486-20610-3.
- Fitch, Tad; Layton, J. Kent; Wormstedt, Bill (2012). On A Sea of Glass: The Life & Loss of the R.M.S. Titanic. Amberley Books. ISBN 978-1848689275.
- Davenport-Hines, Richard (2012). Titanic Lives: Migrants and Millionaires, Conmen and Crew. UK: HarperCollins. ISBN 978-0-00-732164-3.
