= Harold Bride =

British radio telegraphist and Titanic survivor (1890–1956)

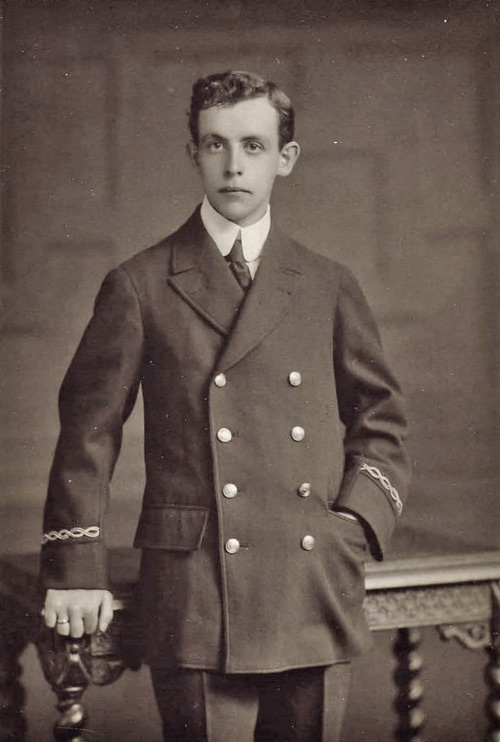
- Harold Bride, c. 1912
- Born: 11 January 1890; Nunhead, London, England
- Died: 29 April 1956 (aged 66); Glasgow, Scotland
- Occupation: Wireless operator
- Employer: Marconi International Marine Communication Company
- Known for: Second wireless operator of RMS Titanic
- Spouse: Lucy Johnstone Downie (m. 1920)
- Children: 3
- Military career
- Allegiance: United Kingdom
- Branch: Royal Naval Volunteer Reserve
- Conflicts: World War I
- Awards: Victory Medal; British War Medal

Harold Sidney Bride (11 January 1890 – 29 April 1956) was a British merchant seaman and wireless operator who served as the first operator aboard the RMS Titanic during her ill-fated maiden voyage.

After the Titanic struck an iceberg at 11:40 pm on 14 April 1912, Bride and his senior colleague, Jack Phillips, were responsible for relaying distress calls to ships within range and coordinating the rescue effort which led to survivors being picked up by the RMS Carpathia. The pair remained at their posts until the ship's power was almost completely out. Bride was washed off the ship as the boat deck flooded, but managed to scramble onto the upturned Collapsible B, and was rescued by Carpathia later in the morning. Despite injuring both his feet, he helped Harold Cottam, the Carpathia's wireless operator, transmit survivor lists and personal messages from the ship.

Bride continued working as a wireless operator after Titanic. He served in the Royal Naval Volunteer Reserve in World War I before returning briefly to the Marconi Company, leaving the mercantile service in 1922. Soon after his marriage, Bride moved his family to Scotland, where his wife was from. There, he worked as a pharmaceutical salesman and, in retirement, became the caretaker of Provan Hall for the National Trust of Scotland. He died of cancer in 1956.

== Early life ==
Bride was born in Nunhead, London, England, in 1890 to Mary Ann (née Lowe) and Arthur Bride. The youngest of five children, Bride lived with his family in Bromley. Between 1903 and 1922 the family lived in Ravensbourne Avenue, Shortlands.

After primary school, Bride decided he wanted to become a wireless operator and he worked in his family's business to help pay for training. He completed training for the Marconi International Marine Communication Company in July 1911. Working for Marconi, his first sea assignment as a wireless operator was on the SS Haverford; later he worked on the SS Lanfranc, the RMS Lusitania, and the SS Anselm. From the Anselm, he was transferred to RMS Titanic in March 1912.

== RMS Titanic ==
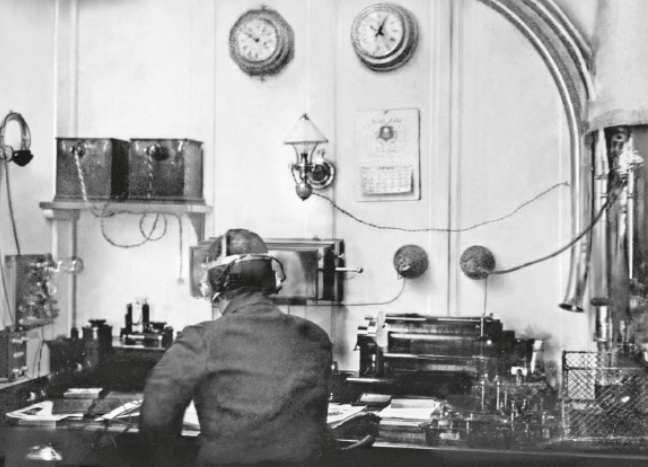
The Titanic's Marconi Room, with Bride on watch. Picture taken on 11 April 1912 by Francis Browne.

In 1912, Bride joined the crew of the RMS Titanic as the second wireless operator to chief operator Jack Phillips at Belfast, Ireland. (Note: Bride's rank aboard Titanic had different variations. He referred to himself as "Second operator" aboard the ship. At the inquiries, he was alternatively referred to as "Assistant operator" and "Junior operator." In the ship's articles, he was listed as "Telegraphist" while fellow crewmembers referred to him as "Marconi operator" and "Wireless operator.") During the ship's sea trials, the pair conducted their own tests with the wireless apparatus – which was the strongest set installed aboard a ship at the time – with the Malin Head and Seaforth wireless stations. Reportedly, they also heard signals as far away as Port Said and Tenerife. During the delivery trip to Southampton, the wireless operators transmitted the results of the trials to White Star Line offices in Liverpool and Southampton.

The Titanic left on her maiden voyage to New York City on 10 April. During the voyage, Bride and Phillips worked from the wireless room which was located on the boat deck, just behind the bridge and the officer's quarters. On 13 April, he helped Phillips repair the wireless machine which had broken down, and the pair managed to get the apparatus running again after six hours of work. Throughout the voyage, the pair received a number of navigational messages, including ice reports which were forwarded to the bridge. Bride testified later that he intercepted an ice report from the SS Californian which was being sent to the SS Antillian and that he subsequently delivered it to the bridge; this was, according to him, the only ice report he received while he was on watch.

=== The sinking ===
On the evening of 14 April, Bride had gone to bed early in preparation to relieve Phillips at midnight, two hours earlier than normal. When the Titanic struck the iceberg at 11:40 pm that night, Bride slept through the collision. He woke up shortly after, unaware of what had happened. Phillips told they had struck something and that ship had been damaged in some way; Bride acknowledged Phillips and began to get ready to go on duty. He had only just relieved Phillips of the watch when Captain Edward Smith soon came into the wireless room alerting Bride and Phillips to be ready to send out a distress signal. Shortly after midnight, Smith came in and told them to request help and gave them the ship's position. Bride then handed back the control of the wireless set to Phillips.

Phillips sent out CQD while Bride took messages to the Captain about which ships were coming to the Titanic's assistance. However, the closest ship to respond, the RMS Carpathia, would not reach the Titanic until after she sank. At one point Bride reminded Phillips that the new code was SOS and jokingly said, "Send SOS, it's the new call, and it may be your last chance to send it." Later Phillips took a quick break and Bride took over the wireless. Phillips soon returned to the wireless room reporting that the forward well deck was flooding. At that point, Bride handed control of the wireless back to Phillips who went back to work on the wireless machine.

The wireless power was almost out when Captain Smith arrived and told the men that they had done their duty and that they were relieved. Phillips got a call from Carpathia at that moment and continued working while, on Phillips' request, Bride gathered some money and personal belongings. When his back was turned a crew member had sneaked in and was taking Phillips' life vest. Bride forced the man away from Phillips, drawing the chief operator's attention and went to help Bride subdue the man. Soon after, they both abandoned the wireless room, leaving the motionless crewman where he fell. Bride thought the man was "a stoker, or someone from below decks". The men then split up, Bride heading atop the officer's quarters and Phillips heading aft. This was the last time Bride saw Phillips and the last confirmed sighting of Phillips.

Bride began helping remove one of the last two lifeboats, Collapsible B, off the roof of the officers' quarters. The crew was unable to launch the boat before it was washed off the deck upside down. Bride was also washed off the deck and soon climbed onto the boat, on which he and around 30 other people were able to survive. Throughout the night, under Second Officer Charles Lightoller's command, Bride and the others on the overturned lifeboat learned to shift their weight with swells to keep the boat afloat for as long as possible, although the collapsible was waterlogged and slowly sinking. Bride and the others on B were later assisted into other lifeboats, with him being bodily carried, and were eventually taken aboard the Carpathia.

=== Aboard the Carpathia ===
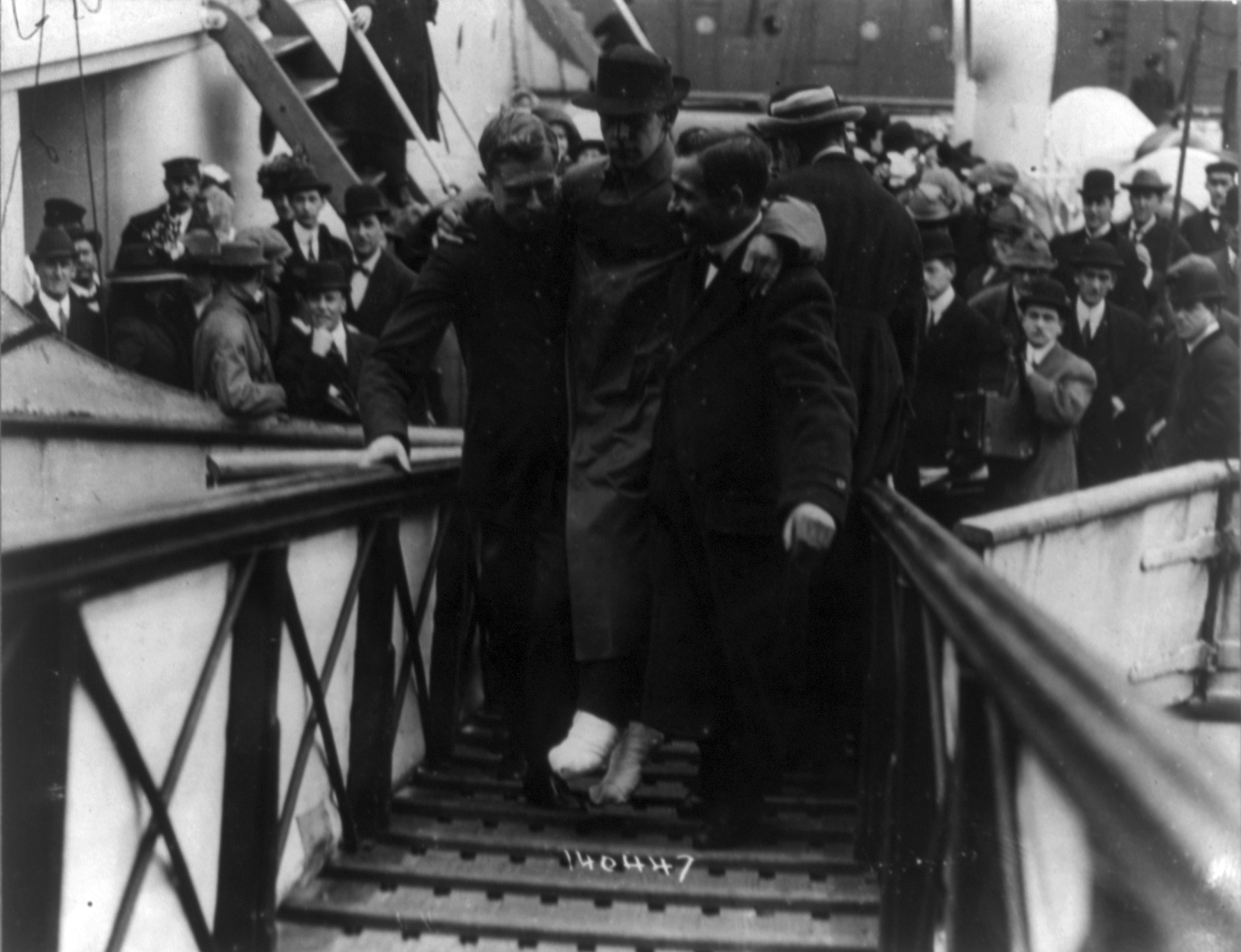
Bride being carried off the Carpathia, his badly frozen feet wrapped in thick bandages.

Upon reaching the Carpathia, Bride lost consciousness soon after being taken aboard and several of his fellow crewmembers expressed concerns that he might not survive. After waking up, he was taken to the ship's hospital for treatment on the injuries to his feet, one being badly sprained and both being frostbitten. Bride was later asked to help Carpathia's wireless operator, Harold Cottam, who had been awake since Sunday morning, in handling radio traffic. The pair sent out a large number of personal messages from the survivors, and also the list of survivors.

Upon reaching New York City, Bride initially stayed aboard the ship and continued to send messages. Marconi Company chairman Guglielmo Marconi boarded the ship in the morning and found Bride working in the wireless shack. Listening in for a while, Marconi finally interrupted and said, "That's hardly worth sending out now, boy." The chairman congratulated Bride on his survival and then introduced him to a New York Times reporter. (Note: It is not clear who this reporter was. Though often credited as being "Jim Speers", there is no record of such a journalist working at the Times. The more likely candidate is Isaac Russell who, in 1917, took credit for the story and was with the newspaper at the time.) Marconi authorized Bride to give his story to the Times as a gift to the operator who was paid $1,000 (equivalent to $33,400 in 2025) for his exclusive story, "Thrilling Story by Titanic's Surviving Wireless Man."

Bride alongside Harold Cottam, stayed with Bride's uncle, aunt and cousin, Walter, Mildred and Esther Jarvis at 294 West 92nd Street, New York City, Manhattan during the U.S. Senate inquiry for which he was subpoenaed, along with a number of other surviving crewmembers. While staying at the apartment, a New York Times reporter visited Bride and relayed dispatches from his father in London. Bride claimed he was happy they heard he was safe, and he sent them a telegram stating he was safe and being looked after. Bride then sent a message to his fiance Mabel Ludlow stating he was "Safe and Well".

== Titanic inquiries ==
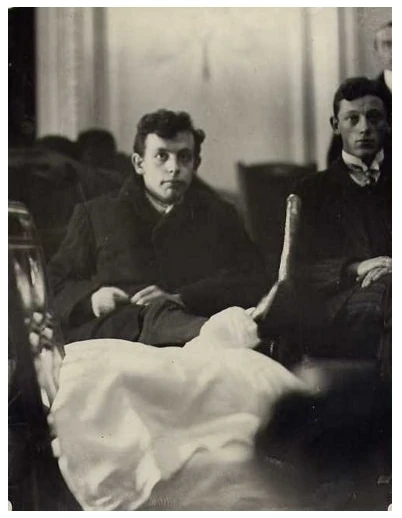
Bride sitting in wheelchair during the U.S. Senate inquiry into the Titanic disaster; just behind him is Harold Cottam, the wireless operator for the RMS Carpathia.

Bride later gave testimony in the American inquiry into the Titanic disaster, describing what iceberg warnings had been received and what had happened the night of the disaster. In the American inquiry, Bride was also questioned about ignoring requests for information, while on the Carpathia, from the press and the US Naval cruiser USS Chester, which wanted to know the fate of President William Howard Taft's personal friend and aide Archibald Butt. Bride stated that Captain Arthur Rostron had prohibited sending any messages other than those of the survivors to their families, though he also expressed frustration with the Chester's operator whom he said didn't seem to understand Continental Morse code, something the US Navy denied.

The Marconi Company was accused of secretly setting up The New York Times interview with Bride and telling him and Harold Cottam to keep quiet until they arrived in New York, but Marconi denied the accusations, stating the company wanted to award the operator after their ordeal. Bride was considered one of the heroes of the disaster, his conduct during the disaster notably earning praise from Senator William Alden Smith, the chair of the Senate inquiry.

Bride returned to England on the RMS Baltic on 18 May 1912 and took part in the British inquiry into the sinking, testifying on Day 14. In June 1913, Bride appeared as a witness in the case of Ryan v. The Oceanic Steam Navigation Company.

== Later career ==
In August 1912, London via Melbourne records show Bride being aboard the RMS Medina as a Marconi operator. During World War I, Bride initially served at a relay station in Scotland. In 1917, he joined the Royal Naval Volunteer Reserve and served as wireless operator on the HMS Mona's Isle. His World War I records show that Bride had a snake tattoo on his right arm.

Despite being a key witness in the inquiries, Bride kept a low profile after the sinking. He rarely discussed the tragic events of 14-15 April 1912 and the loss of his colleague Phillips deeply affected him. After his marriage, Bride moved with his family to Scotland where he worked as a travelling salesman for Fassett & Johnston, Ltd., a pharmaceutical company. Later in life, after retiring, Bride became the caretaker of Provan Hall, courtesy of the National Trust of Scotland.

In 1935, he spoke about his experience at the Stirling Rotary Club in Scone, Perthshire. In Janurary of 1936, Bride also responded strongly to an allegation made by Charles Lightoller in the latter's memoir Titanic and Other Ships, claiming that Phillips did not deliver the SS Mesaba ice warning which he alleged could have prevented the sinking. Writing in the Dundee Evening Telegraph, Bride defended his late colleague and condemned what he saw as an attempt to "throw doubts on the efficiency of a very gallant gentleman who died procuring aid for Commander Lightoller and 701 other fortunate survivors."

== Personal life ==
In March 1912, Bride became engaged to Mabel Ludlow, but he broke off the engagement some time after. He eventually met Lucy Downie, a Scottish nurse, whom he married in 1920. The couple had three children together: two daughters, Lucy and Jeanette, and a son, John.

Bride, a heavy smoker for most of his life, died on 29 April 1956, aged 66, from lung cancer at Stobhill Hospital in Glasgow. His body was cremated at Glasgow Crematorium and his ashes were scattered in the garden of the crematorium's chapel where he is commemorated with a plaque.

== Recognition ==
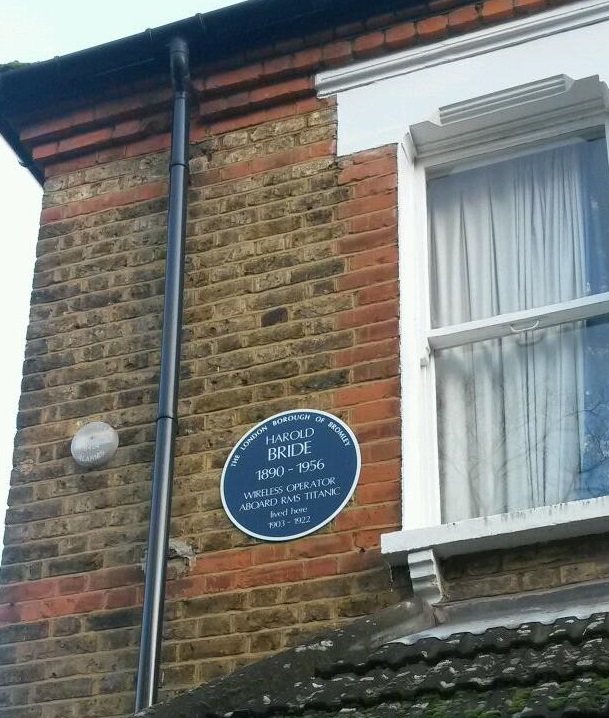
Blue plaque on Bride's home in Bromley, London

Bride is commemorated with a blue plaque in his childhood house in Bromley, 58 Ravensbourne Avenue, Shortlands.

In 2020, a similar plaque was unveiled at his home in Scone, Perthshire in Scotland where he and his family resided for ten years. It was unveiled by the Scone & District Historical Society.

== Portrayals ==
Bride has been portrayed numerous times on screen. In A Night to Remember, he is played by David McCallum and in the 1997 film Titanic, he is portrayed by Craig Kelly.

- Mime Misu -- In Nacht Und Eis (1912)
- Heinz Welzel — Titanic (1943)
- Dennis Frazer — Titanic (1953)
- David McCallum — A Night to Remember (1958)
- Peter Bourke — S.O.S. Titanic (1979)
- Barry Pepper — Titanic (1996)
- Craig Kelly — Titanic (1997)
- Martin Moran — Titanic: The Musical (1999)
- Justin Baker — Ghosts of the Abyss (2003)
- Jason Maza — The Unsinkable Titanic (2008)
- Valters Silis — Curiosity: What Sank Titanic? (2011)
- Jacob Swing — The Last Signals (2012)
- Alec Hynes — Unsinkable (2024)
- Tyger Drew-Honey — Titanic Sinks Tonight (2025)
