= SS Minnetonka =

SS Minnetonka is the name of the following ships:

- SS Minnetonka (1901), sunk by SM U-64 on 30 January 1918
- SS Minnetonka (1924), scrapped in 1934

== See also ==
- Minnetonka (disambiguation)
- USS Minnetonka
